= United States Coast Guard Air Stations =

Aviation support for U.S. Coast Guard

Coast Guard Air Stations
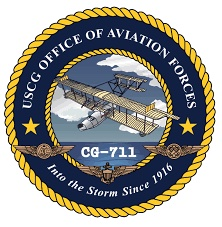
- USCG Office of Aviation Forces (CG-711)
- Active: 1920-Present
- Country: United States
- Branch: United States Coast Guard
- Type: Air Field
- Role: To provide aviation assets and resources to support the execution of Coast Guard missions.

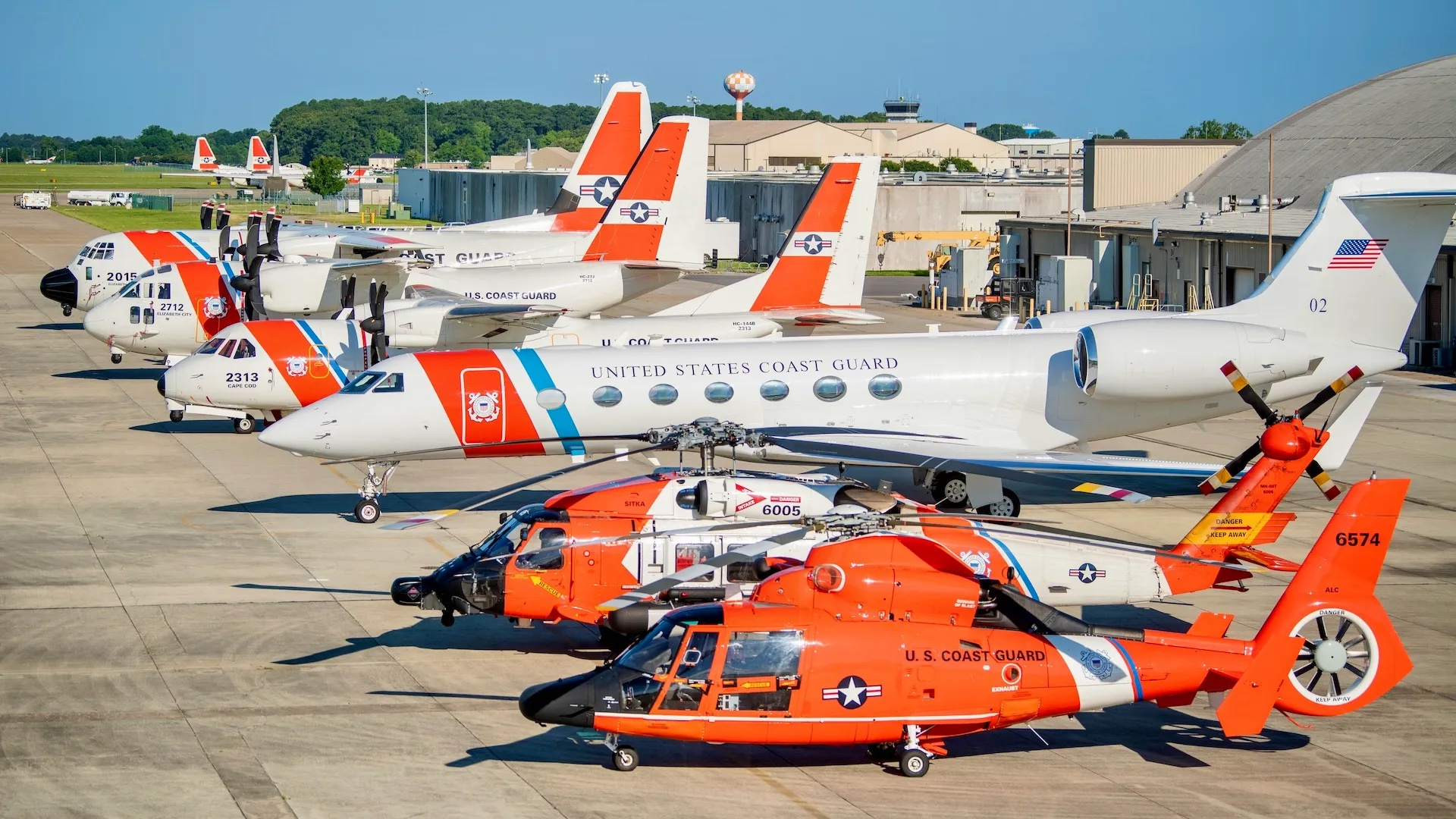
USCG Aviation fleet at Air Station Elizabeth City

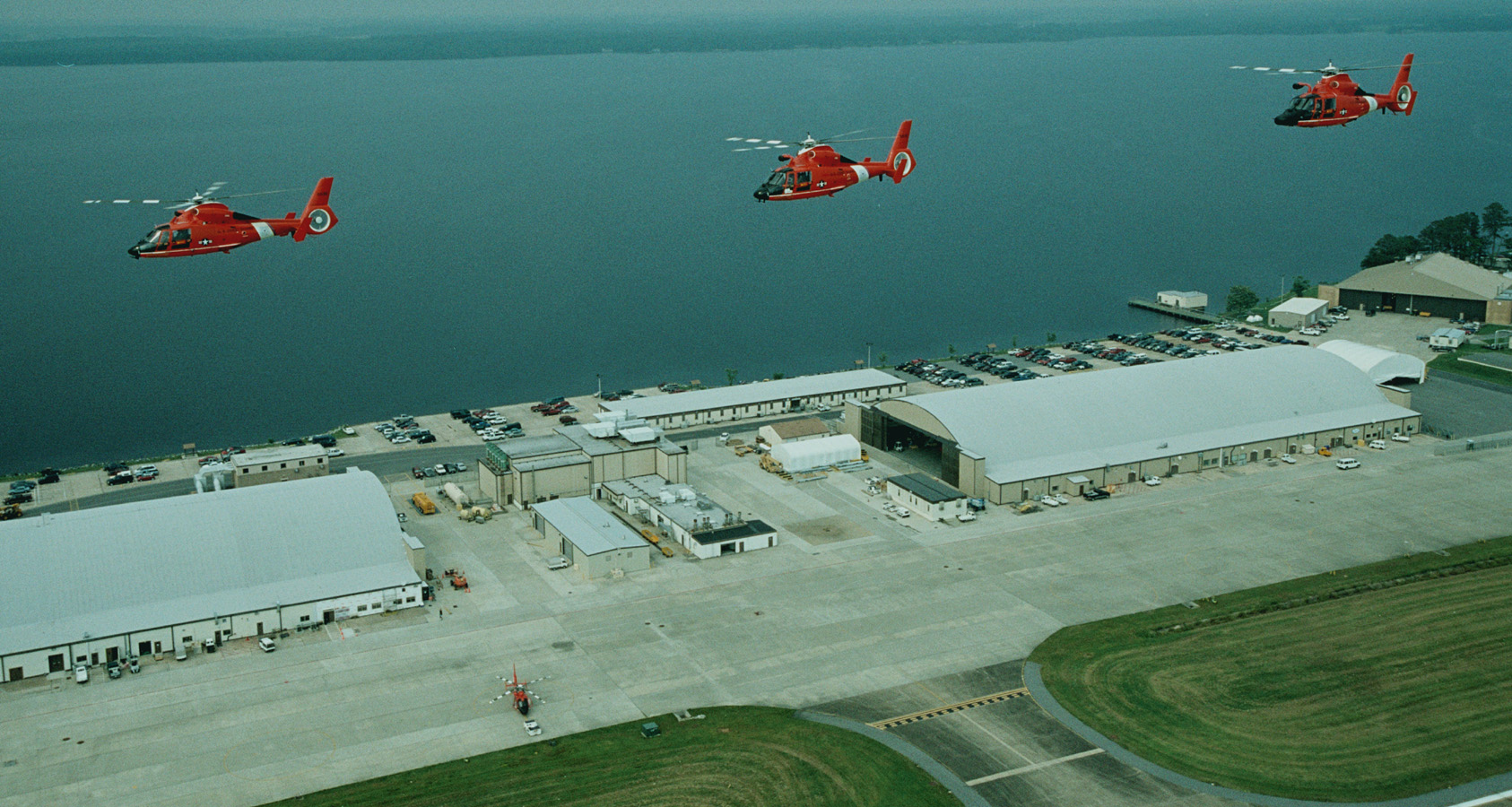
A trio of MH-65 Dolphin helicopters fly past Coast Guard Air Station Elizabeth City in North Carolina

A Coast Guard Air Station (abbreviated as CGAS or AirSta) provides aviation support for the United States Coast Guard. The Coast Guard operates approximately 210 aircraft from 24 Coast Guard Air Stations in the United States. Fixed-wing aircraft, such as the HC-130 Hercules, are built for long range missions and operate from air stations. The air stations and facilities are also home to locally based MH-65D Dolphin and Sikorsky HH-60 Jayhawk helicopters and support rotor craft assigned to flight deck equipped cutters.

Unlike Coast Guard Boat Stations, which are subordinate to Sector Commanders, the commanding officer of a Coast Guard Air Station reports directly to the appropriate District Commander. Air stations are typically commanded by an officer with the rank of captain.

Air station planning and overall aviation policies are under the oversight of the Office of Aviation Forces (CG-711), which in turn reports to the Assistant Commandant for Capability.

== Northeast District (formerly 1st) ==
| Station | Location | Opened | Closed | Notes | Ref. |
|---|---|---|---|---|---|
| Coast Guard Air Station Brooklyn | Brooklyn, New York | 1936 | 1998 | | |
| CGAS Cape Cod | Sandwich, Massachusetts | 1970 | Active | Located on the Otis Air National Guard Base. Flies the HH-60J Jayhawk helicopters, and HC-144 Ocean Sentry aircraft and provide coverage from the Canada–US border to Long Island, New York. | |
| CGAS Salem | Salem, Massachusetts | 1935 | 1970 | | |
| CGAS Ten Pound Island | Gloucester, Massachusetts | 1925 | 1935 | First permanent Coast Guard Air Station established as a seaplane base. Station Gloucester current occupies the former Ten Pound Island location. | |

== East District (formerly 5th) ==
| Station | Location | Opened | Closed | Notes | Ref. |
|---|---|---|---|---|---|
| CGAS Atlantic City | Atlantic City, New Jersey | 1998 | Active | Located at Atlantic City International Airport in Egg Harbor Township, New Jersey and provides aircrews and aircraft to the Washington, D.C. area as part of Operation Noble Eagle, a Department of Defense (NORAD) mission to protect the air space around the nation's capital. | |
| CGAS Elizabeth City | Elizabeth City, North Carolina | 1940 | Active | Enlisted Coast Guardsmen in aviation ratings receive their initial aviation training at the Aviation Technical Training Center (ATTC), which is co-located with the AirSta in Elizabeth City, NC. These two commands (AirSta and ATTC) are separate entities. | |
| Coast Guard Air Facility Norfolk | Norfolk, Virginia | 1987 | 1989 | | |
| CGAS Washington | Arlington, Virginia | 1952 | Active | As the closest Air Station to CG Headquarters, Washington provides executive transportation for the Commandant and the Secretary of Homeland Security, and is also tasked with the mission of intercepting violators to the ADIZ. Located at Ronald Reagan Washington National Airport, it is staffed by rotating crews from AirSta Atlantic City. | |
| CGAS Morehead City | Morehead City, North Carolina | 1920 | 1922 | Established in 1920 with surplus Curtiss HS and Aeromarine 40 flying boats loaned from the U.S. Navy; lost appropriation in 1922. | |

== Southeast District (formerly 7th) ==
| Station | Location | Opened | Closed | Notes | Ref. |
|---|---|---|---|---|---|
| CGAS Clearwater | Clearwater, Florida | 1934 | Active | Located at the St. Pete–Clearwater International Airport, Clearwater is the largest Air Station in the Coast Guard and home to nearly 700 USCG aviation and support personnel. | |
| CGAS Miami | Opa-locka, Florida | 1964 | Active | Located at the Miami-Opa Locka Executive Airport, formerly Naval Air Station Miami. | |
| CGAS St. Augustine | St. Augustine, Florida | 1989 | 1990 | Located at the Northeast Florida Regional Airport, formerly St. Augustine Airport. | |
| CGAS Savannah | Savannah, Georgia | 1963 | Active | Located at Hunter Army Airfield, formerly Hunter Air Force Base. | |
| CGAS Borinquen | Aguadilla, Puerto Rico | 1971 | Active | Located at the Rafael Hernandez International Airport, formerly Ramey Air Force Base. | |

== Heartland District (formerly 8th) ==
| Station | Location | Opened | Closed | Notes | Ref. |
|---|---|---|---|---|---|
| CGAS Houston | Houston, Texas | 1963 | Active | Located at the Ellington Field Joint Reserve Base | |
| CGAS Corpus Christi | Corpus Christi, Texas | 1950 | Active | Located at the Corpus Christi International Airport | |
| CGAS New Orleans | Belle Chasse, Louisiana | 1955 | Active | Located at the Naval Air Station Joint Reserve Base New Orleans | |
| Coast Guard Aviation Training Center | Mobile, Alabama | 1966 | Active | Located at the Mobile Regional Airport, all USCG pilots initially train at ATC, gain certifications for USCG airframes, and return to maintain qualifications. | |
| CGAS Biloxi | Biloxi, Mississippi | 1935 | 1966 | Located at the Biloxi Municipal Airport | |
| Air Patrol Detachment El Paso | El Paso, Texas | 1937 | 1939 | Located at Fort Sam Houston | |

== Great Lakes District (formerly 9th) ==
| Station | Location | Opened | Closed | Notes | Ref. |
|---|---|---|---|---|---|
| CGAS Chicago | Glenview, Illinois | 1969 | 1995 | Located on Naval Air Station Glenview (now closed) | |
| CGAS Detroit | Mt. Clemens, Michigan | 1966 | Active | Located at the Selfridge Air National Guard Base | |
| CGAS Traverse City | Traverse City, Michigan | 1946 | Active | Located at the Cherry Capital Airport | |
| Air Facility Muskegon | Muskegon, Michigan | N/A | Active | Detachment of Air Station Detroit | |
| Air Facility Waukegan | Waukegan, Illinois | N/A | Active | Detachment of Air Station Traverse City | |

== Southwest District (formerly 11th) ==
| Station | Location | Opened | Closed | Notes | Ref. |
|---|---|---|---|---|---|
| CGAS Humboldt Bay | Humboldt Bay, California | 1977 | Active | Located at Arcata-Eureka Airport. | |
| CGAS Sacramento | North Highlands, CA | 1978 | Active | Located at Sacramento McClellan Airport, formerly McClellan Air Force Base | |
| CGAS San Francisco | San Francisco, California | 1941 | Active | Colocated at San Francisco International Airport | |
| CGAS Ventura | Ventura County, CA | 2024 | Active | Located at Naval Air Station Point Mugu, Ventura commenced operations in 2024 as the first new Air Station in 25 years, with Commander Amanda Sardone as its first CO. The 4 bay hangar facility supports an all MH-60T helicopter squadron, covering an AOR stretching 350 nautical miles and from Dana Point to Morro Bay. | |
| CGAS Los Angeles | Los Angeles, CA | 1962 | 2016 | This air station closed in September 2016 when it lost its lease on its facility at Los Angeles International Airport to an expansion project. Administratively, its component units were relocated to Naval Air Station Point Mugu in Point Mugu, California, and merged with/became a FOB of AIRSTA San Francisco until the completion of Air Station Ventura. | |
| CGAS San Diego | San Diego, California | 1937 | Active | Located adjacent to San Diego International Airport, this air station previously operated both rotary-wing and fixed-wing aircraft, with access for the latter to the airport's 9,400 foot runway. Although fixed-wing aircraft are no longer based at this air station, access to the runway remains. | |

== Northwest District (formerly 13th) ==
| Station | Location | Opened | Closed | Notes | Ref. |
|---|---|---|---|---|---|
| CGAS Astoria | Warrenton, Oregon | 1964 | Active | Established at Tongue Point in 1964 and moved to current location in 1966. | |
| CGAS North Bend | North Bend, Oregon | 1974 | Active | | |
| CGAS Port Angeles | Port Angeles, Washington | 1935 | Active | Supports three MH-65D Dolphin helicopters, which have been operating at the station since 1984. | |

== Oceania District (formerly 14th) ==
| Station | Location | Opened | Closed | Notes | Ref. |
|---|---|---|---|---|---|
| CGAS Barbers Point | Kapolei, Hawaii | 1949 | Active | Operations transferred from Kaneohe in 1949. Located at Kalaeloa Airport, formerly Naval Air Station Barbers Point. | |
| Air Detachment Sangley Point | Cavite City, Cavite | 1946 | 1971 | Colocated with Naval Station Sangley Point. Provided aerial support for LORAN stations in the Philippine islands. | |
| SAR Wake | | | | | |
| SAR Midway | | | | | |
| Air Detachment Kaneohe | Hawaii | 1945 | 1949 | | |
| Air Detachment Guam | Agana, Guam | 1947 | 1972 | Established at Naval Air Station Agana to provide LORAN support for western Pacific stations. | |

== Arctic District (formerly 17th) ==
| Station | Location | Opened | Closed | Notes | Reference |
|---|---|---|---|---|---|
| CGAS Kodiak | Kodiak, Alaska | 1947 | Active | Largest Air Station in USCG PACAREA. Located at the Kodiak Airport, formerly Naval Air Station Kodiak. | |
| CGAS Sitka | Sitka, Alaska | 1977 | Active | Area encompasses Southeast Alaska to Alaskan-Canadian border and the central Gulf of Alaska | |
| Air Support Facility Cordova | Cordova, Alaska | 1980 | Seasonal | ASF Cordova serves as a seasonal forward operating base reporting to Air Station Kodiak to better support increased maritime activity during the summer fishing season. Other locations utilized by CGAS Kodiak have included Kotzebue and Cold Bay, AK. | |
| Air Support Facility Kotzebue | Kotzebue, Alaska | 2016 | Seasonal | Located 33 miles above the Arctic Circle and 700 miles from Kodiak, CGAS Kodiak maintains a seasonal forward location along with other USCG assets in Kotzebue as greater traffic transits through the Northwest Passage during the summer season. | |

== Others ==
- Air Detachment Naples (Naples, Campania, Italy) (disestablished 1972)
- Air Detachment Argentia (Argentia, Newfoundland, Canada) (disestablished 1966)

== Images ==
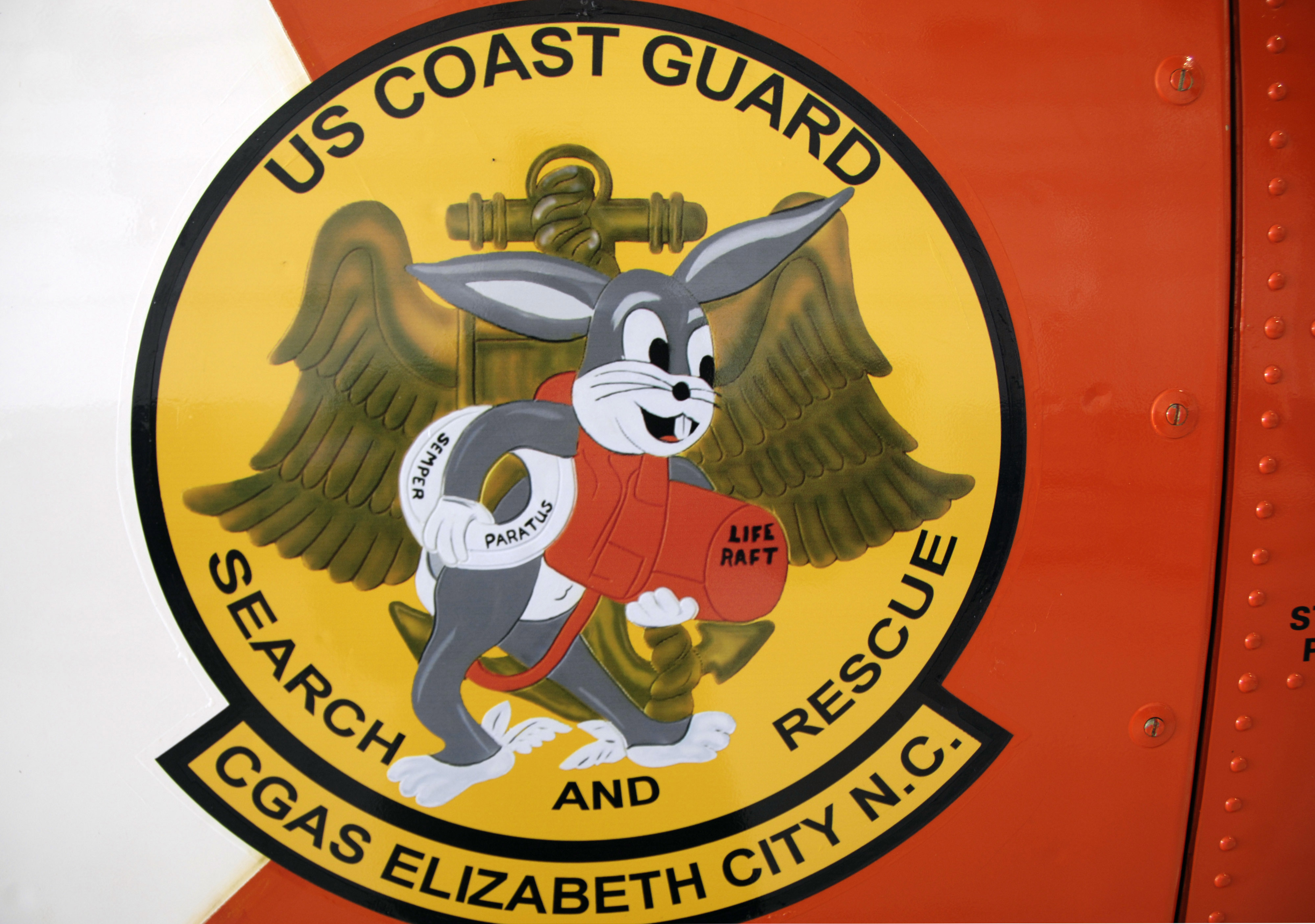
CGAS Elizabeth City,
East District,
Elizabeth City, NC

CGAS Atlantic City,
East District,
Atlantic City, NJ

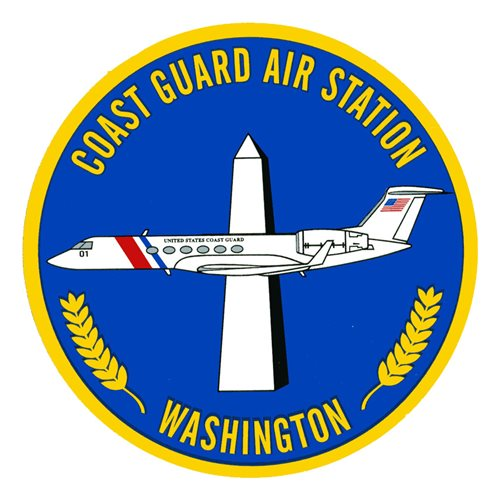
CGAS Washington,
East District,
Washington, D.C.

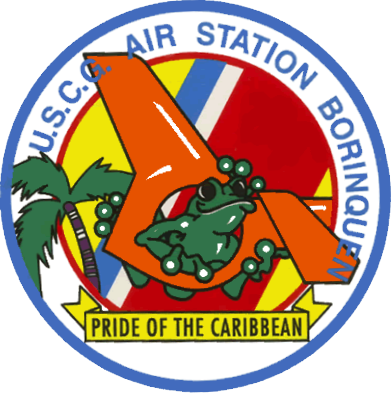
CGAS Borinquen,
Southeast District,
Aguadilla, Puerto Rico

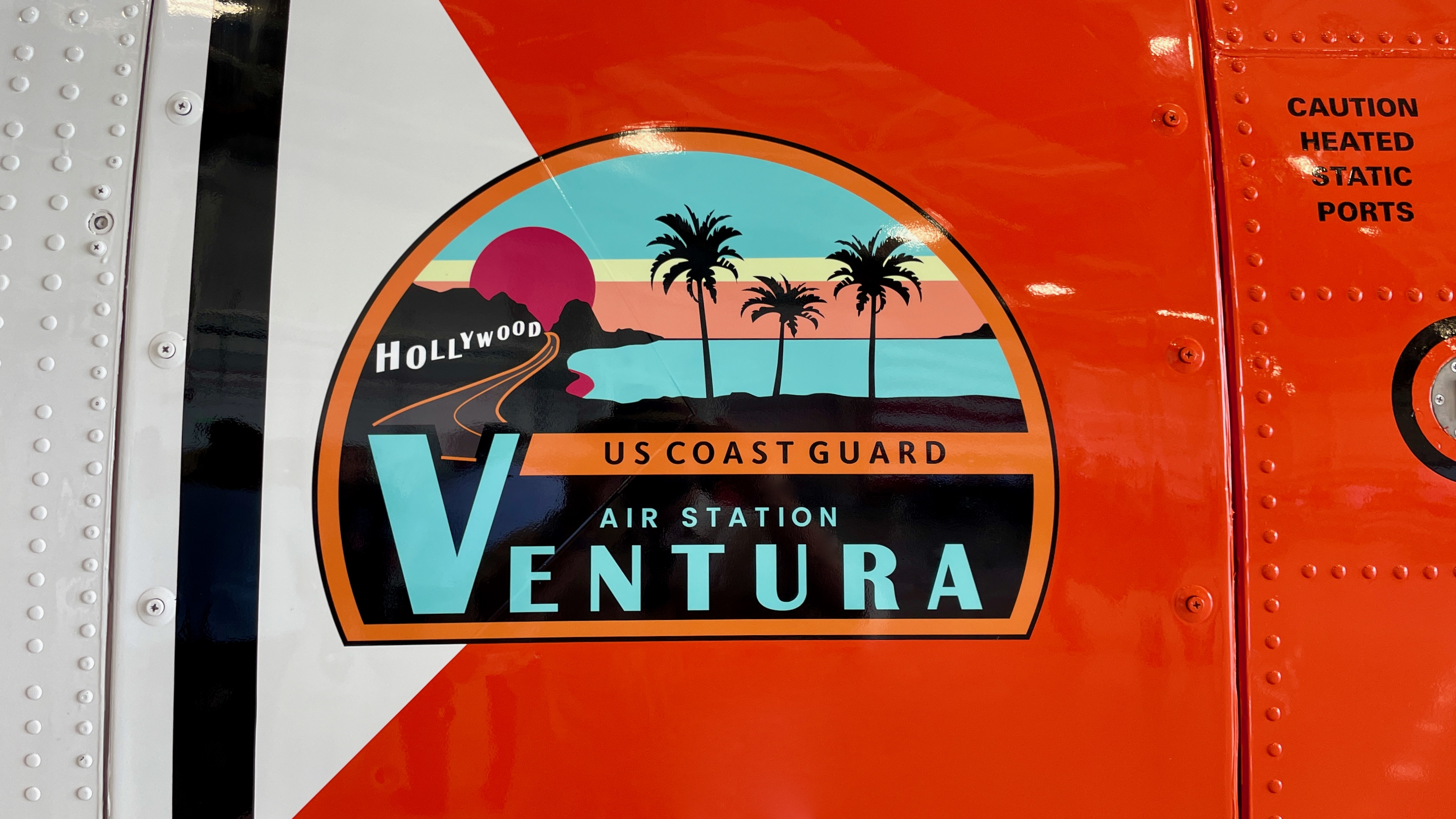
CGAS Ventura,
Southwest District,
Ventura, CA

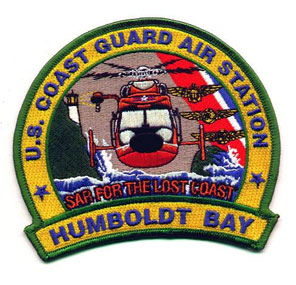
CGAS Humboldt Bay,
Southwest District,
Humboldt Bay, CA

CGAS Astoria,
Northwest District,
Warrenton, OR

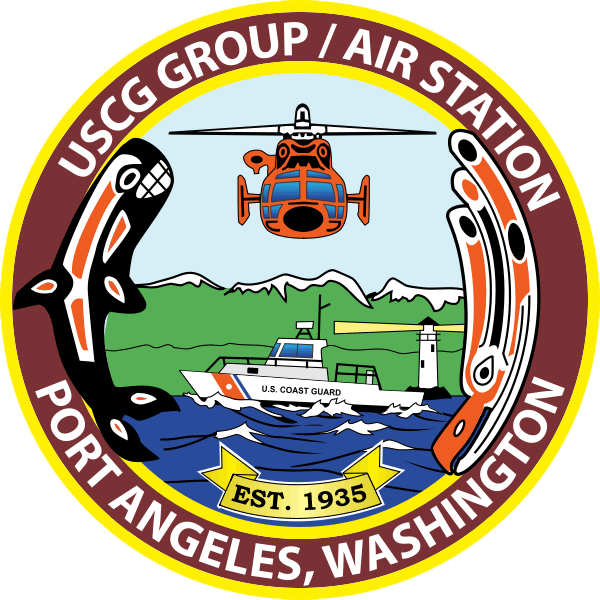
CGAS Port Angeles,
Northwest District,
Port Angeles, WA

CGAS Barbers Point,
Oceania District,
Honolulu, HI

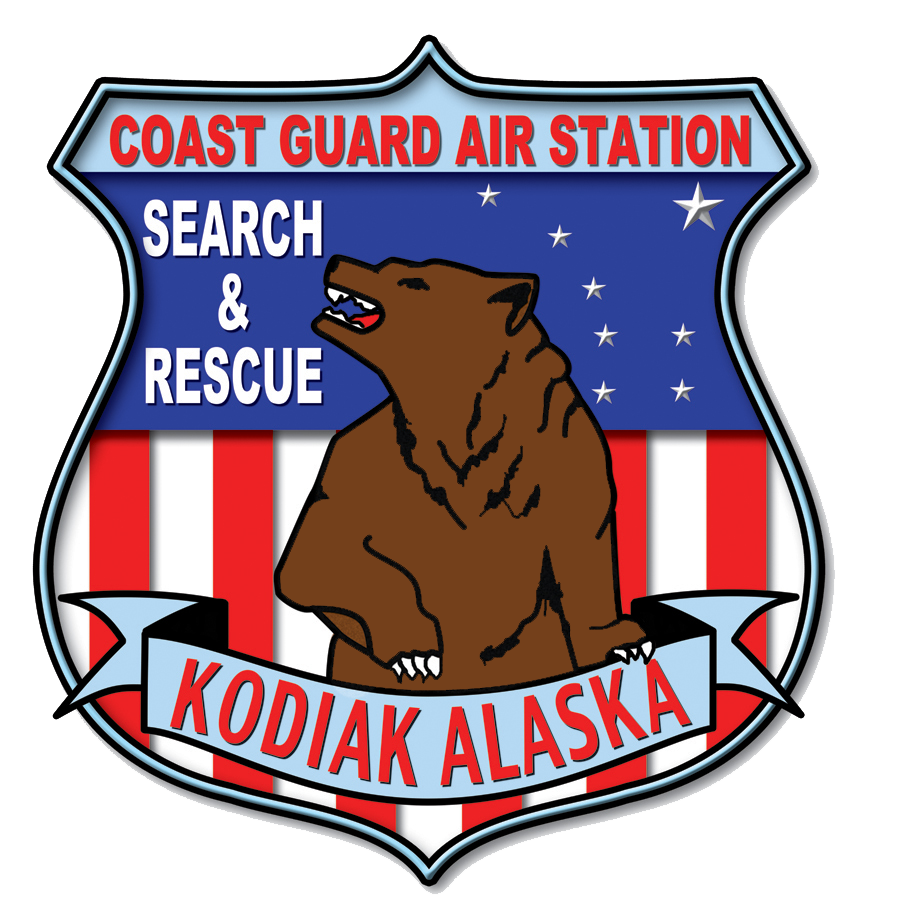
CGAS Kodiak,
Arctic District,
Kodiak, AK

== See also ==
- List of United States military bases
- United States Coast Guard History and Heritage Sites
