= Coast Guard Air Station Los Angeles =

Former U.S. Coast Guard base in Los Angeles, California

Coordinates: 34°07′13″N 119°07′16″W

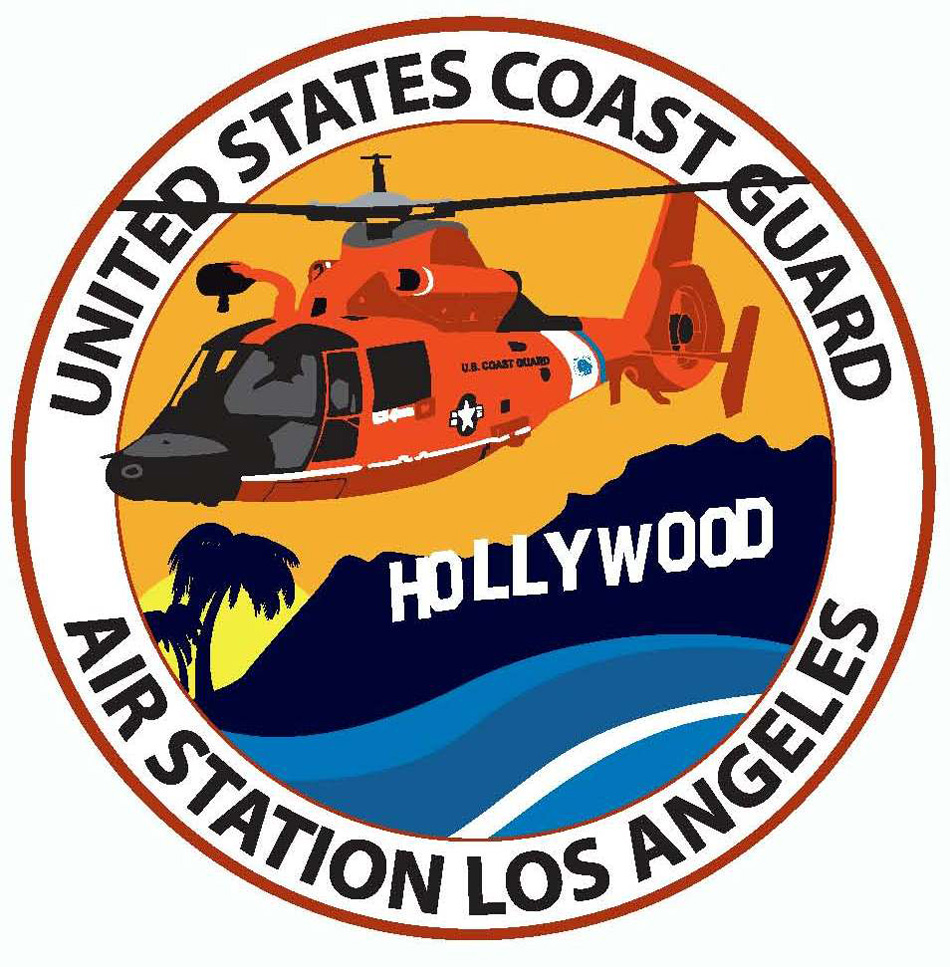
- Unit patch
- Active: 1962–2016
- Country: United States
- Branch: United States Coast Guard
- Type: Air station
- Role: Patrol the Southern California Coast from Dana Point to Morro Bay.
- Garrison/HQ: Naval Air Station Point Mugu

Aircraft flown
- Helicopter: 3 HH-65 Dolphin

Coast Guard Air Station Los Angeles (CGAS Los Angeles) was a United States Coast Guard Air Station located at Los Angeles International Airport (LAX) in Los Angeles, California. CGAS Los Angeles was activated in 1962, and was deactivated in 2016.

== Missions ==
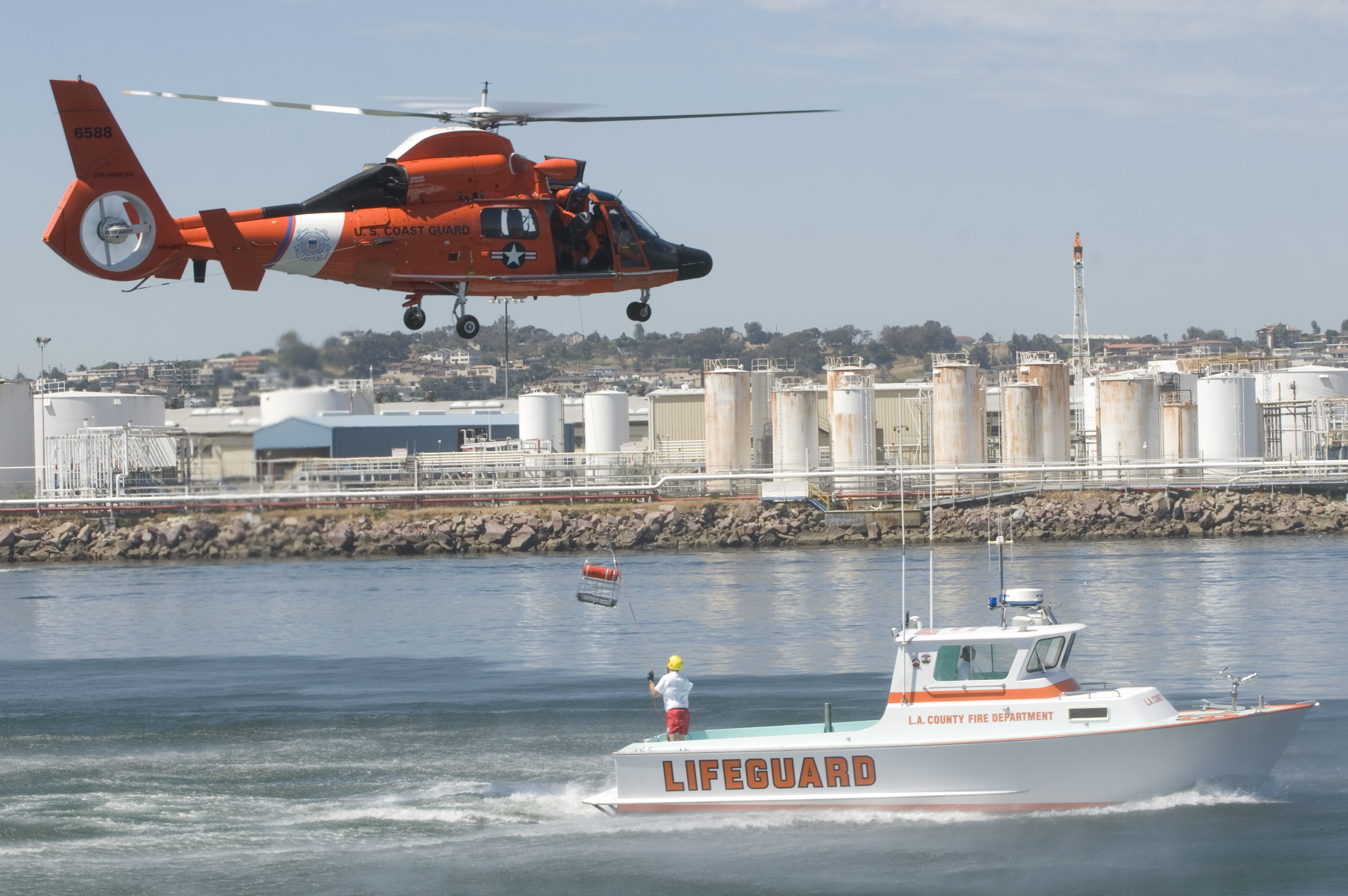
Crews from CGAS Los Angeles and Baywatch Cabrillo demonstrating search and rescue techniques in San Pedro, 2009

CGAS Los Angeles missions included search and rescue, homeland security, and environmental protection.

Helicopters from the base patrolled the west coast of the United States from Morro Bay to Dana Point. The California Channel Islands, the Port of Los Angeles, and the Port of Long Beach fell within the station's operating area.

== History ==
CGAS Los Angeles was founded in August 1962 through the combined efforts of the Los Angeles Chamber of Commerce, U.S. Senator Thomas Kuchel, and U.S. Representative James Roosevelt.

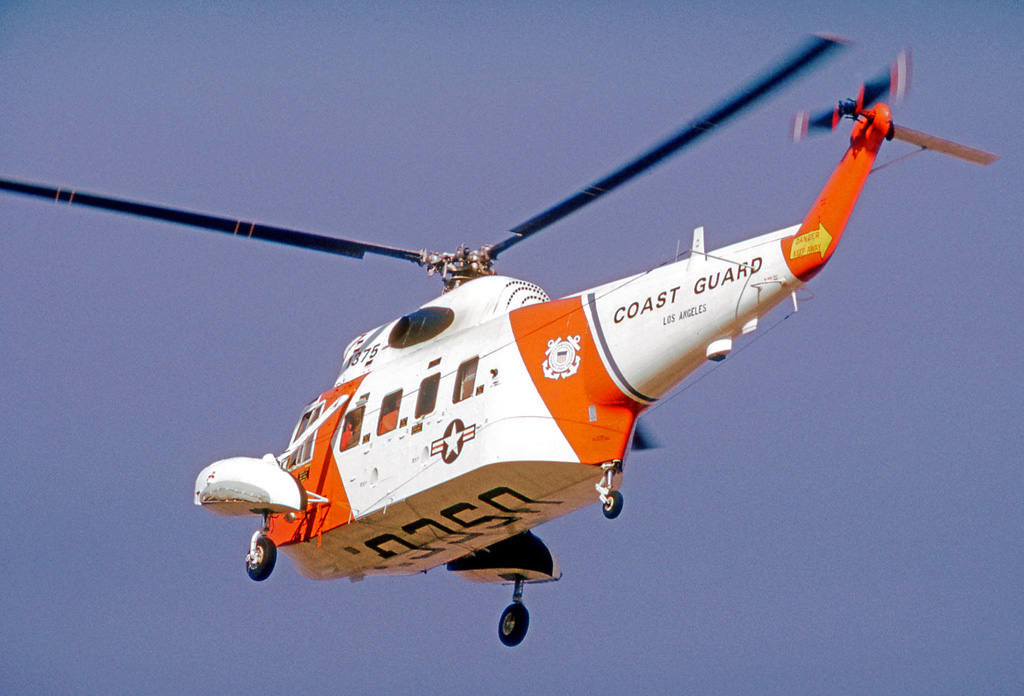
Sikorsky HH-52A Seaguard of USCG Los Angeles over LAX in 1973

The unit began as an aviation detachment in August 1962, with one HO-4S helicopter from CGAS San Diego. ASLA was commissioned in November 1962 with two HO-4S helicopters, nine officers, and twenty enlisted personnel. In May 1963, the unit switched to three HH-52A Seaguard helicopters. These helicopters were flown for 24 years, until in 1987 the Air Station transitioned to HH-65A Dolphin helicopters.

In 2004, Los Angeles World Airports informed USCG that the 25-year lease which would expire in 2011 would not be renewed for another 25 years. Instead, LAWA would only grant a 5-year extension to 2016. In September 2016, CGAS Los Angeles was closed when the lease on the existing facility at Los Angeles International Airport ended. This allowed LAX to accommodate the planned improvements for LAX's midfield, including the Midfield Satellite Concourse North (MSC North; now known as the West Gates at Tom Bradley International Terminal).

CGAS Los Angeles's component units were relocated to a Coast Guard Forward Operating Base located at NVBC Point Mugu. Administratively, it merged with/became a satellite FOB of the Coast Guard Air Station San Francisco, until the commissioning of Coast Guard Air Station Ventura in 2024.

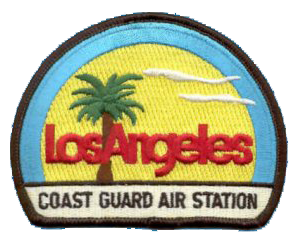
Older CGAS Los Angeles patch
