= Coast Guard Air Station Clearwater =

US Coast Guard base in Clearwater, Florida

- Unit Patch
- Active: 1934–present
- Country: United States
- Branch: United States Coast Guard
- Mottos: Anytime, Anywhere
- Engagements: World War II; Cuban Missile Crisis; Cold War; Operation Urgent Fury; Operation Desert Storm; September 11, 2001 attacks

Commanders
- Current commander: Captain Scott Phy

Aircraft flown
- Helicopter: MH-60T Jayhawk
- Patrol: HC-27J Spartan

United States Coast Guard Air Station Clearwater (CGAS Clearwater) is the United States Coast Guard's largest air station. It is located at the St. Petersburg-Clearwater International Airport in Clearwater, Florida and is home to nearly 700 USCG aviation and support personnel. As of March 2021, there are ten MH-60T Jayhawk helicopters and four HC-130H Hercules aircraft assigned to CGAS Clearwater. Also on static display is USCG 1023, a restored Grumman HU-16 Albatross.

Air Station Clearwater also operates two aviation facilities in The Bahamas, one at Great Inagua and the other at the United States Navy's Atlantic Undersea Test and Evaluation Center (AUTEC) installation at Andros Island. These facilities support continually deployed MH-60Ts from various Coast Guard air stations for Operations Bahamas, Turks and Caicos (OPBAT), a joint U.S. Drug Enforcement Administration (DEA), U.S. Immigration and Customs Enforcement (ICE) and U.S. Coast Guard counter-narcotics (CN) and migrant smuggling interdiction operation.

== History ==
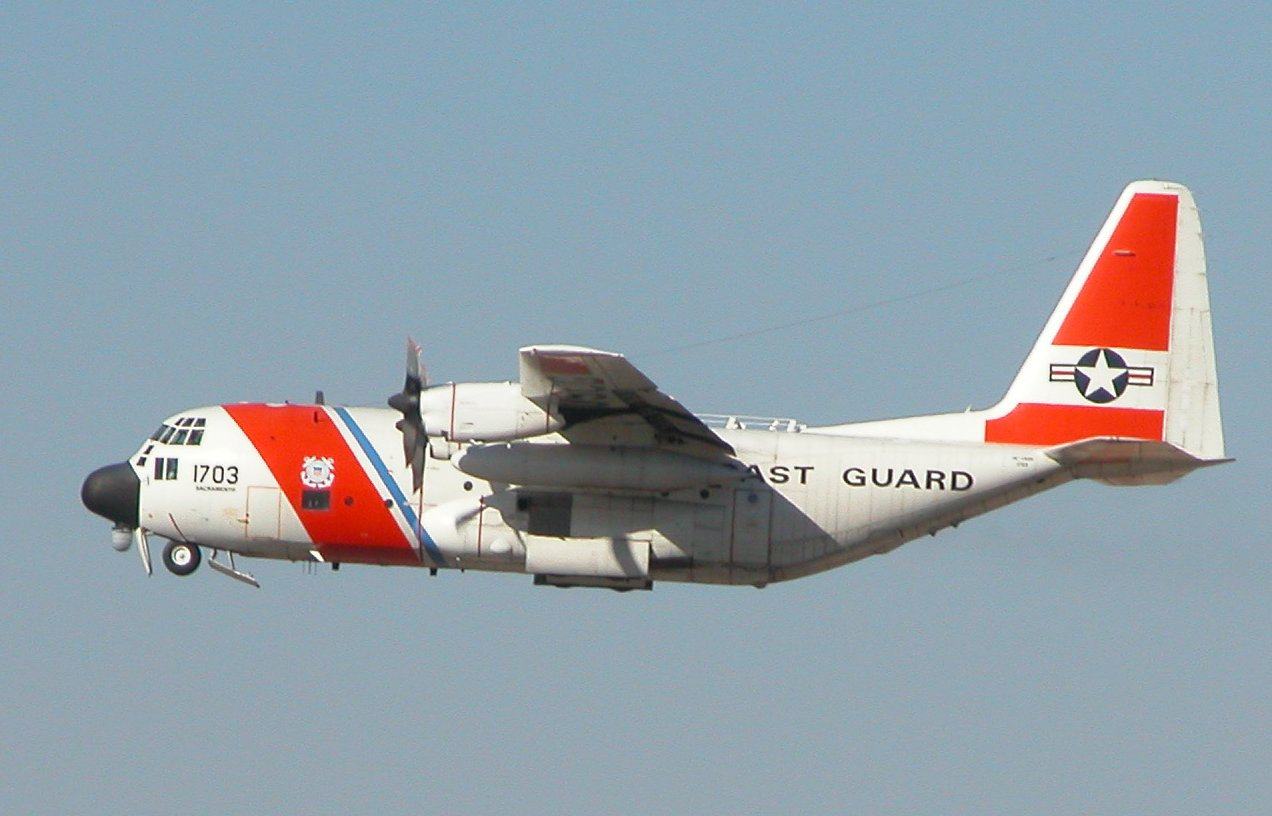
USCG HC-130H Hercules aircraft

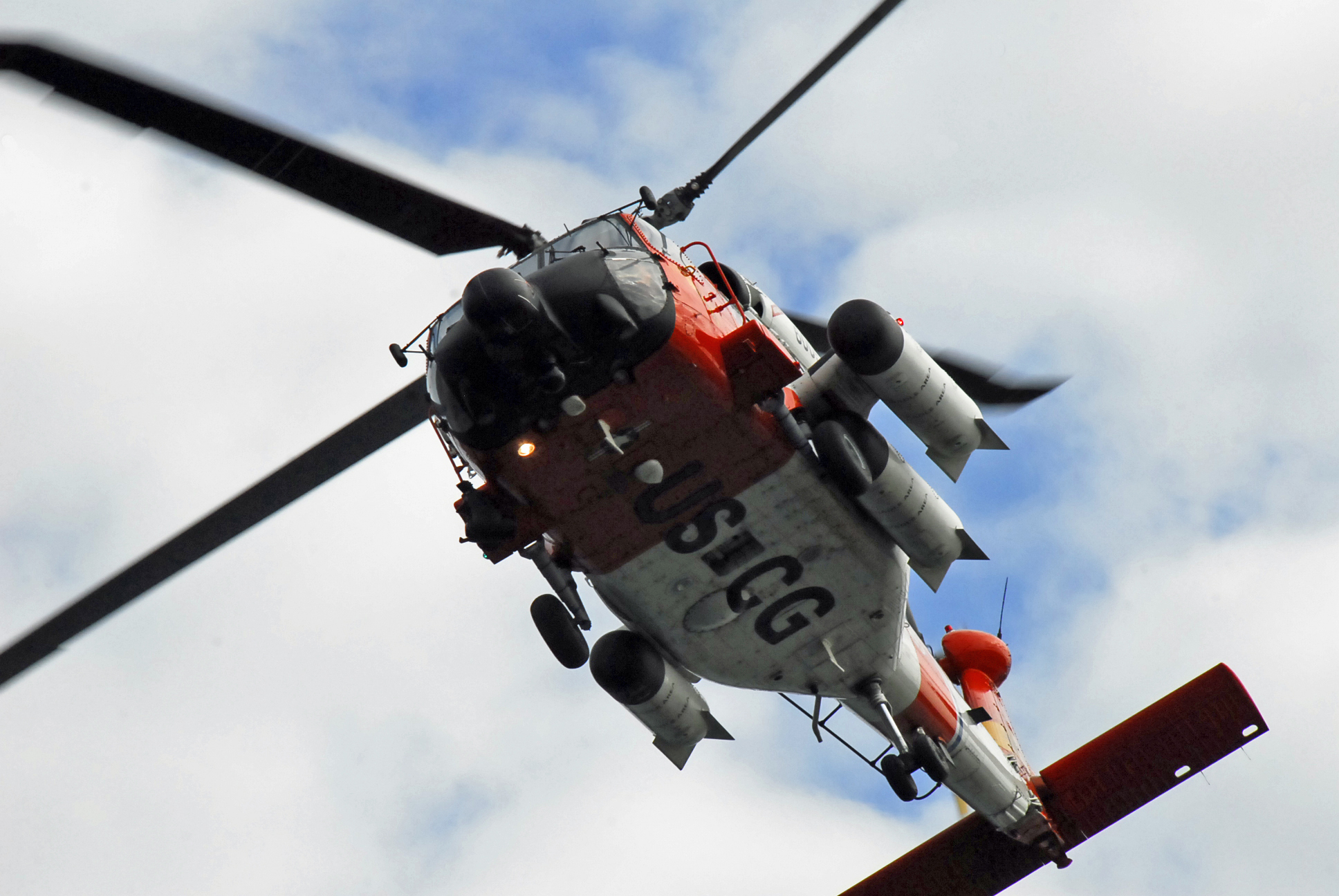
USCG MH-60T Jayhawk aircraft

In 1934, a Coast Guard air station was commissioned on the west coast of Florida at Albert Whitted Airport in downtown St. Petersburg. Designated as Coast Guard Air Station St. Petersburg, it subsequently became a home base for various Coast Guard amphibious aircraft and helicopters. In 1976, the addition of four land-based HC-130 Hercules aircraft, replacing the air station's HU-16E Albatross amphibious aircraft and augmenting the air station's HH-3F Pelican helicopters, combined with the limited airfield facilities and safety margins at Albert Whitted Airport for large fixed-wing aircraft, prompted the construction of and relocation to new facilities at St. Petersburg-Clearwater International Airport. With this move, AIRSTA St. Petersburg was downgraded to a non-flying installation renamed Coast Guard Station St. Petersburg (STA St. Petersburg) and the relocated air station's name was changed to U.S. Coast Guard Air Station Clearwater.

CGAS Clearwater has a rich history and its operations have been at the heart of significant events in Florida and the Caribbean for many years. In the early 1980s, its high operations tempo earned AIRSTA Clearwater two Coast Guard Meritorious Unit Commendations, the Humanitarian Service Medal, and the Coast Guard Unit Commendation. It was also during this time that the air station provided crucial support to the USCG surface fleet during the Cuban refugee boat lift. Shortly thereafter, AIRSTA Clearwater answered the call to duty with other U.S. military forces during Operation Urgent Fury, the Grenada rescue mission, and was awarded the Armed Forces Expeditionary Medal for its support of the invasion as well as the Coast Guard Meritorious Unit Commendation for its continual support efforts. Later that same year another Coast Guard Meritorious Unit Commendation was awarded to AIRSTA Clearwater for its role in Operation Wagon Wheel, an international drug interdiction effort.

In 1986, following on the success of the previous operation, AIRSTA Clearwater conducted Operation Hunter. This drug interdiction effort planted the seeds for what is today's OPBAT (Operation Bahamas and Turks and Caicos). Perhaps the single most noteworthy mission for the air station also came in 1986, during the launch of the Space Shuttle Challenger. AIRSTA Clearwater crews responded immediately, the initial crew arriving on scene so quickly that it had to stand off while the debris from the explosion continued to fall from the sky. In all, AIRSTA Clearwater flew 33 sorties on the Challenger mission and was awarded a Coast Guard Unit Commendation with Operational device.

CGAS Clearwater became the Coast Guard's largest air station in 1987 with the expansion of the drug interdiction mission, Operation Bahamas, Turks, and Caicos (OPBAT). This large ongoing mission resulted in the eventual assignment of twelve HH-60J Jayhawk helicopters, then the newest in the Coast Guard fleet, and boosted personnel strength to over 500 men and women. Also during this period, three additional HC-130s were stationed at AIRSTA Clearwater to support the increased law enforcement efforts. The air station's motto of "Anytime, Anywhere" accurately describes its pace of operations.

The 1990s were no less dramatic for the men and women of CGAS Clearwater. In 1991, the station's HC-130s responded rapidly to fly personnel and supplies in and out of the Southwest Asia combat theater in support of Operation Desert Storm. During the Haitian uprising in 1992, CGAS Clearwater crews evacuated American embassy personnel and transported U.S. Special Forces into Haiti. When south Florida and Louisiana were devastated by Hurricane Andrew the same year, CGAS Clearwater crews flew missions round the clock, transporting hundreds of tons of badly needed supplies. In March 1993, the "Storm of the Century" struck Florida leaving numerous sunken vessels in its wake. Air Station Clearwater crews launched at the height of the storm and pulled 62 people from the water in what was the busiest search and rescue day in the air station's history. In the summer of 1994, air crews participated in a massive SAR effort which located and rescued 34,568 Cubans and 23,389 Haitian migrants from the waters of the Caribbean.

In 1997, the U.S. renewed its effort towards the war on drugs, and AIRSTA Clearwater responded as part of Operations Frontier Shield, Gulf Shield, and Frontier Lance. These operations were aimed at stemming the flow of illegal drugs and migrants and spanned from the Leeward Islands of the Caribbean to the southern coastline of Texas. The Coast Guard set new records for both drug seizures and arrests. Other accolades for AIRSTA Clearwater included:

- Winner of the National Defense Transportation Award for 2000.
- Winner of Excellence in Food Services Award for 2001, 2002, 2004 and 2007.

In 2005, Air Station Clearwater crews deployed overseas to aid and support the survivors of the 2004 tsunami in the Indian Ocean.

In 2006, the United States Navy Reserve vacated the former Navy Operational Support Center St. Petersburg/Clearwater (formerly Naval Reserve Center St. Petersburg/Clearwater) adjacent to the air station, consolidating with Navy Operational Support Center Tampa at a recently completed purpose-built facility at MacDill Air Force Base. The Navy transferred its former Clearwater facility to the Coast Guard which then placed it under the oversight of Coast Guard Air Station Clearwater. The complex now supports Port Security Unit 307, a Coast Guard Reserve unit, as well as providing additional facilities for AIRSTA Clearwater requirements.

In 2012 and 2013, AIRSTA Clearwater figured prominently in The Weather Channel television documentary series, Coast G. AIRSTA Clearwater then commenced transition of their HH-60J fleet to the MH-60T Jayhawk in 2014 a

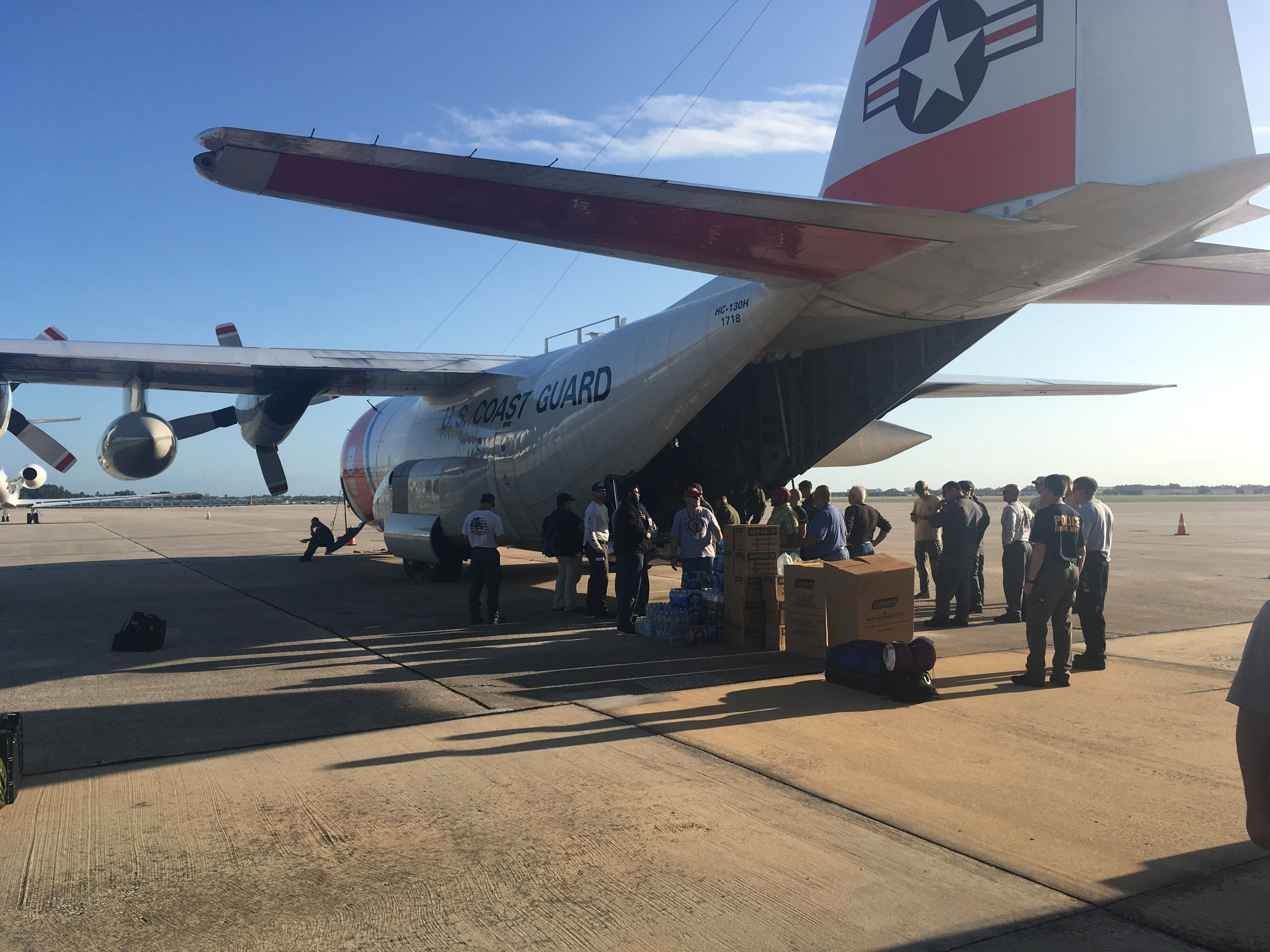
Hurricane Irma disaster relief personnel and 6,000 pounds resupplies are loaded onto an Air Station Clearwater HC-130H Hercules aircraft, September 12, 2017

== Current aircraft ==
The nine Sikorsky HH-60J Jayhawk helicopters previously assigned to AIRSTA Clearwater that had replaced the previous HH-3F Pelican aircraft in the late 1980s were replaced in 2014 by thirteen upgraded MH-60T Jayhawk versions. Three of these MH-60T aircraft were later transferred to Coast Guard Air Station Borinquen, Puerto Rico when that air station transitioned from the MH-65E Dolphin to the MH-60T, resulting in AIRSTA Clearwater's current complement of ten MH-60Ts. This aircraft has a long-range capability of 600 nautical miles (1100 km) to support Coast Guard cutters on Law Enforcement patrols, deliver dewatering pumps to sinking vessels, evacuate injured crew members from vessels far at sea, and many other missions. Air Station Clearwater helicopter aircrews fly an average of over 400 Search and Rescue cases each year along both the east and west coasts of Florida, the Bahamas, and beyond.

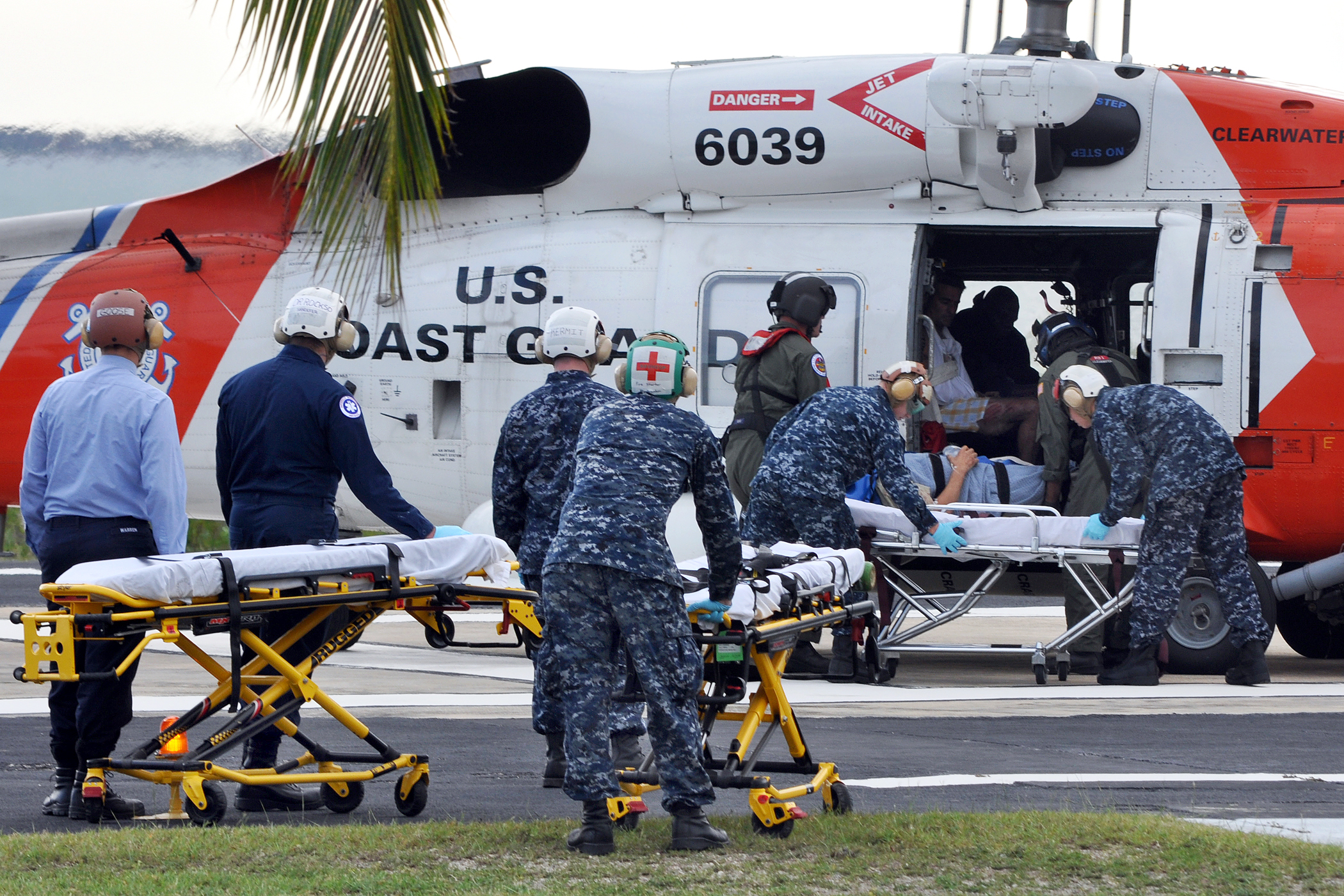
2010 Haitian earthquake victims are unloaded from an AIRSTA Clearwater HH-60J at U.S. Naval Hospital Guantanamo Bay.

== Installation facilities ==
AIRSTA Clearwater is a tenant military activity / long-term leased facility comprising several acres in the northwest quadrant of St. Petersburg-Clearwater International Airport. A separate Army Aviation Support Facility (AASF) of the U.S. Army Reserve was formerly located approximately a 1/2 mile north of the air station; its units relocated to a new aviation support facility at MacDill Air Force Base in 2022. The military cantonment area for the Coast Guard consists of two large aircraft maintenance hangars, associated aircraft parking areas, a headquarters complex, and approximately a dozen other support buildings to include quarters for flight crews on 24-hour alert, a dining facility/galley, a medical clinic, swimming pool, and an All Hands club for station personnel. A Coast Guard Exchange complex consisting of a retail store, uniform shop, barber shop, and beauty salon for use by all active and retired U.S. military personnel and eligible family members is also located on the installation.
