= Coast Guard Air Station San Francisco =

Coast Guard airport in San Francisco, California, United States

Coordinates: 37.631556°N 122.390430°W

- Air Station San Francisco patch
- Active: 1941–present
- Country: United States
- Branch: United States Coast Guard
- Type: Air Station
- Role: Provide Search and Rescue coverage from Point Conception to Fort Bragg

Aircraft flown
- Helicopter: Eurocopter MH-65 Dolphin

Coast Guard Air Station San Francisco is a United States Coast Guard Air Station located 13 miles (21 km) south of downtown San Francisco, California, at the San Francisco International Airport in an unincorporated area of San Mateo County. The air station sits adjacent to the airport with a limited use helicopter pad.

== Operations and missions ==
Coast Guard Air Station San Francisco (CGAS) located at the San Francisco International Airport is one of five air stations in the Southwest Coast Guard District. Currently, Air Station San Francisco operates four MH65 Dolphin helicopters that provides its primary mission search and rescue. CGAS San Francisco also provides support for a wide range of other Coast Guard operations such as Maritime Law enforcement, port security, Aids to Navigation support and Marine Environmental Protection to approximately 300 miles (480 km) of coastline from Point Conception to Fort Bragg.

== History ==
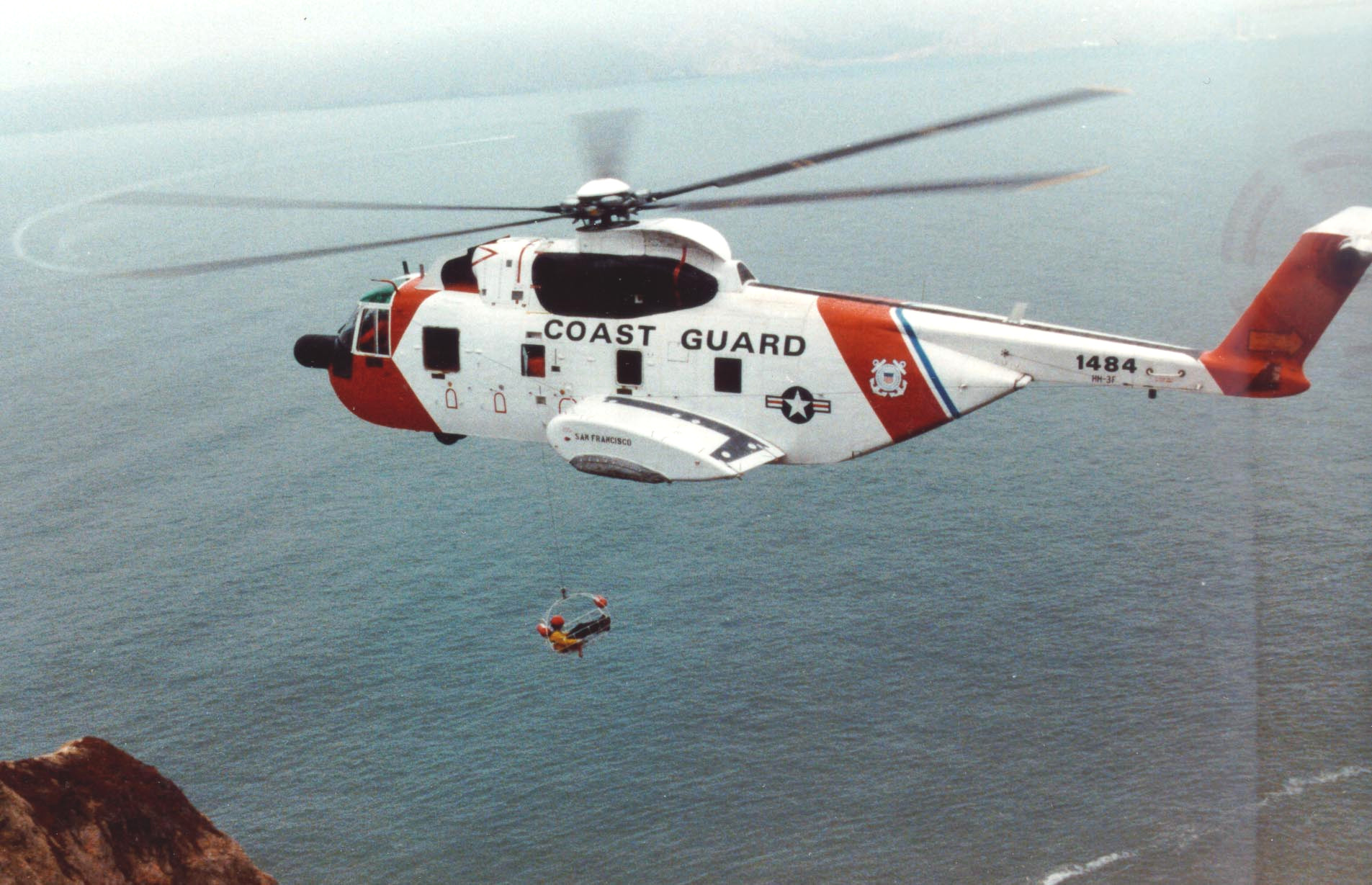
A HH-3F Pelican from the station

Coast Guard Air Station San Francisco was completed on February 15, 1941, making it one of the longest tenured tenants at SFO. The air station operated a PBY-5 Catalina and two RD-4 Dolphins. On November 1, 1941, the aircraft and personnel were placed under Navy command where they continued to conduct Search and Rescue and Coastal Patrols through the end of World War II. Coast Guard Air Station San Francisco was also tasked with aiding in the construction of the highly classified and secret Long Range Navigation (LORAN) stations in the North Pacific in 1943. Proving an invaluable asset in this important mission, the San Francisco-based PBY-5 Catalina was instrumental in the completion of the Aleutian LORAN chain by transporting personnel, supplies and building materials. World War II the base was called Naval Auxiliary Air Facility Mills Field and Coast Guard Air Station, San Francisco.

After World War II, the Air Station resumed normal operations under Coast Guard control after release from the Navy on June 30, 1946. The first helicopter stationed here in San Francisco was the HO3S-1 Dragonfly in 1947. In the early fifties the Grumman HU-16 Albatross replaced the air stations aging World War II fixed wing inventory. This general purpose amphibian, affectionately known as the "Goat", proved to be a highly adaptable platform for SAR and LE. Eventually, the Air Station received the HH-52A Sea Guard helicopter in 1963 which was a significant improvement over its predecessor with its improved flight characteristics and capabilities.

Also stationed at San Francisco were the C-130s which when they were moved to the newly constructed Coast Guard Air Station Sacramento in 1978, ended 37 years of Coast Guard fixed wing aviation in San Francisco. In 1991, Air Station San Francisco received its first HH-60 J-Hawk to replace the HH-3F Pelican as the medium range Search and Rescue Helicopter. Restructuring in Coast Guard Aviation lead to a short stay of the HH-60 in San Francisco and in June 1996, four HH-65s were moved to San Francisco from San Diego. In the fall of 2001, the Air Station transitioned to the HH-65B, an upgrade in the avionics package. In the spring of 2006, the HH-65B was upgraded to the HH-65C after the installation of Turbomeca Arriel 2C2-CG engines.

While the airframes have evolved, the primary mission of Air Station San Francisco has remained unchanged for six decades, maritime Search and Rescue along 300 miles (480 km) of coastline from Point Conception to Fort Bragg. In addition to SAR, Air Station San Francisco has expanded its missions to include Homeland Security, Maritime Law Enforcement, Environmental Protection, Aids to Navigation, Logistics, and Cliff Rescue.

=== Point Mugu ===
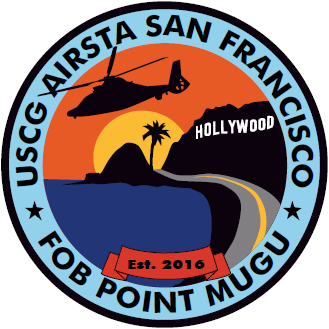

From 2016 to 2024, the component units of CGAS Los Angeles were administratively reassigned to CGAS San Francisco following the expiration of CGAS Los Angeles's lease on facilities at the Los Angeles International Airport and the permanent closure of the air station. These component units were relocated to Naval Air Station Point Mugu in Point Mugu, California until the new CGAS Ventura was commissioned in November 2024. NAS Pt Mugu has been part of Naval Base Ventura County since 2000.

== See also ==
- Coast Guard Air Station Humboldt Bay
- California during World War II
- California World War II Army Airfields
- List of airports in California
- Transportation in the San Francisco Bay Area
