= Coast Guard Air Station Humboldt Bay =

US Coast Guard base near Eureka, California

Coordinates: 40°58′36″N 124°06′40″W

Coast Guard Sector/Air Station Humboldt Bay
- Unit Patch CGAS Humboldt Bay
- Active: 1977–present
- Country: United States
- Branch: United States Coast Guard
- Type: Sector/Air Station
- Role: To patrol coastline from the Mendocino-Sonoma county line north to the California-Oregon border.

Commanders
- Current commander: Captain Scott B. Powers
- Command Master Chief: MECS Joseph Zrelack

Aircraft flown
- Helicopter: 3 MH-65E

Coast Guard Sector/Air Station Humboldt Bay is a United States Coast Guard Air Station and Sector, with command and primary assets located at the Arcata–Eureka Airport in McKinleyville, California, 16 miles north of Eureka in Humboldt County. The station is the site of the command center for all Coast Guard personnel stationed and assets located on the coasts of Humboldt, Mendocino, and Del Norte Counties. It is one of four air stations in the Eleventh Coast Guard District.

== Operations and missions ==
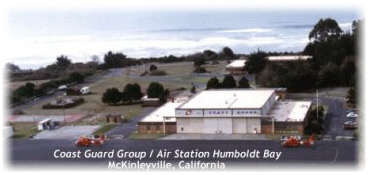
USCG Air Station Humboldt Bay, 2007

Sector/Air Station Humboldt Bay consists of three MH-65E helicopters and the primary mission is search and rescue (SAR). Most cases are dramatic and lifesaving in nature due to the rough seas and generally poor weather conditions prevalent on the northern California coast. The Air Station also provides MEDEVAC support for injured personnel in the surrounding mountains. Secondary missions include aerial support for Aids to Navigation, Maritime Law enforcement, and Marine Environmental Protection along 250 miles of rugged coastline from the Mendocino-Sonoma County line north to the California-Oregon border.

The Command Center located at CGAS Humboldt Bay monitors for distress 24 hours a day and directs Coast Guard boats and aircraft to respond to any maritime emergency in the region; along the coast, well offshore, or inland. The Sector / Air Station also works with many local, state and federal agencies as needed.

== History ==
The Coast Guard has long had a presence on and around Humboldt Bay. Beginning in 1856 and continuing uninterrupted, the service has operated on Humboldt Bay and provided life-saving assistance on the Bay and along the North Coast, at sea and, as time passed, it has assisted other agencies, providing assistance in the interior remote locations, on rivers and lakes and, especially, in mountainous terrain and in forests and related park and private lands as needed.

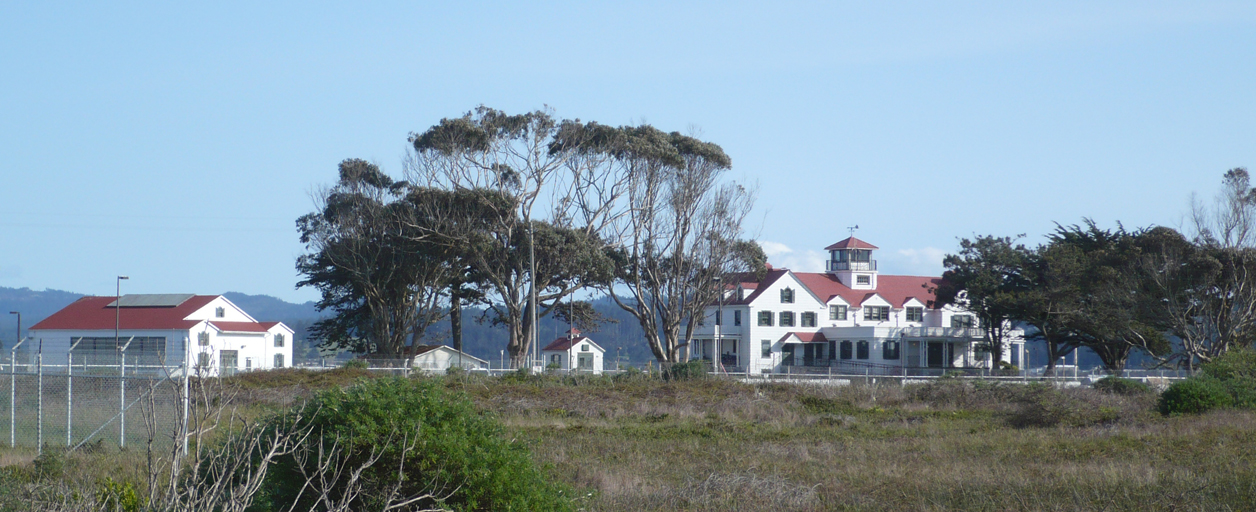
Historic Humboldt Bay Life-Saving Station still in use on the Samoa Peninsula

On Humboldt Bay the USCG has operated at the same site continuously at least since 1878 based at its historic facility, the Humboldt Bay Life-Saving Station. Even with a cutter based at Eureka's docks and another at Crescent City, command in the modern era was split as air support was directed from San Francisco. However, on June 24, 1977, as the culmination of a multi-year initiative by local residents and groups to gain a year-round aviation search and rescue (SAR) facility for Northern California, then Coast Guard Air Station Arcata was commissioned, complete with new assets, at the Arcata–Eureka Airport in McKinleyville, California. Prior to 1977, an aviation detachment from Coast Guard Air Station San Francisco provided air coverage during the summer season, but the response time of over two hours was not fast enough for victims to survive in the 40–50 degree water commonly found along the north coast. Originally named Air Station Arcata, the Air Station was re-designated Air Station Humboldt Bay in May 1982. A $3.5 million facility constructed at the Arcata–Eureka Airport also relocated boat station command and control from the historic facility in Samoa to establish centralized command and control over all Coast Guard assets throughout the region.
