= Coast Guard Air Station Traverse City =

U.S. Coast Guard base in Traverse City, Michigan

Coordinates: 44°44′54″N 85°34′51″W

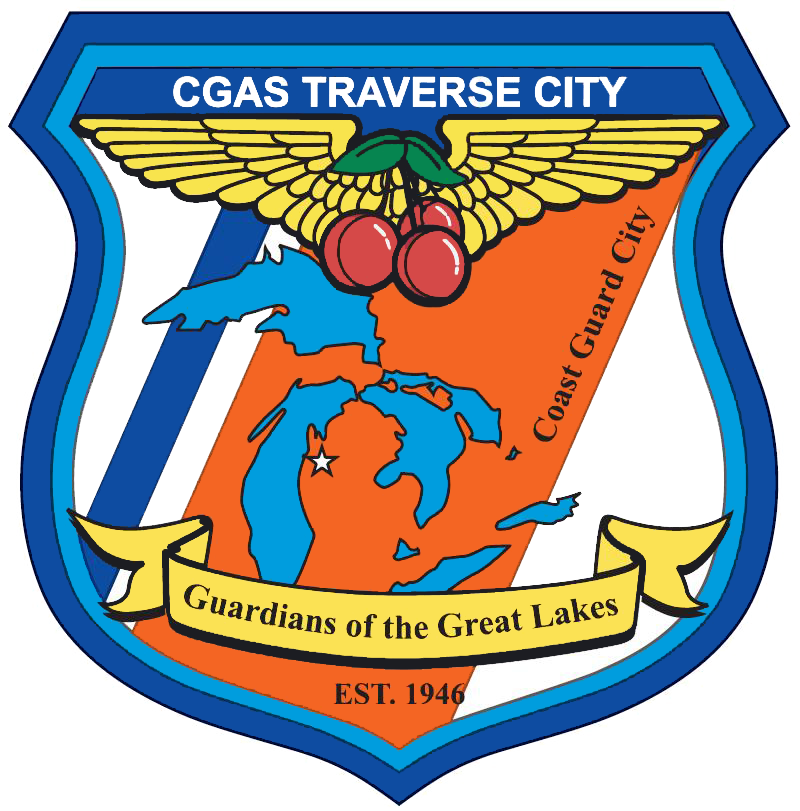
- Unit Patch CGAS Traverse City
- Active: 1946-Present
- Country: United States
- Branch: United States Coast Guard
- Type: Air Station
- Role: Responsible for Search and Rescue, Homeland Security and Law Enforcement throughout the Great Lakes.

Commanders
- Commanding Officer: Andrew Schanno
- Executive Officer: Kyle Russell
- Command Master Chief: Bradford Young

Aircraft flown
- Helicopter: MH-60T "Jayhawks"

Coast Guard Air Station Traverse City is an Air Station of the United States Coast Guard (USCG) located in Traverse City, Michigan. The station was established in 1946 and operates under the authority of the Coast Guard's Ninth District. It is situated on the southern end of Grand Traverse Bay in Northern Michigan at Cherry Capital Airport. Since 1995, Air Station Traverse City has controlled and staffed Air Facilities throughout southern Lake Michigan. The area of operations includes all of Lake Michigan and Lake Superior and most of Lake Huron.

Hangar at Air Station Traverse City

== History ==
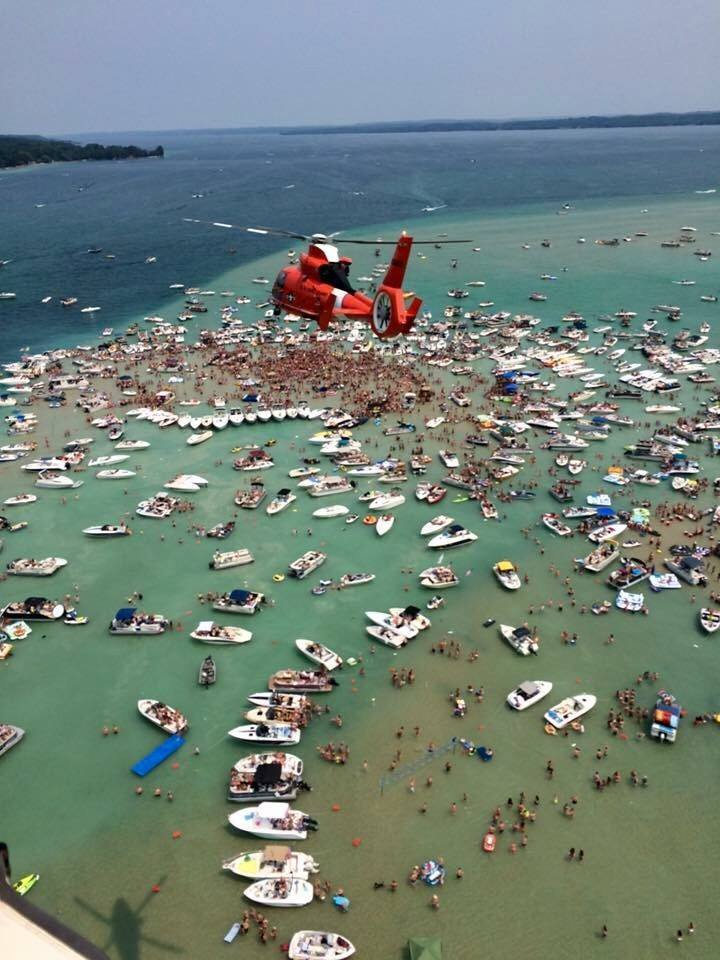
A helicopter from CGAS Traverse City flies over Torch Lake

Originally established as a one-plane detachment to provide Search and Rescue services to the Great Lakes, Coast Guard Air Station Traverse City was commissioned in 1945. Over the years, the Air Station has grown from its original small complement to its present staff size of 20 officers and 100 enlisted personnel.

In 1980, the air station increased its building space when a new maintenance and administrative hangar was completed, providing over 50,000 square feet (4,600 m^{2}) of work space. Along with changes in size, the air station has experienced changes in the types of aircraft assigned over the years. The Consolidated PBY-5A "Catalina" gave way to the Grumman HU-16 "Albatross" seaplane and, eventually, the Dassault HU-25 Falcon. Likewise, the Sikorsky HO4S/3G (or H-19 "Chickasaw") helicopter gave way to the Sikorsky HH-52 "Seaguard" helicopter.

In 1961, Air Station H-19 helicopters assisted in the evacuation of the crew of the Francisco Morazán, an operation that lasted four days in continuous gale conditions. Crews also rescued 25 survivors of the collision between the Cedarville and the Topdalsfjord in 1965, as well as 19 survivors from the fire aboard the Canadian freighter Cartiercliffe Hall in 1979.

Proving their versatility, air station personnel have participated in a variety of other operations. In 1986, a premature baby boy was delivered aboard an HU-25 during an air evacuation (AIREVAC) from Alpena to Traverse City, Michigan. The same year, another Falcon aircraft reported to Patrick AFB, Florida to assist in the recovery search for Space Shuttle Challenger.

Later in 1986, the rescue capabilities of the "Seaguard" helicopter and the patrol capabilities of the "Falcon" jet were combined in the Sikorsky HH-3F "Pelican" helicopter. At that time, Traverse City became a helicopter-only unit, operating three HH-3F helicopters.

Since 1995, Air Station Traverse City has controlled and staffed air facilities throughout southern Lake Michigan. On April 1, 1995, Air Station Chicago transitioned to Air Facility Glenview at the former Naval Air Station Glenview, Illinois and fell under operational control of Air Station Traverse City. However, its colors were retired soon after on November 15, 1996, and the facility ceased operations concurrent with the closure of NAS Glenview due to BRAC action. On April 1, 1997, Air Facility Muskegon was established and with one HH-65A from Traverse City. But on May 25, 2000, Air Facility Waukegan was established, and Air Station Traverse City slowly transferred operations there. On September 30, 2001, Air Station Traverse City completely transferred Air Facility Muskegon to Air Station Detroit at Selfridge Air National Guard Base, Michigan and took control of Air Facility Waukegan. Both air facilities operate from Memorial Day to Labor Day.

== Community Events ==
The station occasionally opens its facilities to public tours. Particularly during Traverse City's National Cherry Festival Airshow, the base allows community members to visit with crewmembers and tour the aircraft the base operates. It also often welcomes aircraft from other bases for public tours. The base also often invites residents of nearby towns to interact crews and aircraft when they visit other airports on training missions.

== Aircraft operated ==
- The station transitioned from four MH-65 Dolphin Helicopters to three Sikorsky MH-60T Jayhawk helicopters in April 2017.
