= Coast Guard Air Station New Orleans =

- Unit Patch CGAS New Orleans
- Active: 1955–present
- Country: United States
- Branch: United States Coast Guard
- Type: Air Station
- Role: To patrol coast of the northern part of the Gulf of Mexico from the border of Florida to Texas
- Website: Official website

Commanders
- Commanding Officer: CDR Armell Balmaceda
- Executive Officer: CDR Scott Koser

Aircraft flown
- Helicopter: MH-60T Jayhawk

Coast Guard Air Station New Orleans is a United States Coast Guard Air Station located at Naval Air Station Joint Reserve Base New Orleans in Belle Chasse, Louisiana.

== History ==
The station was established about July 1955.

== Operations and missions ==
Coast Guard Air Station (CGAS) New Orleans support a multitude of Coast Guard missions worldwide. Air Station New Orleans provides Search & Rescue (SAR) coverage with MH-60T Jayhawk helicopters 24 hours a day, 365 days a year, for 655 nautical miles of shoreline from Apalachicola, Florida to the eastern border of Texas, and 735 nautical miles of the Mississippi River from the mouth of the river to Memphis, Tennessee, averaging more than 320 SAR cases a year.

In 1989, it was most active helicopter station in the Coast Guard.

Other missions include:

- Marine Safety, Marine Environmental Protection,
- Protection of Natural Resources,
- Aids to Navigation support,
- Migrant Interdiction,
- Drug Interdiction, and
- Defense Readiness.
