= Coast Guard Air Station Sitka =

US Coast Guard base in Sitka, Alaska

Coordinates: 57°03′18″N 135°22′06″W

USCG Air Station Sitka
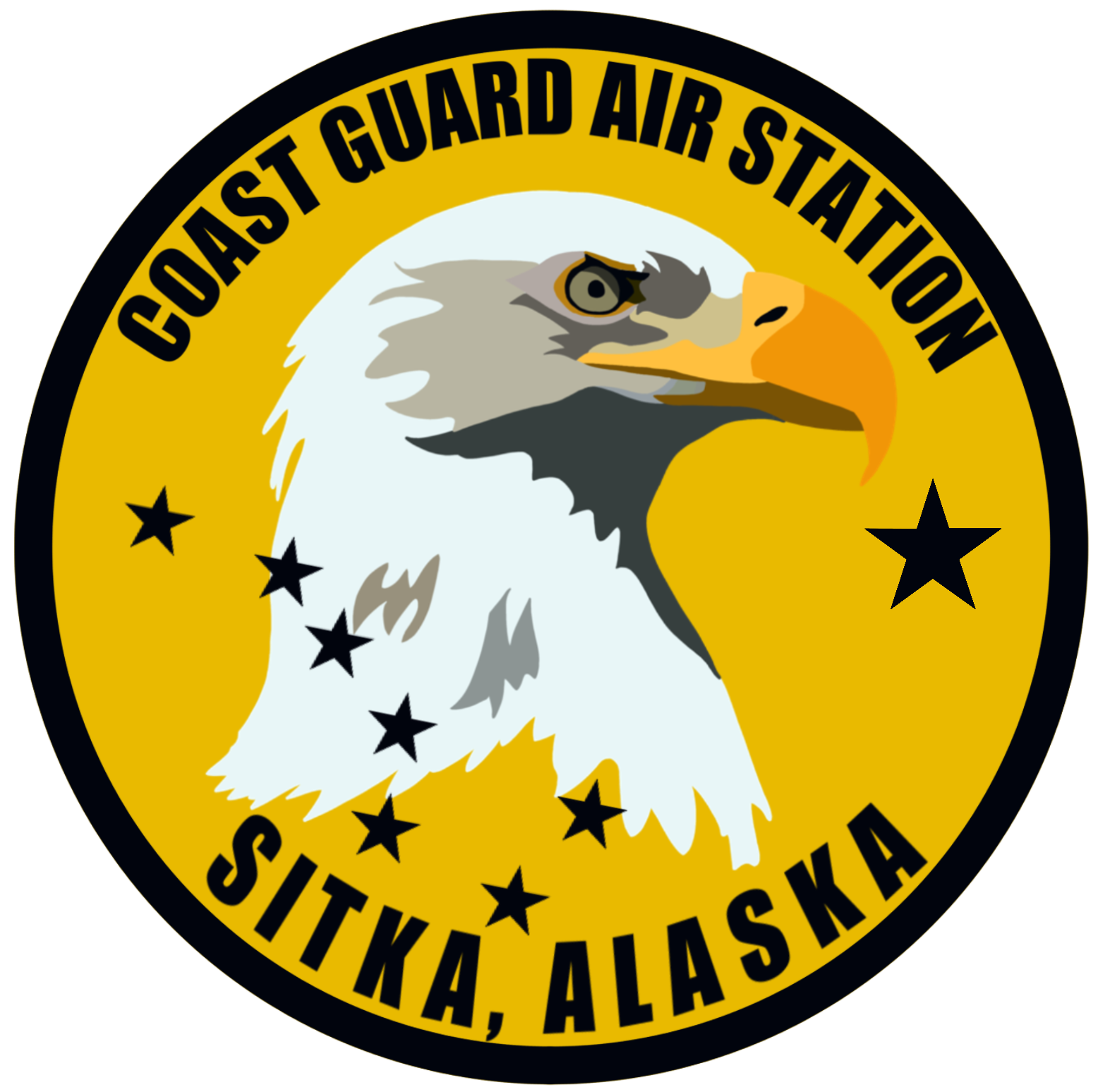
- Unit Emblem (2023–present)
- Active: 1977 to present
- Country: United States
- Branch: United States Coast Guard
- Type: Air Station
- Role: Search & Rescue
- Size: 130 active personnel

Commanders
- Commanding Officer: CDR J. Rand Semke
- Executive Officer: CDR Jonathan I. Welch
- Command Master Chief: ASTCM Laurence "Noodles" Nettles

Aircraft flown
- Helicopter: 3 x MH-60T Jayhawk

Coast Guard Air Station Sitka is an Air Station of the United States Coast Guard located in Sitka, Alaska. The station was originally established on Annette Island in March 1944, until relocating to Sitka in 1977. Early aircraft consisted of Grumman G-21's, PBY's, HU-16's, HH-52's, and HH-3 Pelicans. Primary missions performed by the air station are Search and Rescue (SAR), law enforcement, and logistics covering the Southeast part of Alaska. Area of responsibility encompasses approximately 180,000 square miles of water and land extending across Southeast Alaska from Dixon Entrance to Icy Bay, and from the Alaskan-Canadian border to the central Gulf of Alaska. This includes 12,000 miles of coastline distinguished by a rugged coast, mountainous terrain, severe weather, and many remote villages.

Today, Air Station Sitka maintains three MH-60T Jayhawk helicopters and has 130 officers, enlisted, and civilian personnel. Each helicopter is crewed by two pilots, a flight mechanic, and a rescue swimmer, has a 125-knot cruise speed, and 700-mile range. These aircrews are in a “ready” or “alert” status 24 hours a day for national defense, search and rescue, and other missions. Sitka crews fly surveillance patrols and transport environmental response teams which protect the ecosystems located within the area. Additionally, crews assists in the routine maintenance, outage response, and position verification of over 75 aids-to-navigation (ATON). Other missions include law enforcement duties in cooperation with federal, state, and local agencies.

== Notable members ==
CDR John B. Whiddon
