= Coast Guard Air Station San Diego =

US Coast Guard base in San Diego, California

Coordinates: 32.7271°N 117.1818°W

U.S. Coast Guard Air Station San Diego
- Unit Patch CGAS San Diego
- Active: April 1937 – present
- Country: United States
- Branch: United States Coast Guard
- Type: Air station

Aircraft flown
- Helicopter: MH-60T Jayhawk

U.S. Coast Guard Air Station San Diego (CGAS San Diego) is a Coast Guard Air Station in San Diego, California, United States, adjacent to San Diego International Airport. It operates three MH-60T Jayhawk helicopters off the Coast Guard ramp.

CGAS San Diego is co-located with Sector San Diego. The air station is physically separated from San Diego International Airport. CGAS San Diego had the HU-25 fixed wing aircraft until the entire CG fleet was decommissioned in 2014. Since CGAS San Diego does not have a runway, the HU-25 would have cross a busy, six-lane city street (North Harbor Drive) in order to access the runways at San Diego International Airport. The CGAS had the ability stop eastbound/westbound traffic with the use of a flashing light hanging over the roadway. Today, CGAS San Diego only has rotary winged aircraft.

== History ==
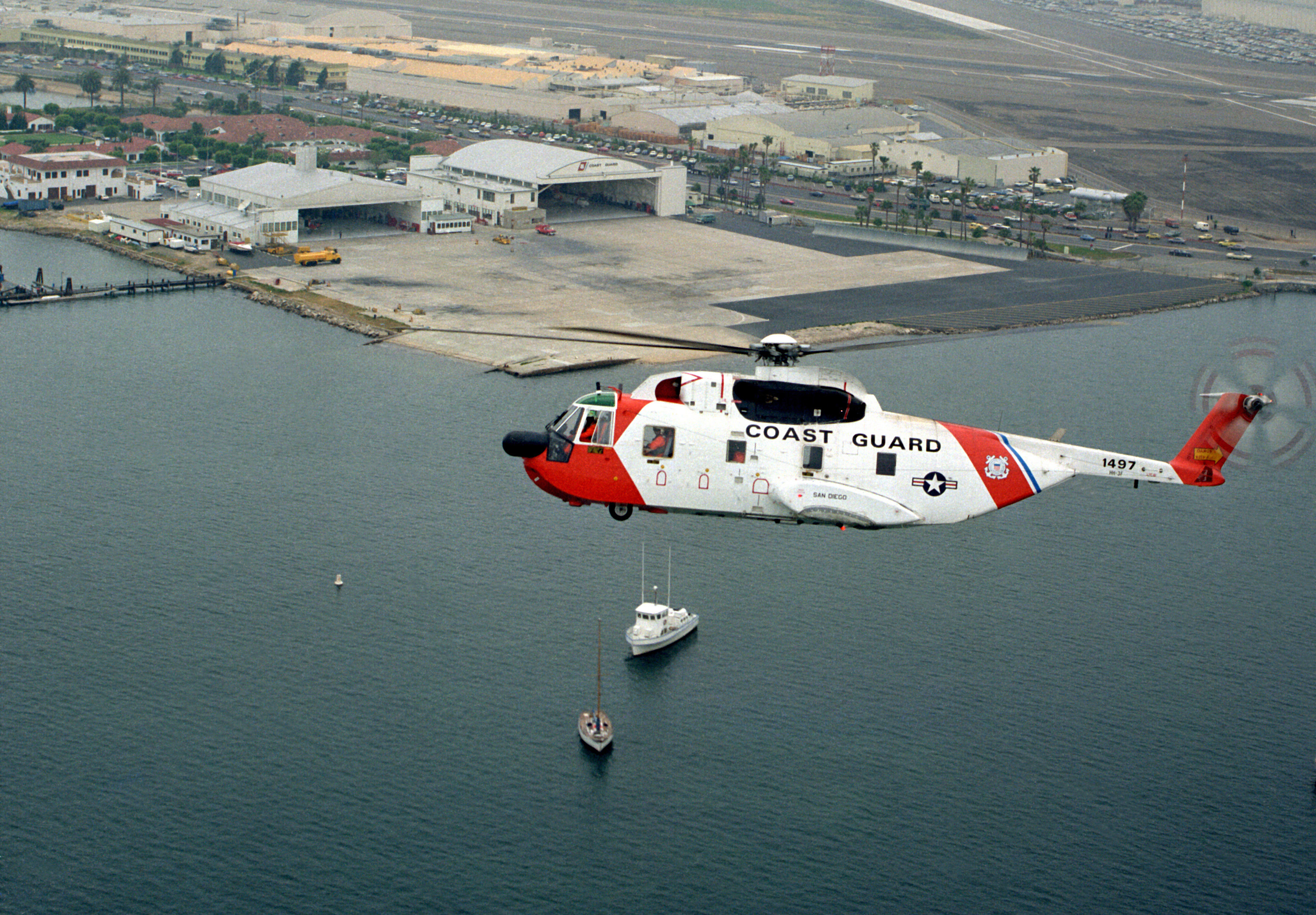
An HH-3F over CGAS San Diego, 1981.

Lindbergh Field opened on October 16, 1934, on Pacific Highway. San Diego International Airport's East Terminal opened on March 6, 1967, and the West Terminal opened July 11, 1979. A new Commuter Terminal opened July 23, 1996. It is self-contained, full service facility with four gates used by seven commuter airlines to handle 25,000 passengers each day. Construction of the expansion of the West Terminal ended in November, 1997. Almost 14 million passengers travel through Lindbergh Field each year. The 27 passenger and cargo airlines operate more than 500 flights each day from the runways.

On December 11, 1935, negotiations between the City of San Diego and the U.S. Government were concluded which provided 23 acres (93,000 m^{2}) of tideland for the construction of a Coast Guard Air Station adjacent to Lindbergh Field, the municipal airport. This project had the strong support of many people and agencies, and particularly the Harbor Commission and Department of San Diego and the Chamber of Commerce. The area for this station was deeded to the Coast Guard at no cost, after approval by citizens of San Diego, at a municipal election held in April 1935.

Construction of the Air Station was undertaken in 1936 with funds provided by the Federal Public Works Administration. The M.H. Golden Co. was the contractor. The area had to be dredged from the bay and filled and brought up to grade level. Long piles were driven in the soil at the building sites for stabilization. The contract called for one hangar with lean-to, a mess hall, a barracks building, two aprons, a runway to the field, and a small wooden seaplane ramp. During and prior to this time a Coast Guard Air Detachment was maintained on Lindbergh Field in one-half of a commercial hangar. This detachment was led by Elmer F. Stone after May 21, 1935. Stone is one of Coast Guard Aviation's most colorful figures.

In April 1937, the Air Station was commissioned. The first commanding officer was LT S.C. Linholm, who later became Commander of Eleventh Coast Guard District. There had, however, been an Air Patrol Detachment active in San Diego between 1934 and 1937. At the time this was the only Coast Guard air base in California.

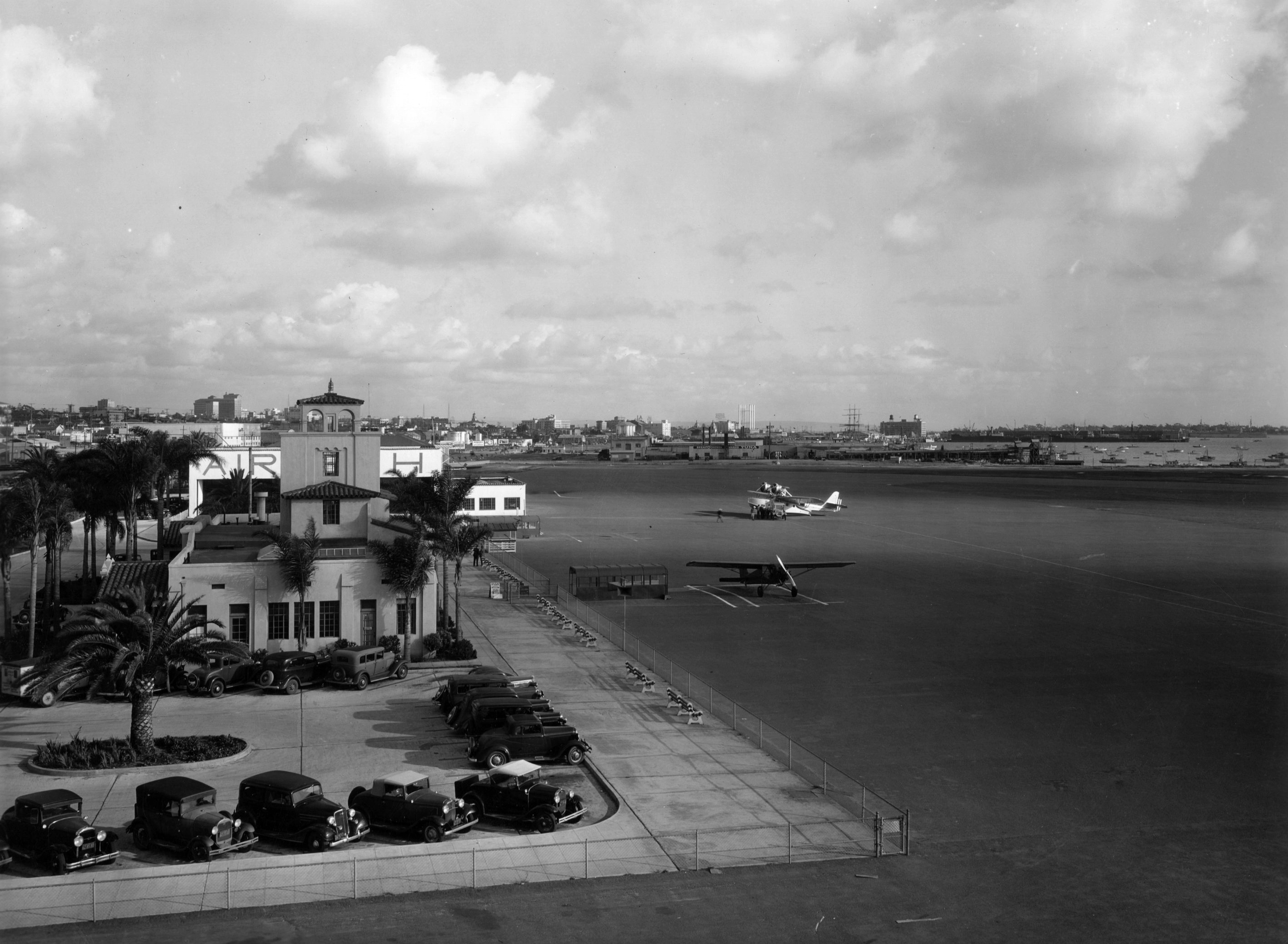
CGAS San Diego, circa 1938.

Coast Guard Air Station San Diego saw no radical changes as a result of the declaration of war in 1941. The unit continued to watch and report the activities of fishing boats in the area, to provide assistance in cases of distress, and to provide transportation by air for other government departments. Air Sea Rescue operations were given primary focus from October 1943 on. Between January 1 and December 1, 1944, a total of 124 aircraft went down in waters covered by this unit. Of the 201 pilots and crewmen involved, 137 were saved, 59 were killed outright by mid-air collisions or impact with the water, two are missing, and three who might have been saved were lost because of improper equipment or the failure to locate them promptly.

In June 1972, a major rebuilding plan was proposed. On January 26, 1983, a ceremony was held signaling the completion of the project.

In April 1997, the Port of San Diego began a master plan for San Diego International Airport. The goal of the plan is to provide incremental, cost-effective improvements to SDIA to meet the region's near-term demand for air service while a long-term regional air transportation strategy is developed in collaboration with the San Diego Association of Governments (SANDAG) and other transportation agencies.
