= Astoria Regional Airport =

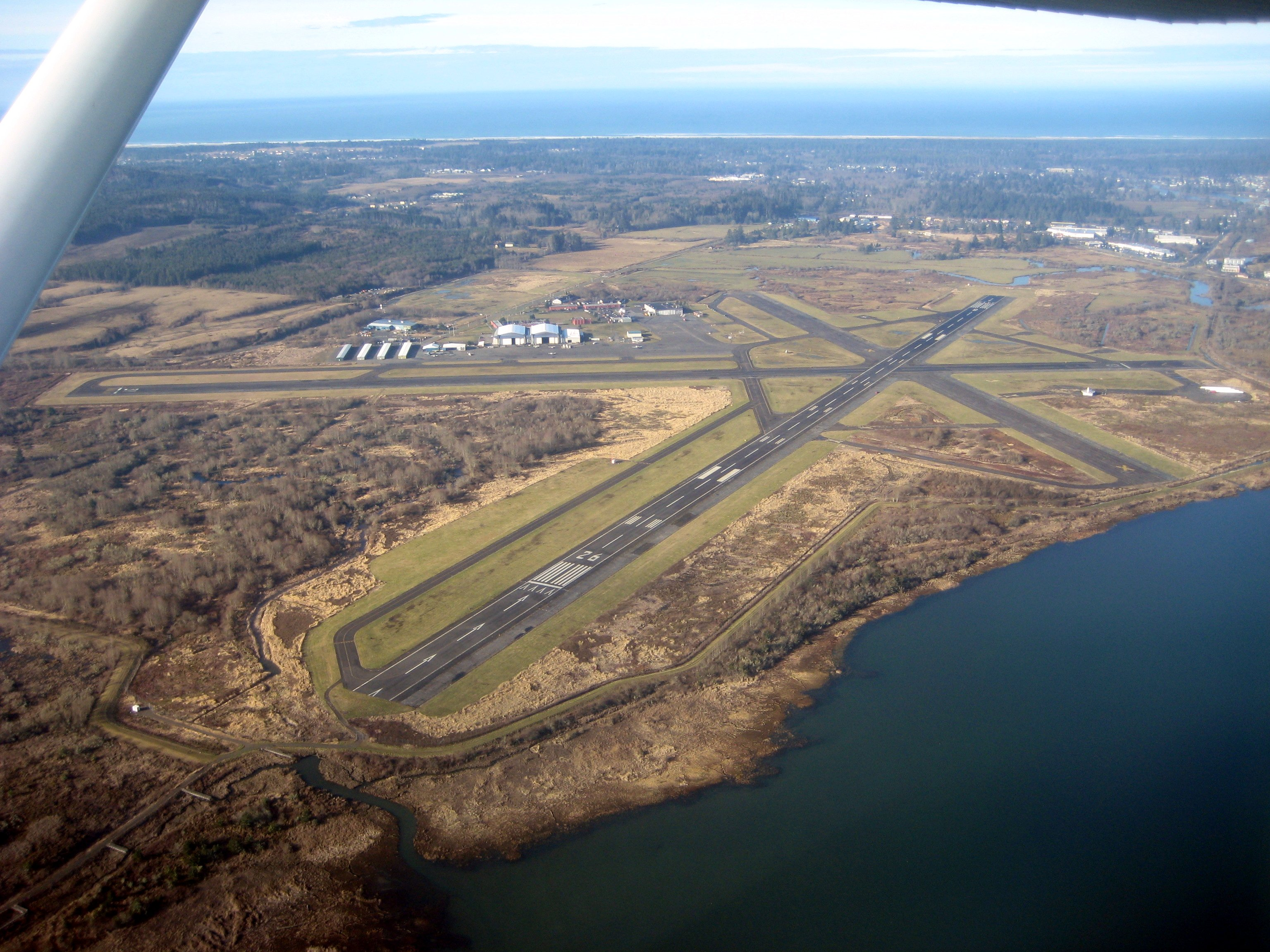
- IATA: AST; ICAO: KAST; FAA LID: AST

Summary
- Airport type: Public
- Owner: Port of Astoria
- Serves: Astoria, Oregon
- Location: Warrenton, Oregon
- Elevation AMSL: 14 ft (4.3 m)
- Coordinates: 46°09′29″N 123°52′43″W
- Website: PortOfAstoria.com/airport

Map
- Location of airport in Oregon / United States AST (the United States)

Runways
Direction	Length		Surface
Direction	ft	m	Surface
08/26	5,794	1,766	Asphalt
14/32	4,467	1,362	Asphalt

Statistics (2019)
- Aircraft operations (year ending 9/17/2019): 38,721
- Based aircraft: 36
- Source: Federal Aviation Administration

Astoria Regional Airport (IATA: AST, ICAO: KAST, FAA LID: AST) is a joint civil-military public airport in Warrenton, three miles southwest of Astoria, in Clatsop County, Oregon. The airport is owned by the Port of Astoria and is the home of Coast Guard Air Station Astoria.

The airport has no airline flights. Flights to Portland International Airport were most recently provided by SeaPort Airlines from March 2008 until Spring of 2010. Until 1974-75 Astoria had flights on West Coast Airlines and its successors.

Federal Aviation Administration records say the airport had 1,851 passenger boardings (enplanements) in calendar year 2008, 1,531 in 2009 and 3,482 in 2010. The National Plan of Integrated Airport Systems for 2011–2015 categorized it as a general aviation facility based on enplanements in 2008 (the commercial service category requires 2,500 per year) but it would be categorized as commercial service - non-primary based in enplanements in 2010.

== Facilities ==
Astoria Regional Airport covers 870 acres (352 ha) at an elevation of 15 feet (5 m). It has two asphalt runways: 8/26 is 5,794 by 100 feet (1,766 x 30 m) and 14/32 is 4,467 by 100 feet (1,362 x 30 m).

In the year ending September 17, 2019 the airport had 38,721 aircraft operations, average 106 per day: 59% general aviation, 36% military, and 4% air taxi. 36 aircraft were then based at the airport: 26 single-engine, 5 multi-engine, 2 helicopter, and 3 military.

The airport houses a United States Coast Guard station with service and controls for three HH-60 helicopters and three motor life boat rescue stations located on the Oregon and Washington coasts.

== See also ==
- Coast Guard Air Station Astoria
