= Coast Guard Air Station Borinquen =

US Coast Guard base in Aguadilla, Puerto Rico

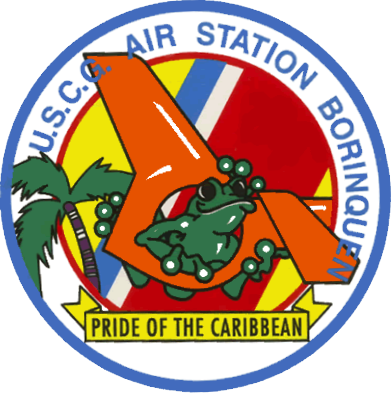
- Unit Patch CGAS Borinquen
- Active: 1976–present
- Country: United States
- Branch: United States Coast Guard
- Type: Air Station

Commanders
- Current commander: Captain Lawrence Gaillard

Aircraft flown
- Helicopter: MH-65D Dolphin; MH-60 Jayhawk

Coast Guard Air Station Borinquen is a United States Coast Guard Air Station located at the Rafael Hernandez International Airport (formerly Ramey Air Force Base), in Aguadilla, Puerto Rico.

== History ==
United States Coast Guard Air Station Borinquen is the direct descendant of the former Coast Guard Air Station San Juan, which was located at the former Naval Air Station Isla Grande. In November 1971, the Air Station relocated to its present location at what was then Ramey Air Force Base, a Strategic Air Command (SAC) B-52 bomber and KC-135 aerial refueling aircraft base in Aguadilla, and became known as Coast Guard Air Station Puerto Rico. Two years later the United States Air Force discontinued its operation at Ramey AFB, turning the facilities over to the Commonwealth of Puerto Rico and the United States Navy Naval Station Roosevelt Roads West Annex. The Coast Guard assumed the host role in July 1976, when the Navy vacated the station. It was then that the unit was designated Coast Guard Air Station Borinquen. The Air Station originally utilized three HU-16E Albatross amphibious seaplanes and two HH-52A Sea Guard helicopters to effect its search and rescue missions. In March 1973, three HH-3F Pelican helicopters replaced these aircraft.

The need for increased range for law enforcement and search and rescue resulted in the addition of four HU-25A Falcon jets to the Air Station's inventory in late 1983 and early 1984. In 1985, four new HH-65A Dolphin short-range rescue helicopters replaced the three HH-3F Pelicans, giving the Air Station a shipboard deployment capability. The HU-25As were replaced in 1987 by three HC-130H Hercules aircraft that provided long range search and surveillance capability until their departure in June 1996. Due to the increased tempo of operations in the Caribbean, the Air Station again added four HU-25As to the inventory from July 1999 until September 2001. The Air Station currently operates with 4 MH-65D Dolphin helicopters while also supporting a variety of other forward deployed aircraft.

== Operations ==
U.S. Coast Guard Air Station Borinquen is under the operational control of Commander, the Seventh Coast Guard District. Its main operation is search and rescue missions, Secondary missions include: law enforcement, aerial support for ATON, and logistic support. Coast Guard Air Station Borinquen also provides support for U.S. Coast Guard vessels and aircraft, and other United States Department of Homeland Security agencies such as the CBP Air and Marine Operations and the United States Border Patrol Ramey Sector nearby the Air Station Borinquen.

The number of personnel at U.S. Coast Guard Air Station Borinquen is made of 170 enlisted personnel, 35 officers and 150 civilians.

== Base Facilities ==
- Air Station Borinquen Dental Clinic
- Air Station Borinquen Medical Clinic
- Base Borinquen MWR Pool (Aquatic Facility)
- Base Chapel
- Coast Guard Exchange & Gas Station (Located on 91 Wing Road)
- Borinquen Fitness Center
- Child Development Center
- Coast Guard Housing Area
- Community Center - The Pelican Bar & Grill
- E-Lounge located on School Road next to the LaPlaza Building
- Hangar for U.S. Coast Guard Aircraft and adjacent facilities
- U.S. Coast Guard Recruiting Office (Located on 260 Guard Road)
- MWR Guest Cottages
- Ray Park
- ID Card Office
- Post Library
- Tennis Courts and Basketball Court
- Recreation Gear Locker
- Youth Center - Boys & Girls Club

== Education ==
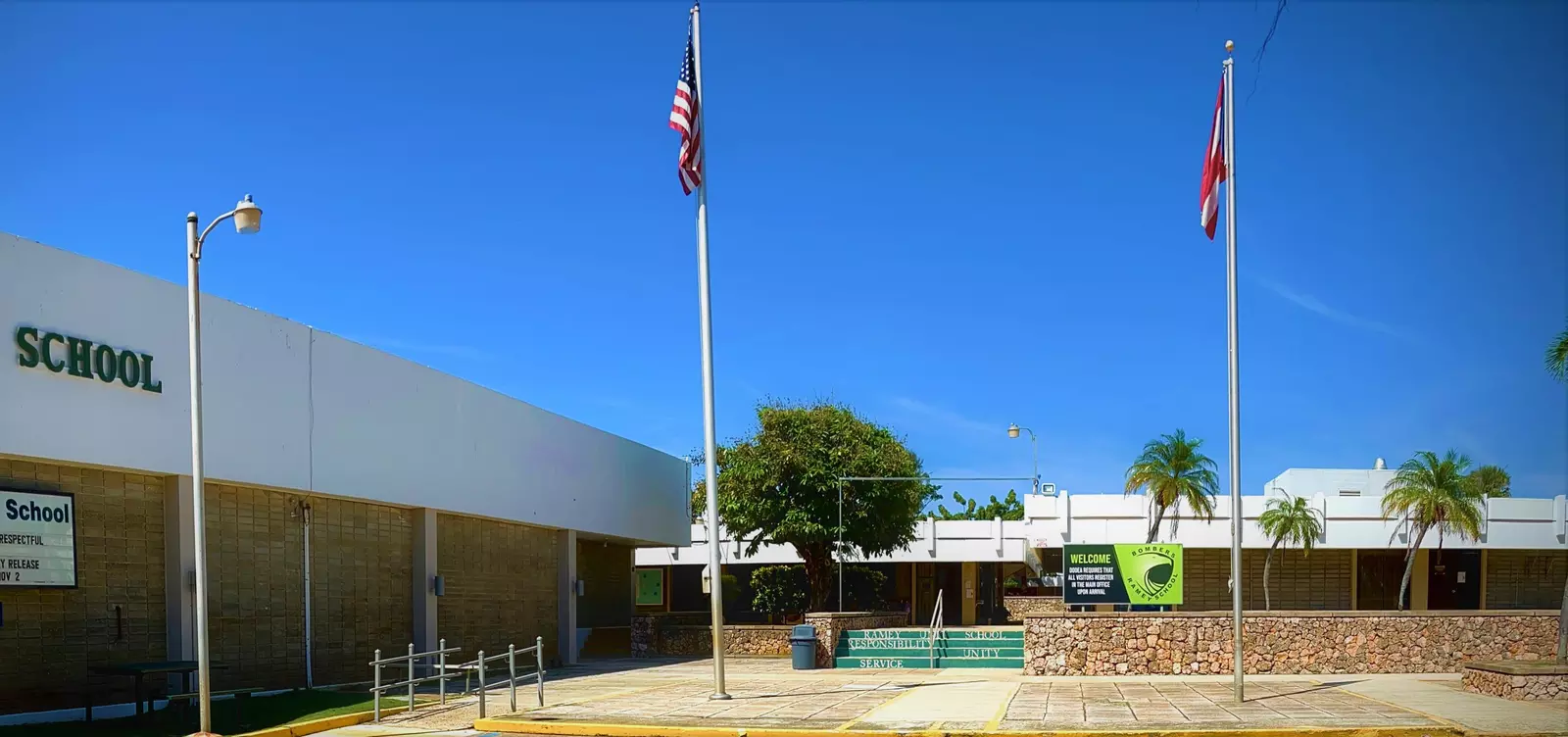
Ramey Unit School

The Department of Defense Education Activity (DoDEA) operates Ramey Unit School located on 201 Arch Road (Pre-Kindergarten through Grade 12).
