= Coast Guard Air Station Astoria =

US Coast Guard base in Warrenton, Oregon

Coordinates: 46.1553°N 123.885°W

CGAS Astoria
- Unit patch of CGAS Astoria
- Active: 1964 to present
- Country: United States
- Branch: United States Coast Guard
- Type: Coast Guard Air Station
- Role: Search & Rescue
- Size: 89 Personnel
- Garrison/HQ: Astoria Regional Airport

Commanders
- Commanding Officer: CDR Neal A. Corbin
- Executive Officer: CDR Amanda W. Denning
- Command Senior Chief: AMTCS Jason Upshaw

Aircraft flown
- Helicopter: MH-60T Jayhawk

Coast Guard Air Station Astoria was established on August 14, 1964, at Astoria Regional Airport in Warrenton, Oregon, United States.

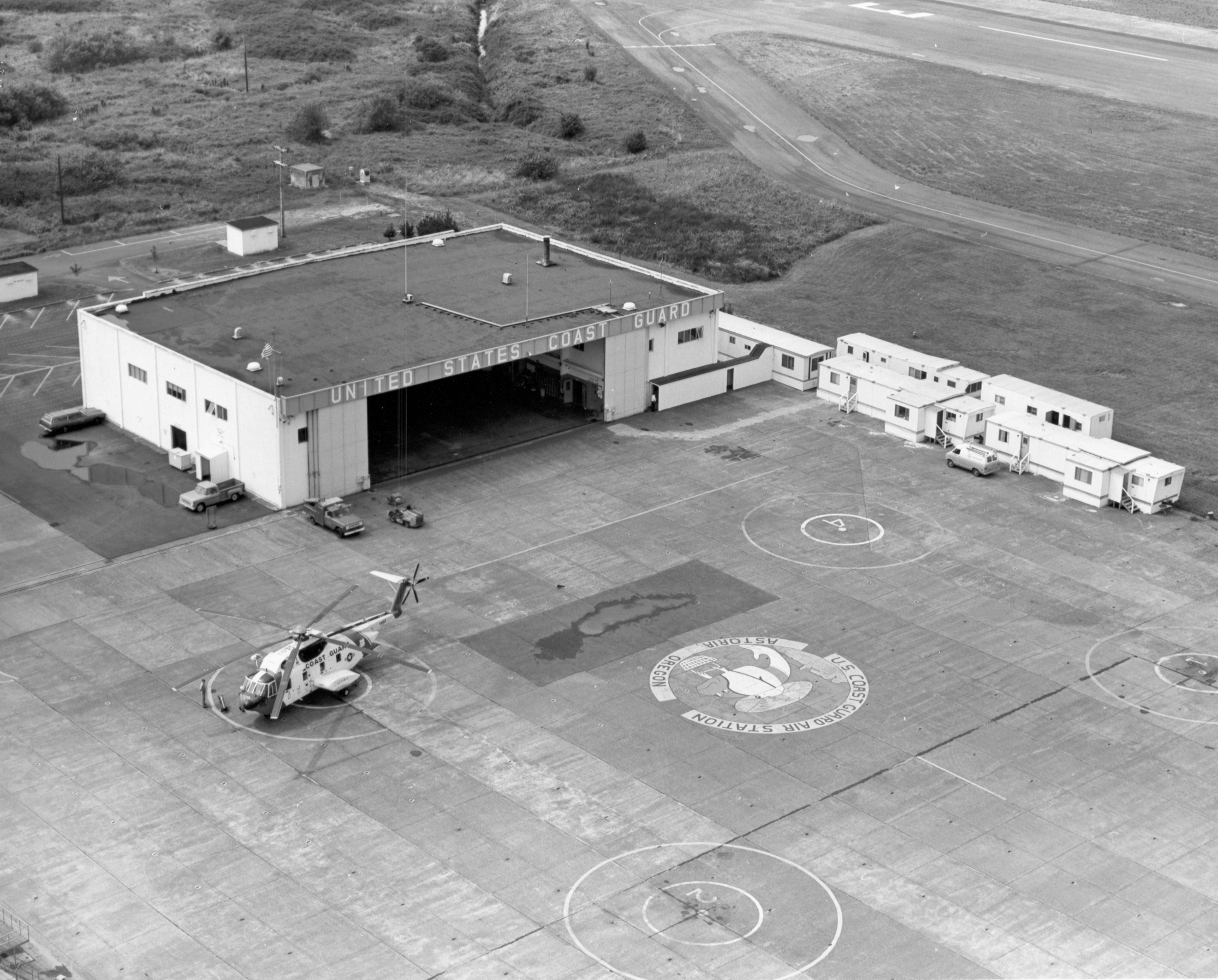
CGAS Astoria, 1974

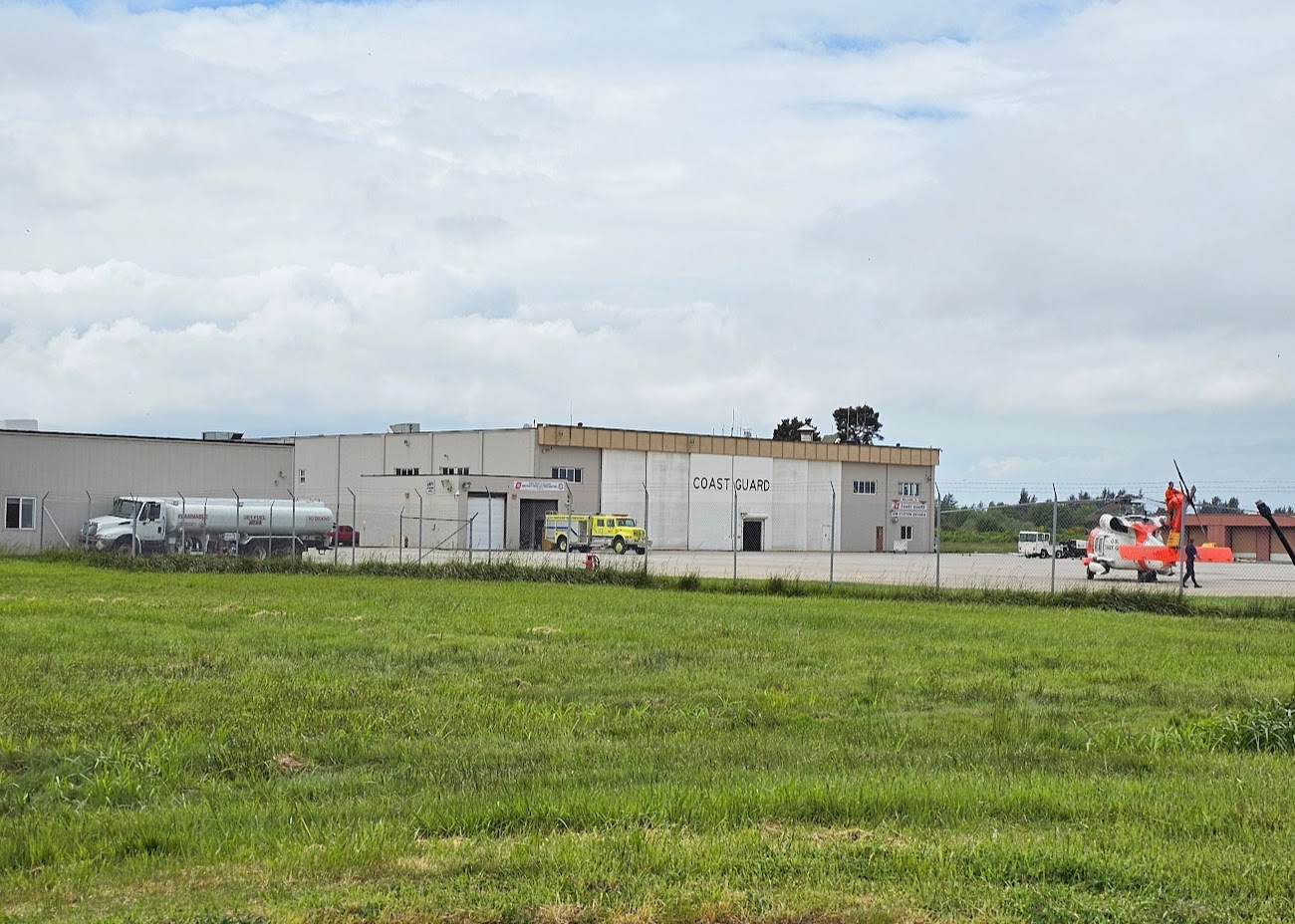
CGAS Astoria, 2026

The unit houses 85 active duty, three reserve duty and three civilian personnel. The unit operates three Sikorsky MH-60 Jayhawk helicopters. The unit's functions include search and rescue, law enforcement, aids to navigational support, and environmental protection.

Air Station Astoria served as one of the filming locations for the movie The Guardian (2006).

== Historically operated aircraft ==
- Sikorsky HH-52A Seaguard
- Sikorsky HH-3F Pelican
- Dassault HU-25A Falcon
