= Sikorsky MH-60 Jayhawk =

Medium-range recovery helicopter

HH-60J / MH-60T Jayhawk
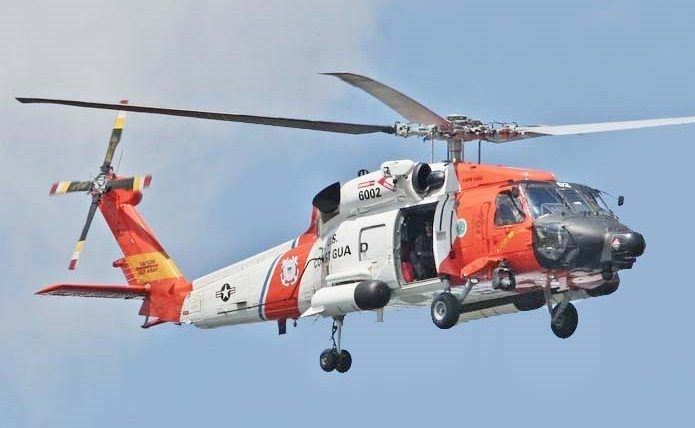
- Jayhawk from Coast Guard Air Station Astoria

General information
- Type: Medium-range recovery helicopter
- Manufacturer: Sikorsky Aircraft
- Status: In service
- Primary user: United States Coast Guard
- Number built: 42 (+ 6 conversions)

History
- Manufactured: 1990–1996
- First flight: 8 August 1989
- Developed from: Sikorsky SH-60 Seahawk

The Sikorsky MH-60T Jayhawk is a multi-mission, twin-engine, medium-range helicopter built by Sikorsky Aircraft and operated by the United States Coast Guard for various missions including search and rescue, law enforcement, military readiness and marine environmental protection. It was originally designated HH-60J before being upgraded and redesignated in 2007.

Chosen to replace the HH-3F Pelican, the MH-60T is a member of the Sikorsky S-70 family of helicopters and is based on the U.S. Navy's SH-60 Seahawk helicopter, itself based on the U.S. Army's UH-60 Black Hawk helicopter. Development began in September 1986, first flight was achieved on 8 August 1989, and the first HH-60J entered USCG service in June 1990. Production ended in 1996 after 42 helicopters were produced; six retired Seahawks were also remanufactured to MH-60T specifications beginning in 2010.

In 2017, the USCG established a Service Life Extension Program to extend the service life of its current MH-60T fleet by rebuilding the aircraft with either newly manufactured hulls manufactured by Sikorsky or by conversion of retired US Navy aircraft. In 2023, the USCG obtained approval to begin acquisition of 12 additional MH-60Ts to replace some MH-65 Dolphin aircraft, the other helicopter type in the Coast Guard's inventory. In 2023, USCG received approval to transition to an all MH-60T helicopter fleet, and grew the fleet to 127 aircraft.

== Development ==
Chosen to replace the HH-3F Pelican, the HH-60J was based on the United States Navy's SH-60 Seahawk and a member of the Sikorsky S-70 helicopter family. Compared to its predecessor the HH-3F, the HH-60J is lighter, faster, and equipped with more sophisticated electronics and more powerful engines. The HH-60J was developed in conjunction with the U.S. Navy's HH-60H Rescue Hawk.

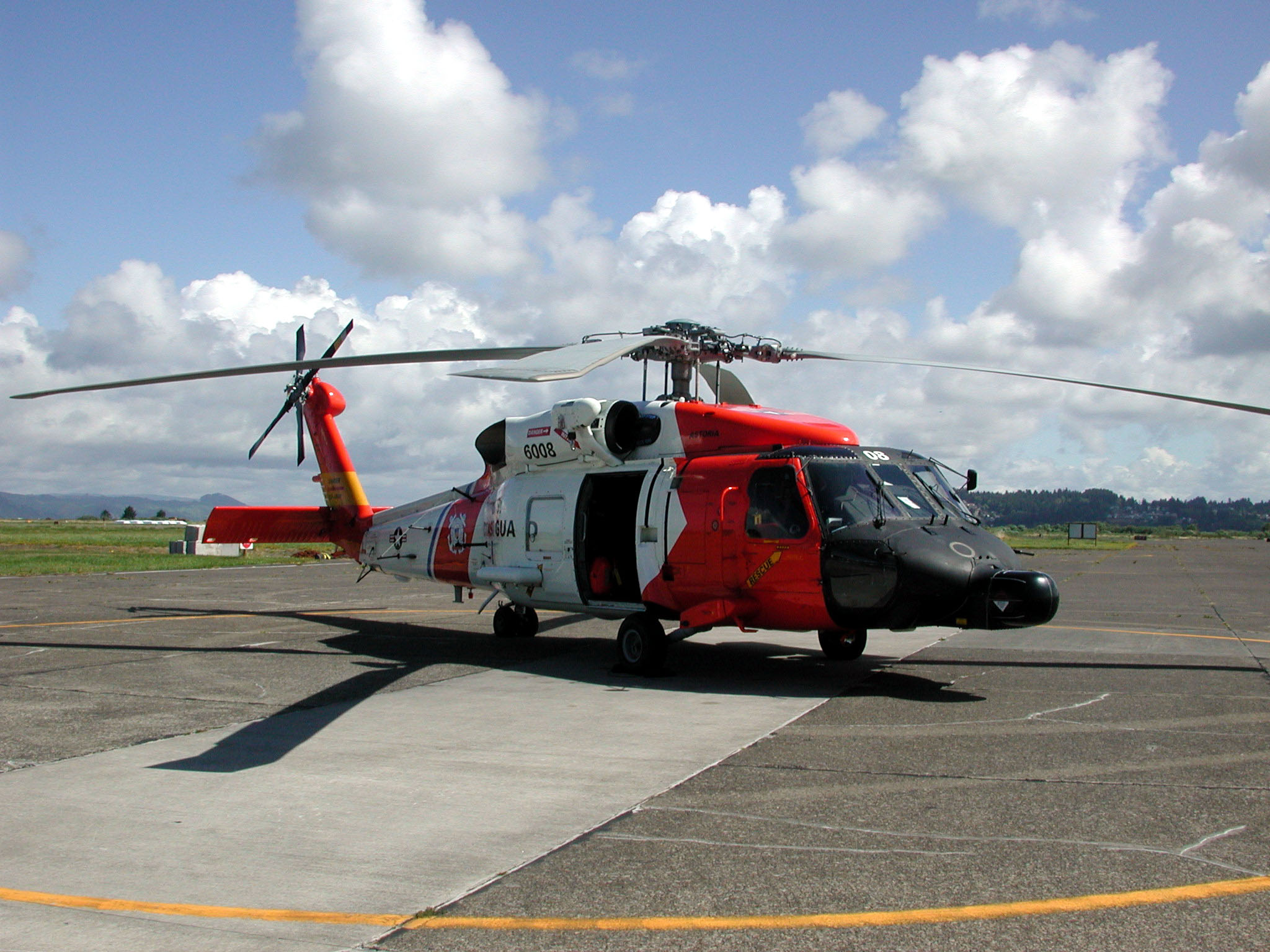
Jayhawk (USCG registration number 6008) on the tarmac at Coast Guard Air Station Astoria

Sikorsky began development in September 1986 and aircraft registration number 6001 achieved first flight on 8 August 1989. The first aircraft was delivered to the USCG for developmental testing in March 1990 at NAS Patuxent River, Maryland. In March 1991, ATC Mobile, Alabama became the first USCG unit to fly the HH-60J, allowing instructor pilots to prepare for pilot training. Coast Guard Air Station Elizabeth City, North Carolina was the first USCG operational unit to fly the HH-60J. Sikorsky produced 42 HH-60Js with sequential registration numbers from 6001 through 6042. Sikorsky ended production in 1996 after completing the 42 units on contract. Subsequently, the Coast Guard has converted six ex-Navy SH-60F Seahawks into MH-60T Jayhawks (registration numbers 6043-6048) in order to replace aircraft lost to attrition and expand the fleet.

=== MH-60T upgrade program ===
The USCG began converting its 42 HH-60Js to MH-60Ts in January 2007. This avionics and capabilities upgrade is part of the USCG's Integrated Deepwater System Program and provide a glass cockpit, an enhanced electro-optic/infrared sensor system as well as a radar sensor system and airborne use of force capability. The airborne use of force package includes both weapons for firing warning and disabling shots and armor to protect the aircrew from small arms fire. The MH-60T upgrades were completed in February 2014.

== Design ==
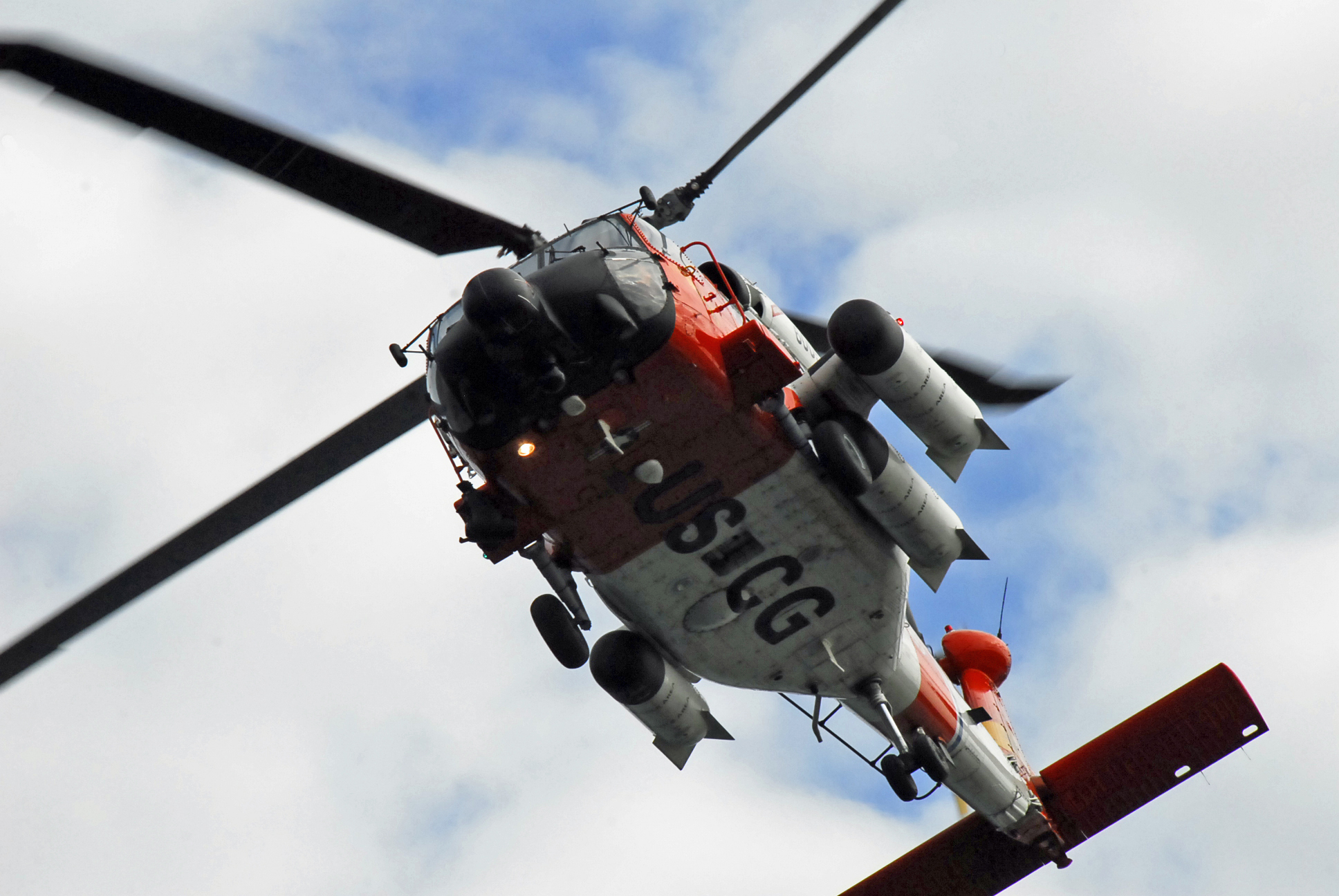
Jayhawk from Coast Guard Air Station Kodiak

The normal cruising speed of the MH-60T is 135 to 140 kn (155 to 161 mph; 250 to 259 km/h) and the aircraft is capable of reaching 180 kn (207 mph; 333 km/h) for short durations. It can fly at 140 kn (161 mph; 259 km/h) for six to seven hours. With a fuel capacity of 6,460 lb (2,930 kg), the helicopter is designed to fly a crew of four up to 260 nmi (482 km) offshore, hoist up to six additional people on board while remaining on-scene for up to 45 minutes and return to base while maintaining an adequate fuel reserve.

The Jayhawk has a radar for search/weather that gives its nose a distinctive look. A forward looking infrared (FLIR) sensor turret can be mounted below its nose. It can carry three 120 US gal (454 L) fuel tanks with two on the port side rack and one on the starboard side rack. The starboard side also carries a 600 lbf (2.67 kN) capacity rescue hoist mounted above the door. The hoist has 200 ft (61.0 m) of cable. The helicopter is normally based on land but can be based on 270 foot medium endurance Coast Guard Cutters (WMEC) or 418 foot Legend-Class National Security Cutters (WMSL) .

The MH-60T is equipped with a 7.62 mm M240H medium machine gun and a .50 in Barrett M82 semi-automatic rifle for firing warning and disabling shots. These weapons also serve as defensive armament.

== Operational history ==
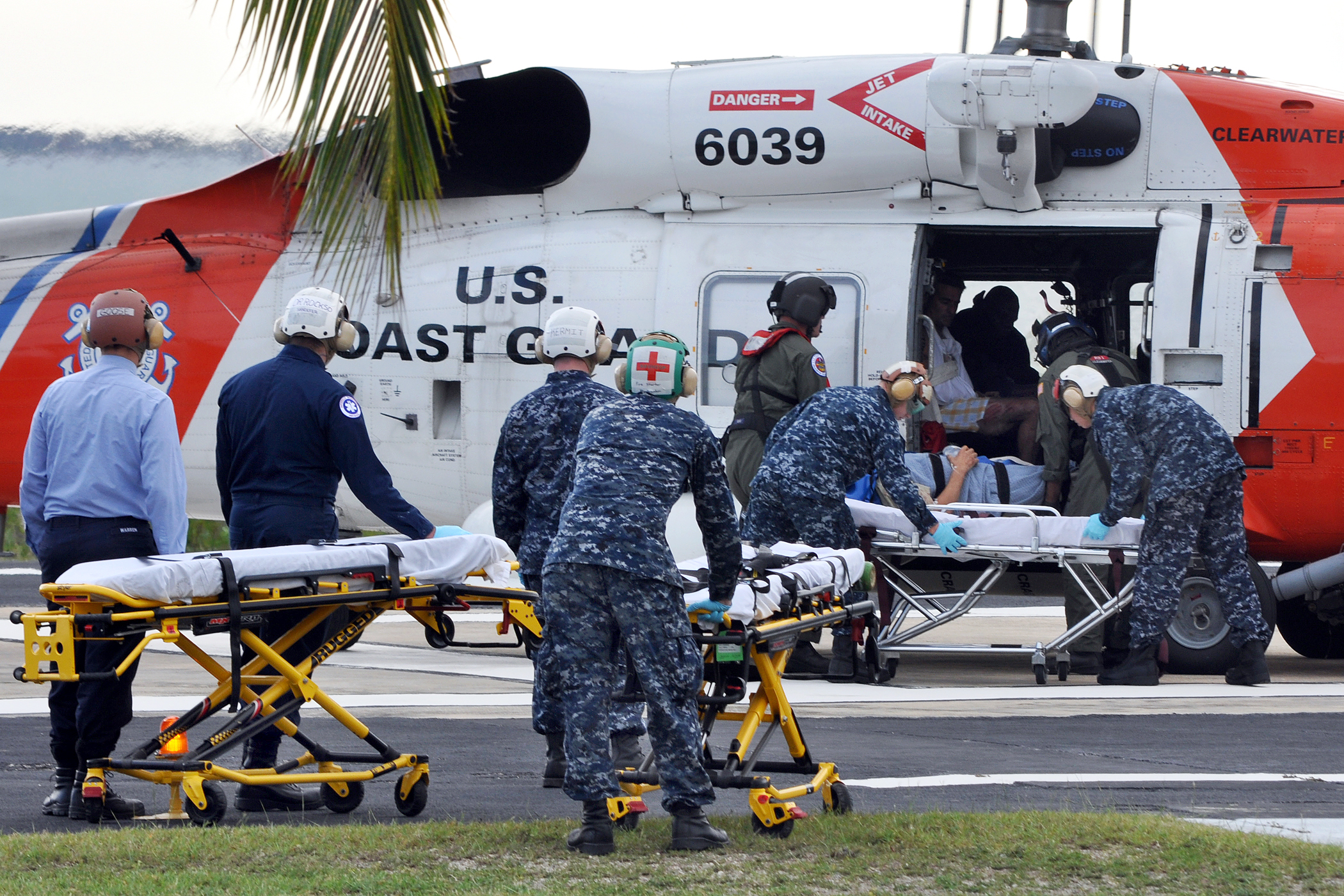
Haitian earthquake victims are unloaded from a Jayhawk at U.S. Naval Hospital Guantanamo Bay.

In 1990, HH-60J Jayhawks began replacing HH-3F Pelican and CH-3E Sea King helicopters in service with the US Coast Guard. HH-60Js perform search and rescue missions, along with other missions such as maritime patrol and drug interdiction. Coast Guard cutters with their HH-60Js and other helicopters performed security and interdiction in the Persian Gulf in 1991 in support of Operation Desert Storm and also in 2003 for Operation Enduring Freedom.

Starting in 2009, Coast Guard Jayhawks have been tasked with a secondary mission of drug patrol/enforcement. These missions are usually conducted in cooperation with Coast Guard cutters.

In 2016, some Jayhawks were delivered in a yellow color scheme celebrating 100 years of Coast Guard aviation. The yellow color scheme represented colors used on certain Coast Guard and Navy helicopters in the 1940s and 1950s. The first of the operational aircraft in this color scheme was delivered to Air Station Astoria in Oregon on 15 January 2016.

== Variants ==
HH-60J
Medium range recovery helicopter. Forty-two units delivered to the US Coast Guard between 1990 and 1996.
MH-60T
Medium range recovery helicopter. Thirty-nine surviving HH-60J airframes received upgraded avionics and operational capabilities, including armament, from 2007 to 2014. Six SH-60Fs have also been converted to MH-60T specifications. Forty-five were active as of March 2024. A Service Life Extension Program began in 2017 to provide 12,000 to 20,000 hours of available service life to each aircraft. In 2023, the Coast Guard received approval to transition to an all MH-60T rotary fleet and grow that fleet to 127 aircraft.

== Operators ==
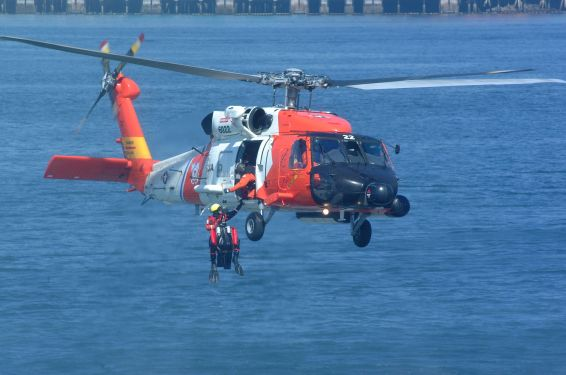
Jayhawk retrieves a rescue swimmer

United States

- United States Coast Guard 45 MH-60s in service.
  - CGAS Astoria
  - CGAS Borinquen
  - CGAS Cape Cod
  - CGAS Clearwater
  - CGAS Elizabeth City
  - CGAS Kodiak
  - CGAS New Orleans
  - CGAS San Diego
  - CGAS Sitka
  - CGAS Traverse City
  - CGAS Ventura
  - Coast Guard Aviation Training Center

== Accidents ==
As of November 2023, four Jayhawks have been involved in crashes, including two fatal crashes. Four Coast Guardsmen were hospitalized after a crash on 13 November 2023 during a search and rescue mission near Read Island, Alaska.

== Specifications (HH-60J) ==

Most data is for HH-60J with data for MH-60T noted below.

Data from USCG HH-60J information, Sikorsky S-70B Seahawk information, Globalsecurity.org HH-60J specifications

General characteristics

- Crew: four (pilot, co-pilot, two flight crew)
- Length: 64 ft 10 in (19.76 m)
- Wingspan: 53 ft 8 in (16.36 m)
- Height: 17 ft 0 in (5.18 m)
- Empty weight: 14,500 lb (6,580 kg)
- Max takeoff weight: 21,884 lb (9,926 kg)
- Powerplant: 2 × General Electric T700-GE-401C gas turbines, 1,890 shp (1,410 kW) each

Performance

- Maximum speed: 205 mph (333 km/h, 180 kn)
- Cruise speed: 160 mph (260 km/h, 140 kn)
- Range: 802 mi (1,300 km, 700 nmi)
- Service ceiling: 5,000 ft (1,520 m) hovering

Armament

- 1 × 0.308 in (7.62×51 mm) M240H medium machine gun in starboard door (MH-60T)
- 1 × 0.50 in (12.7×99 mm) Barrett M82 semi-automatic rifle (MH-60T)

== See also ==
- U.S. helicopter armament subsystems

Related development

- Sikorsky HH-60 Pave Hawk
- Sikorsky S-70
- Sikorsky S-92
- Sikorsky SH-60 Seahawk
- Sikorsky UH-60 Black Hawk

Aircraft of comparable role, configuration, and era

- Eurocopter HH-65 Dolphin
- MH-68 Stingray
- Changhe Z-8

Related lists

- List of active United States military aircraft
- List of rotorcraft
- List of Sikorsky S-70 Models
