= Amazon Venture oil spill =

1986 environmental disaster in Georgia, US

- Interactive map of Amazon Venture oil spill
- Location: Port of Savannah, near Savannah, Georgia, United States
- Coordinates: 32°7′50″N 81°8′25″W
- Date: December 4–6, 1986

Cause
- Cause: Faulty valves on the MV Amazon Venture oil tanker
- Casualties: 0
- Operator: Calluna Maritime Corporation

Spill characteristics
- Volume: 500,000 US gallons (1,900,000 L)

The Amazon Venture oil spill occurred at the port of Savannah on the Savannah River in the U.S. state of Georgia. The spill, which occurred from December 4 to 6, 1986, was caused by three defective valves in the piping system of the oil tanker MV Amazon Venture, which leaked approximately 500,000 US gallons (1,900,000 liters; roughly 1,800 metric tons or 2,000 short tons) (Note: This mass estimate is calculated from the specific gravity of the type of fuel oil carried by the ship.) of fuel oil into the river.

Authorities at the port were made aware of oil in the river approximately three hours after the ship began offloading its oil, but due to difficulties in locating the source of the spill, the ship was allowed to continue offloading until it completed on December 6. That same day, chemical testing revealed that the ship had been responsible for the spill. While initial estimates categorized the accident as a minor spill involving about 2,000 US gallons (7,600 L) of oil, this value quickly rose over the following days, ultimately becoming classified as a major spill. Officials focused primarily on protecting the Savannah National Wildlife Refuge, a protected area upriver from the port that included a large amount of marshland and served as a habitat for several endangered species. However, due to strong tidal currents, containment booms proved ineffective and about a third of the refuge would be contaminated by oil. Cleanup efforts would continue until being declared officially done on March 13, 1987, with roughly 150,000 US gallons (570,000 L) of oil recovered.

The spill is considered one of the worst environmental disasters in the region, with particular concern regarding the long-term effects of the contamination on the wildlife refuge. The company that operated the tanker agreed to pay $1.2 million in damages to the U.S. federal government and the states of Georgia and South Carolina, while total damage claims from the spill totaled between $7 million and $8 million.

== Background ==
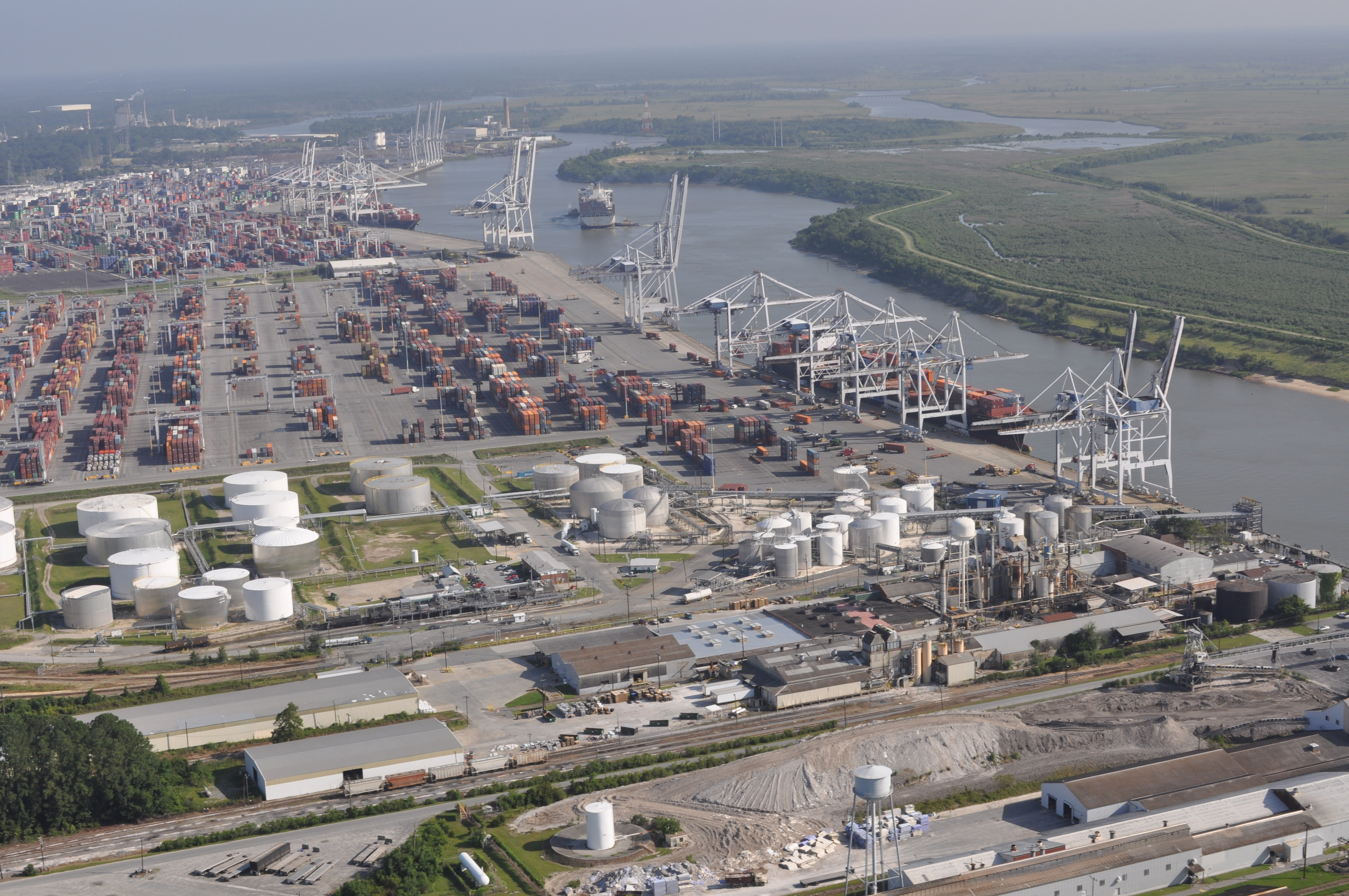
Aerial view of the Garden City Terminal of the Port of Savannah, 2012

The MV Amazon Venture was a tanker that was operated by the Greece-based Calluna Maritime Corporation. The ship was registered in Liberia and had a gross tonnage of 31,683 and a length of 700 feet (210 m). On December 4, 1986, the ship docked at the Garden City Terminal of the Port of Savannah in the U.S. state of Georgia. The tanker had departed from Pointe-à-Pierre, Trinidad and Tobago with a bulk cargo of approximately 13,000,000 US gallons (49,000,000 L) of number 6 fuel oil and was scheduled to unload approximately 3,500,000 US gallons (13,000,000 L) of oil at the port. The terminal was located approximately 25 miles (40 km) upriver from the Atlantic Ocean on the bank of the Savannah River near Savannah, Georgia. Approximately 1 mile (1.6 km) upriver from the terminal was the Savannah National Wildlife Refuge, a protected area along the river that covered about 26,000 acres (11,000 ha). Five endangered species inhabited the refuge: the bald eagle, the peregrine falcon, the red-cockaded woodpecker, the shortnose sturgeon, and the wood stork. At that time, the ship was the only tanker at the port carrying number 6 fuel oil. While docking on December 4, the vessel ran aground, with the port-side bilge keel scraping the bottom of the riverbed.

Prior to the ship's arrival in Savannah, the Amazon Venture had been docked at the Port of New York and New Jersey, where, in mid-November 1986, it was responsible for an oil spill involving approximately 35,000 US gallons (130,000 L) of oil. At the time, the ship was transporting oil to Consolidated Edison, which had had an oil spill about a week prior that was in the process of being cleaned up. As a result, it was not realized at the time that this new spill had occurred, and only later oil sampling confirmed that the Amazon Venture had been responsible for a leak in New York.

== Oil spill ==
=== Detection and response ===
On the night of December 4, 1986, as the Amazon Venture began offloading its cargo, oil began spilling from the ship due to three faulty valves. Approximately 3 hours after this began, the U.S. Customs Service became aware of oil in the river and contacted the Marine Safety Office (MSO) of the U.S. Coast Guard based in Savannah. The Coast Guard was notified at 11:30 p.m. and personnel were present at the scene approximately 30 minutes later. They gave an initial estimate of a minor spill involving 2,000 US gallons (7,600 L), (Note: Several sources reported that the initial estimate was 3,000 US gallons (11,000 L), and that value was stated by U.S. Representative Lindsay Thomas in a hearing conducted by the United States House Committee on Merchant Marine and Fisheries after the spill. However, a report published by the United States Geological Survey gives a value for the initial estimate as 2,000 US gallons, and in the same House Committee hearing, Coast Guard Rear Admiral Howard Thorsen (who was commander at the time of the Coast Guard District 7, which responded to the spill) stated that the initial estimate was 2,000 US gallons.) a figure still large enough that the spill was of federal concern. With this, several federal and state agencies were brought in to assess the situation and oil samples from ships at the dock were collected to be chemically analyzed to see if they matched the oil found in the river. While oil testing such as this would normally have been conducted at the Coast Guard's Central Oil Identification Laboratory in Groton, Connecticut, arrangements were made to have the tests performed in a more timely manner by the South Carolina Department of Health and Environmental Control at their facilities in Columbia, South Carolina. After the discovery of oil in the river, the Amazon Venture was ordered to stop offloading, but after an initial inspection found no evidence of leaking, it began offloading again at 12:40 a.m. on December 5. It would continue until its offloading was completed at 3:18 a.m. on December 6.

At daybreak on December 5, the Coast Guard began to perform surveys on the area of the river near the port to determine the size and scope of the spill. These surveys showed oil contamination along an 8 miles (13 km) section of the river, stretching upriver to the Houlihan Bridge and downriver to the port's East Coast Terminal. The same day that the surveys were being conducted, the Coast Guard set up booms around the terminal to prevent the oil from spreading. Over the following several days, booms were placed near the terminal, in the Savannah National Wildlife Refuge, and along the Wilmington River, which connected to the Savannah River downstream from the spill. However, due to strong tidal currents, the booms were mostly ineffective and contained only a small amount of the oil. (Note: According to Hans Neuhauser, the Coastal Director of the Georgia Conservancy at the time of the spill, booms are generally ineffective at currents greater than 1.3 knots (0.67 m/s), and currents on the Savannah River regularly exceed that speed.) On the evening of December 5, a diver discovered a crack on the hull of the Amazon Venture, though further sounding of the oil tanks did not show water had entered them. However, on the morning of December 6, chemical analysis revealed that the oil had come from the Amazon Venture, though it was still unknown what had caused the oil spill to occur. Later that day, the Coast Guard updated their estimates from 2,000 US gallons (7,600 L) to 11,000 US gallons (42,000 L), which qualified as a medium spill. Around the same time, aerial surveys conducted on a daily basis by the National Oceanic and Atmospheric Administration (NOAA) and the Coast Guard led them to believe that the spill was much larger than previously estimated. As a result, five members of the Coast Guard's Gulf Strike Team in Mobile, Alabama who were trained in managing oil spills were brought in to help with surveying. As a result of the surveys, on December 7, the estimate was updated from 11,000 US gallons to 50,000 US gallons (190,000 L), which still categorized it as a medium spill. (Note: This date of December 7 is given in a report on the oil spill published by the United States Geological Survey, as well as in testimony given by Coast Guard Rear Admiral Howard Thorsen. However, the Associated Press reported that the estimates were updated on December 10.) That evening, the cause of the spill was determined: while offloading the oil, the ship was also pumping oil through its ballast piping system, which was then discharged from the ship's sea chest on its port side. This action was the result of three valves that had all malfunctioned at the same time, and later analyses of these valves revealed that the most likely cause for these failures was a section of 0.5-inch (1.3 cm)-diameter rope measuring between 10 and 15 feet (3.0 and 4.6 m) that had become stuck in the valves and prevented them from seating. This inspection also led investigators to believe that the grounding was not the cause of the spill. As a result of the discovery, the Coast Guard ordered that the three valves be removed and steel plates put in their place to physically prevent flow through that piping system. After this discovery was made, Calluna Maritime accepted responsibility for the spill and subsequent cleanup.

=== Cleanup efforts ===
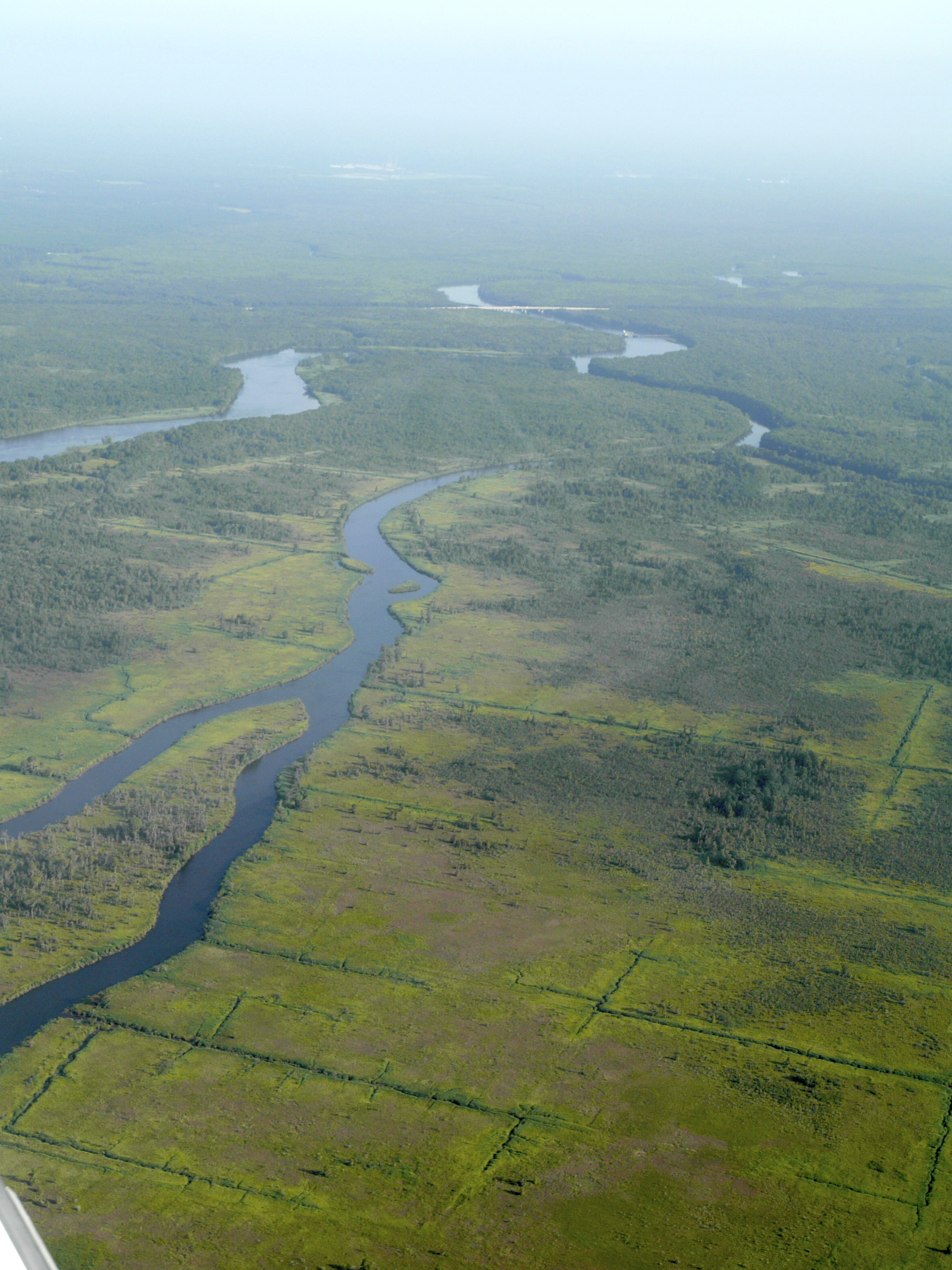
Aerial view of the Savannah National Wildlife Refuge, 2013

On December 9, in an effort to slow the movement of the oil upriver towards the wildlife refuge, the U.S. Army Corps of Engineers temporarily opened tidal gates on the Back River, a channel that was bifurcated from the main channel of the Savannah River. These gates would remain open until December 16 and aided in the cleanup process, which was led by the Coast Guard and involved six private contractors, including two that had been hired directly by Calluna Maritime. (Note: This number of contractors is given in a report published by the United States Geological Survey. However, United Press International reported that Calluna Maritime had hired eight contractors to remove the spilled oil.) Calluna retained the International Tanker Owners Pollution Federation of London to oversee its part of the cleanup efforts, and O'Brien's Oil Pollution Service, Inc. of Gretna, Louisiana was designated as the prime cleanup coordinator. Approximately 60 people were involved in the cleanup, which included the use of 15,000 feet (4,600 m) of containment booms, 6,000 feet (1,800 m) of absorbent booms, and nine vacuum trucks. The wildlife refuge was of significant importance to the cleanup efforts, as two contractors focused exclusively on the area, and 6,500 feet (2,000 m) of the total boom length was deployed in the refuge. This emphasis on the refuge was echoed by John Rousakis, mayor of Savannah, who stated that the refuge might be the area most affected by the spill. Additional focus was placed on Abercorn Creek, due to its water intake. However, the containment efforts were hindered due to both strong tidal currents and the inability to spread the booms across the width of the river. The presence of oil in areas thought to be protected by the booms was confirmed in part by oil found in the meat of shellfish from these areas.

On December 11, the estimate for how much oil had spilled rose from 50,000 to 500,000 US gallons (1,900,000 L), which categorized the incident as a major spill. This followed gauge measurements taken on December 8 that had shown a discrepancy of 500,000 US gallons between the amount of oil that had left the ship and the amount of oil that had been received at the terminal. With the declaration of a major spill, a Regional Response Team was officially mobilized, although many of the constituent agencies that made up the team were already involved in handling the spill. Also on December 11, the Amazon Venture departed from the port after the ship's insurer gave assurances to the Coast Guard that they would pay for the cleanup and posted a $5.2 million bond in a United States district court to cover any civil damage claims. By December 13, approximately 82,280 US gallons (311,500 L) of oil had been removed, though on that same day, a representative for the Coast Guard stated that much of the oil would not be able to be recovered, with the remaining contaminant allowed to dissipate naturally. According to a representative for the Coast Guard, "It's not a situation where the whole river has been covered with oil. It's a situation where you have patches of oil and there'll probably be an oil sheen for a while to come. But with the activity on the river at the port and with dredging, the nature of the river front means you're going to have some oil sheen." In the case of marshlands that had been contaminated with oil, NOAA recommended on allowing the oil to naturally dissipate, as a manual cleanup could have caused additional damage to that environment.

On December 14, United Press International reported that sheen from the oil was present 10 miles (16 km) upriver and 15 miles (24 km) downriver, to the mouth, having been moved that far due to the flow of the river and through the tide. However, at the time there were no reports of fish kills or dead birds, though birds with oil-soaked wings had been spotted in the contaminated area. That same day, cleanup efforts shifted from removing oil from the river to removing contamination that had accumulated on the shoreline. Around this same time, Mayor Rousakis stated that the Georgia Ports Authority had been unprepared to respond to a situation like the spill. By December 17, the Associated Press reported that cleanup efforts had shifted towards the Wassaw Sound near the mouth of the Savannah River at the northern coast of Tybee Island, which was home to large populations of shellfish. Additionally, about 100,000 US gallons (380,000 L) of oil had been recovered by this time, and the Georgia Department of Natural Resources reported that little oil had reached the sound through the three tidal creeks that connected the sound to the river. That same day, it was reported that oil was visible 16 miles (26 km) both up and downriver, but that much of the thick oil globules had been recovered. Cleanup operations continued for the next several weeks, and by December 30, over 200,000 US gallons (760,000 L) of oil-water mixture had been recovered, as well as 160 cubic yards (120 m^{3}) of oil-based debris, such as tarballs. By January 12, 1987, the surface of the Savannah River appeared to be free of any recoverable oil or oil-based debris.

On March 13, the Federal On Scene Coordinator, Coast Guard Captain John E. Shkor (the captain of the port for the United States Coast Guard sector that covered Savannah) officially declared the cleanup complete, finishing approximately two weeks ahead of schedule. The results of the cleanup included the removal of approximately 140,000 US gallons (530,000 L) of oil, (Note: This value was given in a report issued by Coast Guard Rear Admiral Howard Thorsen. However, in the same report, a scientist who had worked with the National Oceanic and Atmospheric Administration gave a slightly different value of 150,000 US gallons (570,000 L).) 200 cubic yards (150 m^{3}) of oil-based debris, and 200,000 US gallons (760,000 L) of oil-water mixture. Of the oil that had not been collected, it was estimated that 50,000 to 100,000 US gallons (190,000 to 380,000 L) naturally evaporated, 150,000 US gallons (570,000 L) was on vegetation near the shore, and 100,000 to 150,000 US gallons (380,000 to 570,000 L) were unaccounted for. An estimated 50,000 US gallons of oil entered the wildlife refuge, of which approximately 200 US gallons (760 L) were recovered.

== Aftermath ==
Following the spill, the Amazon Venture docked at the Port of Jacksonville, where a further 200 US gallons (760 L) of oil spilled from the ship. This occurred despite the three faulty valves on the ship having been removed and replaced with steel plates due to residual oil that had been left in the piping system. Authorities in Jacksonville had been alerted by authorities in Savannah prior to the ship's arrival and had prepared for the possibility of another oil spill, and as a result, the oil was collected shortly after the spill occurred.

The spill was considered one of the worst environmental disasters in the region's history. United Press International called the oil spill "the Georgia coast's worst environmental disaster", while U.S. Representative Lindsay Thomas (who represented Georgia's 1st congressional district, to which Savannah belonged) called it "the worst spill in our state's history". The uncertain long-term effects on the environment, and in particular the wildlife refuge, were of significant concern to many local leaders. Mayor Rousakis stated, "I don't know what the lasting damages will be but I'm sure there will be some damages in marshes and wildlife areas for a few years to come", a sentiment echoed by Hans Neuhauser, a local director of the environmental group Georgia Conservancy, who said, "There is a great deal of concern because we don't know the lasting effects this could have on the area".

In total, the spill contaminated approximately 8,000 acres (3,200 ha) of the Savannah National Wildlife Refuge, including 5,500 acres (2,200 ha) of intertidal wetlands and 1,200 acres (490 ha) of surface water. 58 miles (93 km) of shoreline in the refuge was moderately or heavily contaminated, and a total of 650 acres (260 ha) of marsh was heavily oiled, in addition to 690 acres (280 ha) that were lightly oiled. Additionally, almost the entirety of the Savannah River and its tributaries from the Atlantic Ocean to the crossing of Interstate 95 was contaminated, equating to about 25 miles (40 km). Near the river's mouth, most of Wassaw Sound and Tybee Island were affected, with 124 miles (200 km) of shoreline lightly affected and 60 miles (97 km) moderately to heavily affected. Despite the cleanup efforts, approximately 300,000 US gallons (1,100,000 L) of oil was never recovered. Many areas contaminated by the spill bore a noticeable "bathtub ring" for some time after the accident. Air pollution, which is not commonly observed in oil spills, also increased due to the evaporation of the oil.

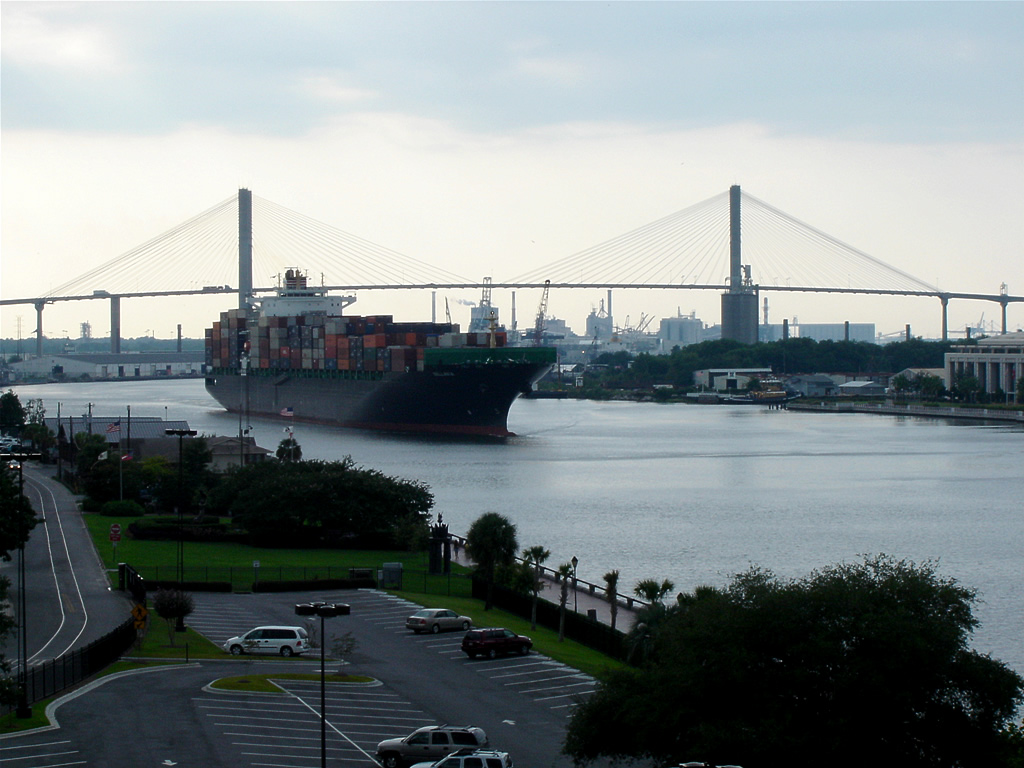
The Savannah River, with River Street to the left

Economically, the spill directly affected tourism in the area, as tourist attractions such as the Fort Pulaski National Monument and River Street reported fewer visitors following the spill. Additionally, hunting and fishing in the refuge was suspended following the spill, with fishing activities resuming 18 days later and waterfowl hunting resuming 12 days later. Approximately 4,000 acres (1,600 ha) of oyster beds, much of which had been closed to fishing for several decades prior, were again closed only one month after they had been opened.

Following the spill, the states of Georgia and South Carolina, as well as the federal government, filed damage claims against the Calluna Maritime Corporation. Additionally, the U.S. Fish and Wildlife Service, the National Marine Fisheries Service, the National Park Service, and the natural resources departments of both states prepared for an assessment on the natural damages done by the spill. However, by early 1987, Calluna Maritime agreed to settle out of court, negating the need for an assessment. The corporation agreed to pay out $1.2 million in damages, with $480,000 going to the federal government, $500,000 going to Georgia, $240,000 to South Carolina. The Fish and Wildlife Service received $386,000 from this settlement. Total damage claims, including those made by the federal government, state governments, and 34 private claims, totaled between $7 million and $8 million. Overall cleanup costs for the spill exceeded $5 million, which was more than the corporation's liability limit under the terms of the Clean Water Act. (Note: Based on the ship's gross tonnage, its liability limit was approximately $4.8 million.)

On April 6, 1987, the United States House Committee on Merchant Marine and Fisheries held a hearing in Savannah pertaining to the spill to gather information on the cause of the spill, how cleanup efforts were handled, and what policy changes could be made to reduce the chances of a similar spill from occurring. The hearing included testimony from several officials who had been involved in both the initial response and cleanup efforts.

== See also ==
- List of oil spills

== Sources ==
- Savannah River Oilspill: Hearing Before the Subcommittee on Oversight and Investigations of the Committee on Merchant Marine and Fisheries, House of Representatives, One Hundredth Congress, First Session. Subcommittee on Oversight and Investigations of the Committee on Merchant Marine and Fisheries, House of Representatives. Washington, D.C.: U.S. Government Printing Office. 1987 [April 6, 1987].
- Stringfield, Whitney J. (1990). "Major Oil Spill on the Savannah River, Georgia and South Carolina, December 1986". National Water Summary 1987—Hydrologic Events and Water Supply and Use. National Water Summary: Hydrologic Events, Selected Water Quality Trends and Ground Water Resources. United States Geological Survey. Washington, D.C.: United States Government Printing Office. pp. 51–54. ISSN 0892-3469.
