= Howard Thorsen =

American Coast Guard officer (1933–2026)

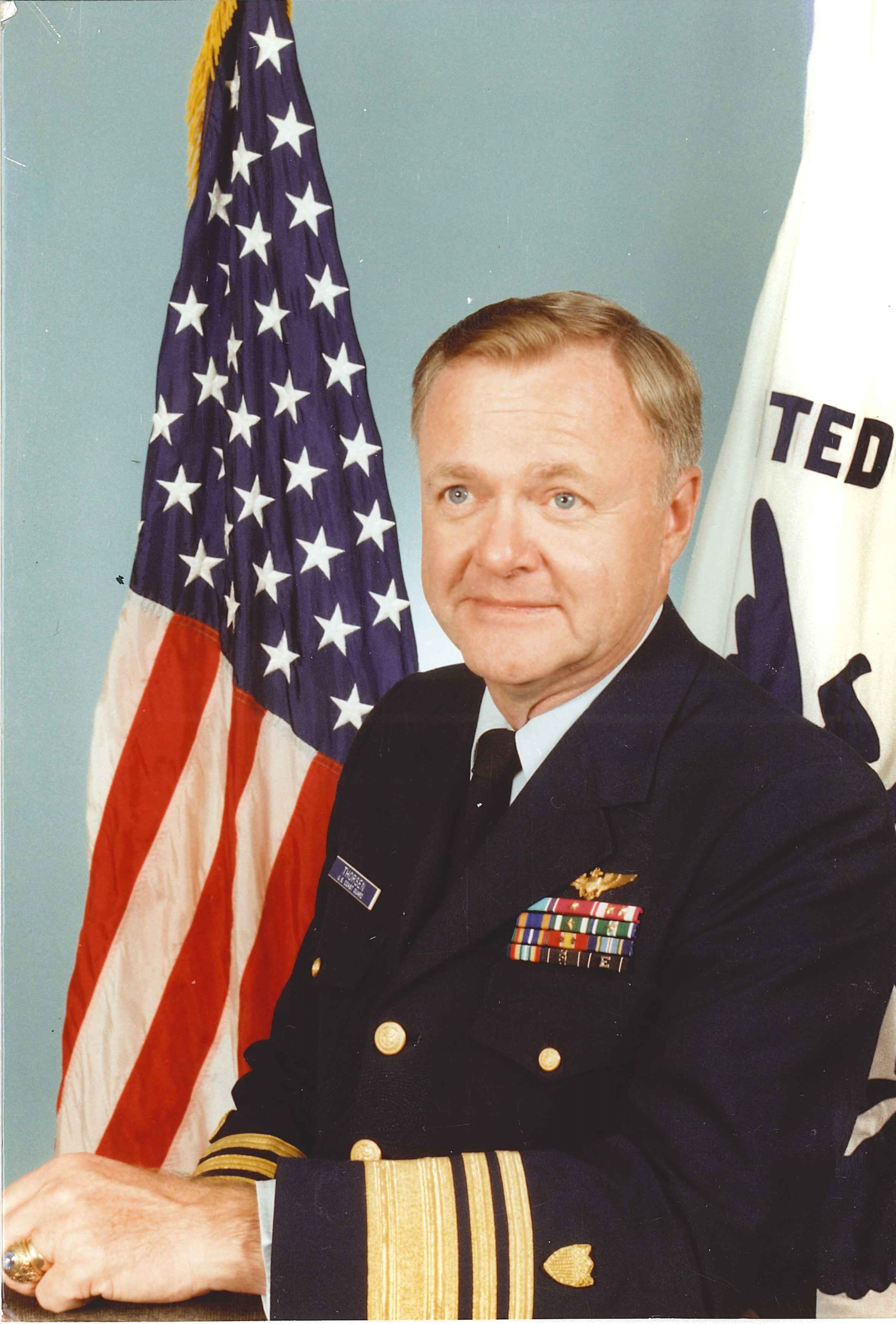
- Born: 1 November 1933; York, North Dakota, United States
- Died: c. 2 September 2026 (aged 92)
- Education: United States Coast Guard Academy; Industrial College of the Armed Forces
- Military career
- Allegiance: United States
- Branch: United States Coast Guard
- Service years: 1955–1991
- Rank: Vice Admiral
- Commands: Coast Guard Atlantic Area; Coast Guard Seventh District; Corps of Cadets, Coast Guard Academy; Coast Guard Air Station Corpus Christi
- Awards: Coast Guard Distinguished Service Medal (2); Legion of Merit (3); Meritorious Service Medal (4)

Howard B. Thorsen (1 November 1933 – c. 2 September 2026) was an American vice admiral of the United States Coast Guard. He graduated from the United States Coast Guard Academy in 1955 and went on to become a Coast Guard aviator. While serving as a helicopter pilot, he accumulated over 4,000 flight hours during his career. His commands included the Coast Guard Air Station Corpus Christi from 1975 to 1976; the Aeronautical Engineering Division at Coast Guard Headquarters from 1977 to 1980; the Corps of Cadets at the Coast Guard Academy from 1980 to 1983; the Coast Guard Seventh District at Miami, Florida, from 1986 to 1988; and the Coast Guard Atlantic Area from 1989 to 1991. After his retirement, he served on the boards of six corporations and published articles for the United States Naval Institute. He died in 2026.

== Early life, family, and education ==
Howard B. Thorsen was born on 1 November 1933 in York, North Dakota, and was raised in Brainerd, Minnesota. He graduated from Washington High School in May 1951 and departed for the United States Coast Guard Academy in New London, Connecticut, the same month. Thorsen received a Bachelor of Science degree and was commissioned in the United States Coast Guard upon graduation in May 1955. He got married on the first day after graduation in 1955, to Marlyn Nitsche of New London, who he met while he was half-way through his time as cadet. They had two daughters.

== Coast Guard career ==
His initial duty assignment was as a deck watch officer on board USCGC Ingham in Norfolk, Virginia, with frequent deployments to ocean station duties in the North Atlantic, and training in Norfolk and Guantanamo Bay, Cuba, during 1955 to 1957. Thorsen next attended United States Navy Flight Training in Pensacola, Florida, and Corpus Christi, Texas, receiving his Navy Wings of Gold in August 1958. His aviation career began with three years in Argentia, Newfoundland, flying search and rescue missions and operating as the aviation component of International Ice Patrol. Subsequent aviation assignments included Air Stations San Diego, Los Angeles, Brooklyn, and Corpus Christi, where he served as Commanding Officer from 1975 to 1976.

Thorsen was Coast Guard Aviator #776, Helo Pilot #442 and Ancient Albatross #13 (longest serving aviator.) He accumulated more than 4,000 flight hours, equally divided between rotary and fixed wing operations. He was recognized as the Outstanding Coast Guard Student Pilot in the Naval Air Training Command for 1958. Thorsen was a distinguished graduate of the Industrial College of the Armed Forces in 1977. Non-flying assignments included serving as Commandant of Cadets at the Coast Guard Academy from 1980 to 1983 and two tours at the Coast Guard Headquarters in the Aeronautical Engineering Division; during the latter of the two (1977 to 1980) as Chief of the Division, he headed a small group of aviators to identify the Service wide replacement for the H-52 Sikorsky short range helicopters, successfully achieved contract approval and ultimately production of 96 Aerospatiale HH-65 Dolphin helicopters.

As a captain, Thorsen was Chief of Staff, 5th Coast Guard District when selected for flag rank in 1984. When promoted, he became the first Coast Guard commodore since World War II when the rank was reinstituted for a short period of time for the Navy and Coast Guard. As commodore and then rear admiral, he was assigned as Chief of Research and Development at Coast Guard Headquarters. In 1986, Thorsen received his second star and was assigned to command the Seventh District, headquartered in Miami, Florida, and also to serve as Southeast Coordinator, National Narcotics Border Interdiction System, with operational responsibility for all Coast Guard activity in the southeastern U.S. and Caribbean area. After two years in Florida, Thorsen was ordered to CGHQ as Chief of Law Enforcement and Defense Operations.

In March 1989, he was promoted to vice admiral and assigned as Commander of the Coast Guard Atlantic Area of the United States Atlantic Maritime Defense Zone (in the Navy) – with responsibility for all Coast Guard operations in the Atlantic, Caribbean, Gulf of Mexico, Great Lakes and Western Rivers; territory east of the Rocky Mountains; plus international activities from the North to South Poles and the Middle East. He was in that post until his retirement from the Coast Guard in 1991.

== Awards and decorations ==
His military awards include: Coast Guard Distinguished Service Medal (two), Legion of Merit (three) Meritorious Service (four), plus the Air Medal for a single-pilot nighttime HH-19G helicopter rescue of two men from an offshore rock formation off the coast of Mexico in 1963.

== Later work ==
After retirement from active duty, Thorsen entered the business world, ultimately serving (consecutively) on the boards of six foreign-owned US corporations) as an outside director. He remained active in issues related to the Coast Guard and Academy, and was co-founder of The Foundation for Coast Guard History. In 2003, Thorsen became a member of The Golden Eagles, an honorary association of 200 Navy, Marine, and Coast Guard aviators. He was inducted into the Coast Guard Aviation Association Hall of Honor in 2020, which he considered his crowning achievement. He published articles for the Proceedings of the United States Naval Institute in the 1990s and early 2000s.

== Death ==
The United States Naval Institute announced Thorsen's death in an X post on 2 September 2026.
