= Helicopter Interdiction Tactical Squadron =

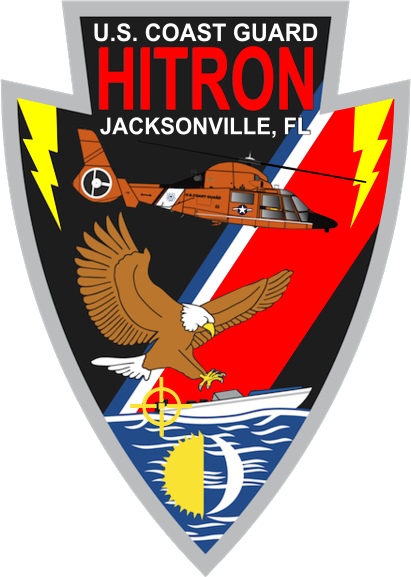
- HITRON insignia
- Active: 1999–Present
- Country: United States
- Branch: United States Coast Guard
- Type: Helicopter Squadron
- Role: Airborne Use of Force
- Nickname: HITRON
- Motto: "Force from above"

Aircraft flown
- Helicopter: MH-65E

The Helicopter Interdiction Tactical Squadron (HITRON) is an armed United States Coast Guard helicopter squadron specializing in Airborne Use of Force (AUF) and drug-interdiction missions. It is based at Cecil Field in Jacksonville, Florida.

HITRON flew armed Agusta MH-68A Stingray helicopters from December 2000 until February 2008. At that time, HITRON took on the mantle of the Atlantic Area Deployment Center, and began flying the MH-65C Dolphin. The unit was formally commissioned in 1999 and as of January 2026 it had interdicted over 1,000 vessels resulting in seizures totalling over US$33.2 billion.

== Operations and tactics ==
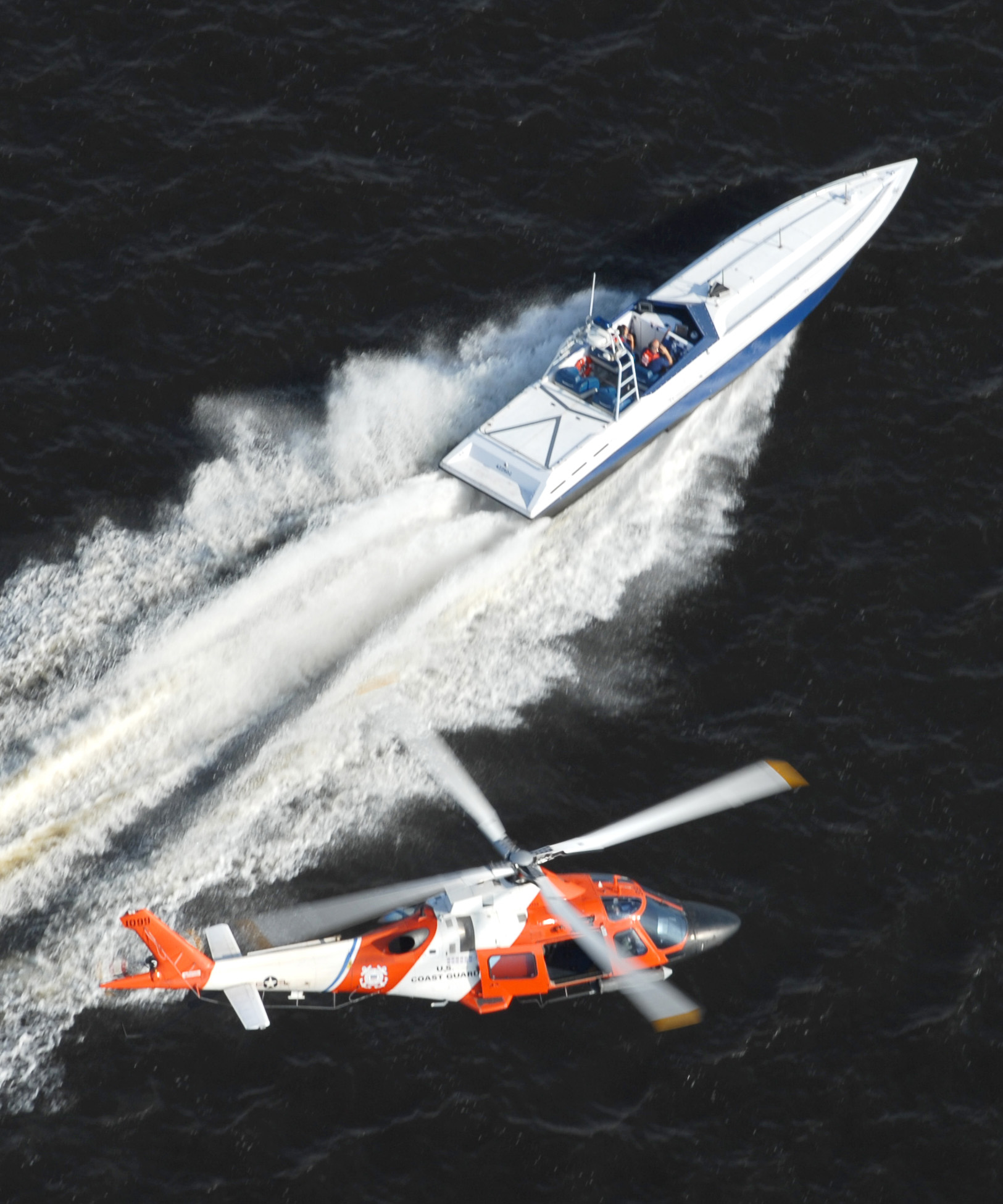
A HITRON MH-68A pursues a go-fast boat during drug interdiction training.

When conducting counter drug operations, HITRON aircrews will deploy aboard Coast Guard cutters for thirty- to sixty-day deployments. While on deployment, go-fast boats are searched for not only by the HITRON helicopter but also by shore based maritime patrol aircraft (MPA) such as the Coast Guard HC-130J Hercules. If an MPA locates a go-fast, the HITRON crew will launch from the cutter to intercept it. The crew will approach the suspect vessel with weapons trained on the vessel for self-protection. The helicopter crew will confirm the nationality or lack of nation status and whether the vessel is in fact a suspect smuggling vessel. The aircrew will then attempt to convince the boat crew to stop through the use of sirens, loud speakers, visual hand signals, and radio communications in both English and Spanish. If the vessel stops during this phase, it will be boarded and searched by a boarding team from the cutter which accompanies the chase in an over-the-horizon pursuit boat and is vectored to the scene by the HITRON crew. If the vessel is found to be carrying drugs, the boarding team will take appropriate law enforcement action.

If the suspect vessel fails to stop after numerous visual and verbal warnings, the helicopter crew will take up a firing position alongside the go-fast and the aerial gunner will fire warning shots across their bow with the mounted M240 machine gun to further compel them to stop. If the warning shots do not convince the suspects to stop, the gunner will attempt to disable the vessel by shooting out its engines with a .50 caliber precision rifle. Go-fasts usually have multiple outboard engines and the gunner will continue to fire into these engines until the suspects stop or they are forced to stop. Once the vessel is stopped, it will be boarded by the over-the-Horizon boat's boarding team.

== History ==
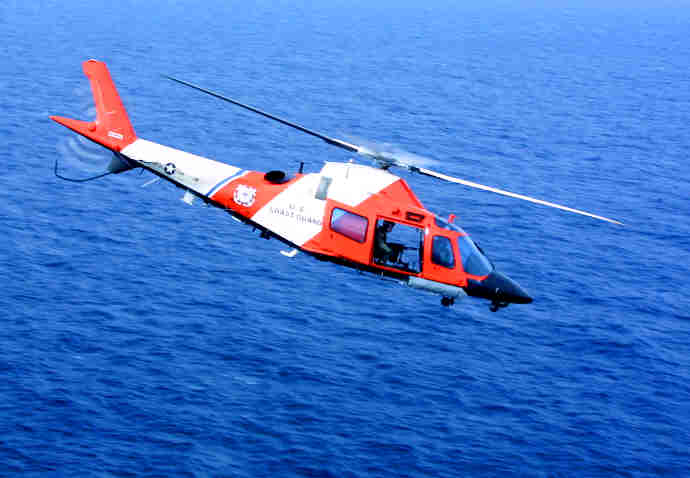
Agusta MH-68A Stingray formerly operated by HITRON

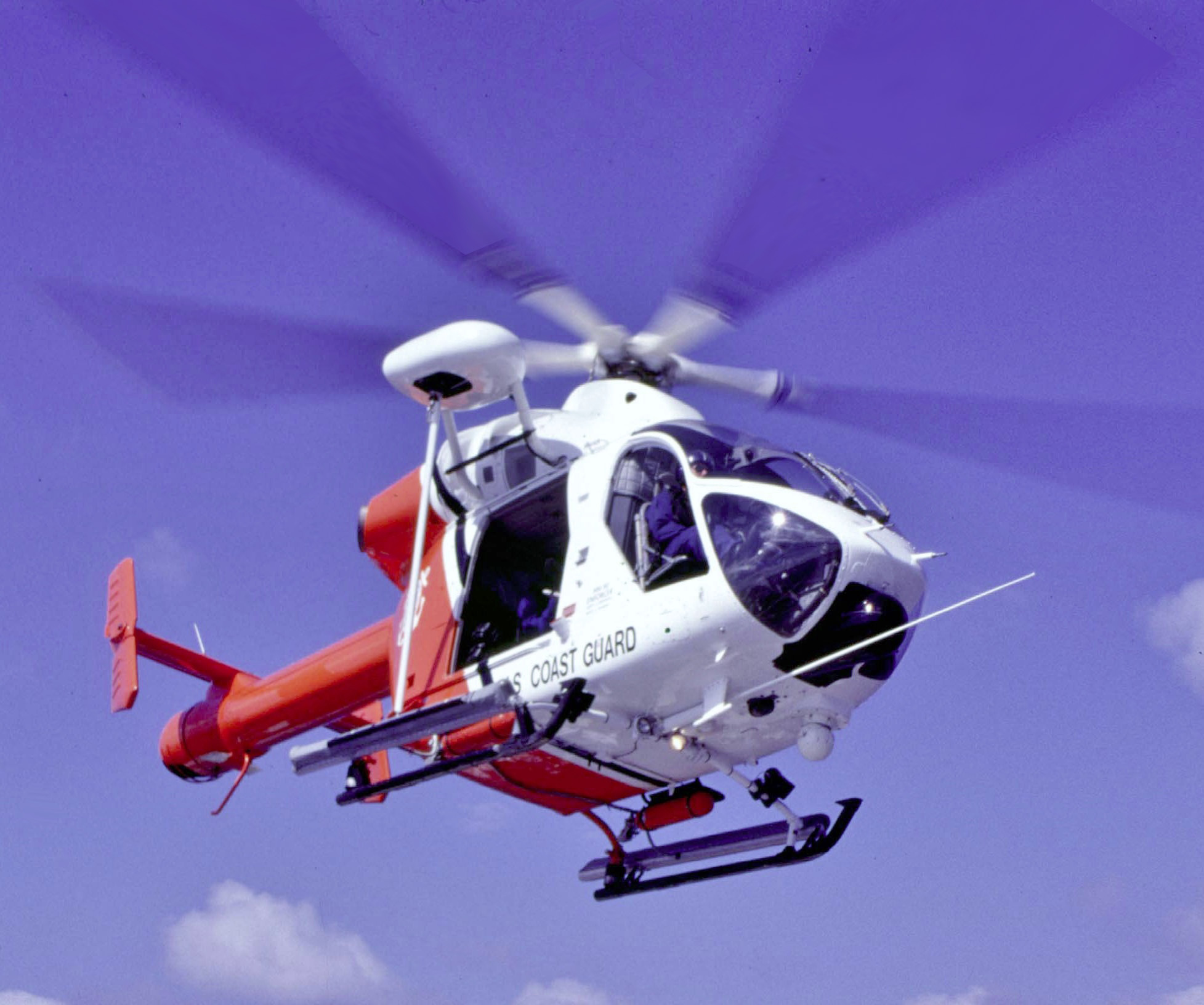
A MH-90 Enforcer flown by HITRON-10 in 1999.

In 1998, the Coast Guard estimated that it was stopping less than ten percent of the illegal drugs entering the United States by sea. Spurred by these estimates, Admiral James Loy, the then Commandant, directed the Coast Guard to develop a plan to counter the go-fast boats used for smuggling drugs.

This gave rise to the HITRON. Starting in late 1998, Commander Mark 'Roscoe' Torres molded a group of ten volunteers into a cohesive and effective team, and in just seven months took ideas to reality as the squadron pioneered novel operating tactics and procedures. Flying leased MD900 and MD902 Enforcer helicopters, the unit developed and evaluated tactics and procedures for day and night operations. Commander Roscoe worked closely with then LtCol Mark Mahaffey, Gunnery Sergeant Webb and Sgt Burkhardt from HMLA-269, a United States Marine Corps helicopter squadron. The Marines worked with the Coast Guard aircrews with weapons employment and aerial tactics, which was instrumental in the Coast Guard Aircrews receiving Naval Aerial Gunner Qualifications. The training culminated in a live shoot in which the gunnery and flight operations worked flawlessly and allowed Coast Guard aircrews to actively engage Go-Fast drug boats with aerial weapons.

During this early proof of concept phase, HITRON-10 intercepted and stopped all five go-fasts they encountered, stopping the entry to the US of2,640 pounds (1,197 kg) of cocaine, and 7,000 pounds (3,175 kg) of marijuana with an estimated street value of over US$100 million, with all 17 suspects arrested. Due to their outstanding success during the test and evaluation stage, the HITRON-10 program was validated and designated a permanent Coast Guard unit, HITRON.

The use of armed helicopters was originally classified but after proof of concept the existence of the unit was revealed in September 1999.

In 2014 the helicopters also operated from HNLMS Holland, a patrol vessel of the Royal Dutch Navy and stationed in the Dutch Antilles.

== Equipment ==
=== Aircraft ===
The unit originally flew leased MD 900 and MD 902 helicopters with the unofficial military designation of MH90 Enforcer. When the decision was made to make the squadron permanent and expand it to eight aircraft, Federal contracting laws required a competitive bid to choose a permanent aircraft for the mission.

In March 2000, Agusta was awarded the contract to provide eight A109E Power helicopters to replace the MH90 Enforcers that HITRON had been successfully flying. The Agusta A109E Power was given the military designation MH-68A Stingray.

In 2008 the Coast Guard allowed the lease for the MH-68As to expire and replaced them with the first of the new MH-65C Dolphins. The MH-65C is an upgraded version of the HH-65B which includes, among other upgrades, new avionics and communications equipment and the ability to carry armament. While not as nimble as the MH-68A, the MH-65C is faster, has greater range and endurance, and provides a smoother ride, therefore allowing more accurate shooting. It also has the logistical advantage of being standardized throughout the Coast Guard.

=== Weapons ===
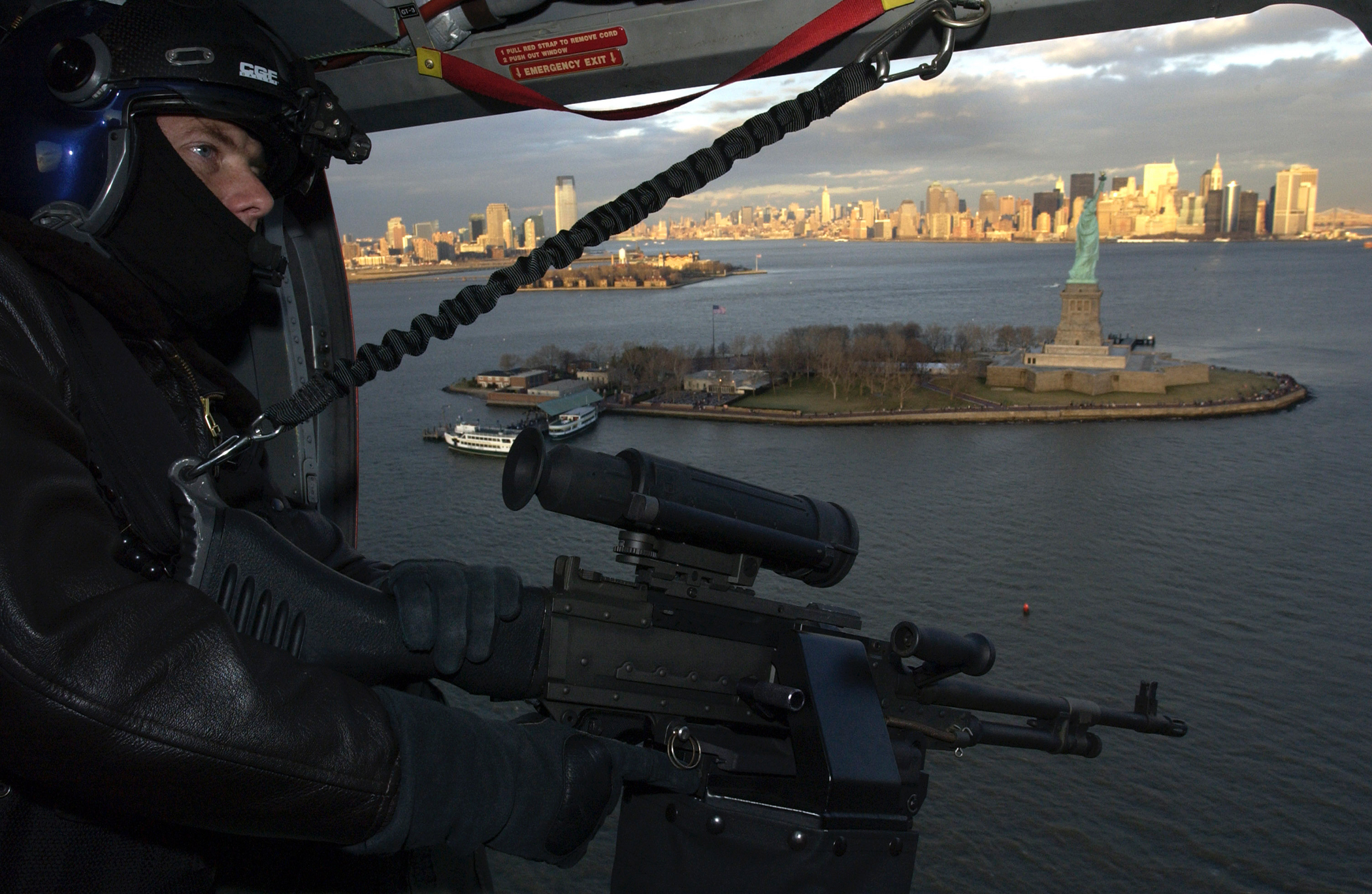
HITRON member from Jacksonville, Fla., mans an M240 machine gun on board a Stingray MH-68A helicopter during a homeland security patrol around New York City

The squadron was originally armed with a mounted M240B machine gun for warning shots and self-protection. The bolt-action Robar RC-50 .50-caliber rifle was used for disabling fire. The RC-50 was equipped with a Trijicon Reflex sight as well as the AN/PEQ-2 laser designator with infrared capability for nighttime operations. The Pilots and Gunners were armed with Beretta M9s for self protection. The RC-50 has been replaced by a variant of the semiautomatic Barrett M107 .50-caliber rifle with an anti-corrosion finish. It is fitted with an EOTech holographic weapon sight and an Insight Technology laser sight. The M14 Tactical, a version of the standard M14 with a Sage Enhanced Battle Rifle stock and improved muzzle brake, is also used by the squadron.

== See also ==
- Law Enforcement Detachments
- Deployable Specialized Forces
- Air and Marine Operations
