= 193 Squadron (Israel) =

Israeli military unit

193rd Squadron IAF
- טייסת 193
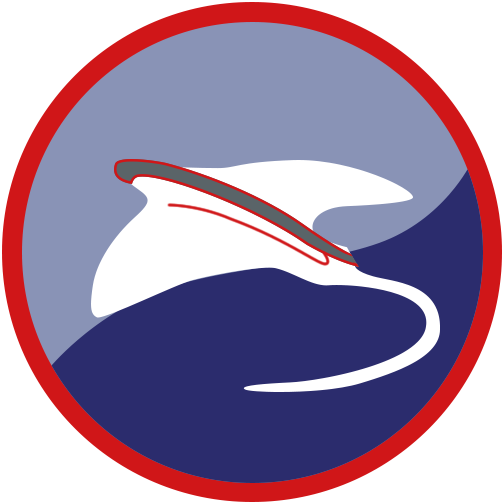
- Logo of the Squadron
- Active: June, 1987 – present
- Country: Israel
- Allegiance: Israel Defense Forces
- Branch: Israeli Air Force
- Type: Naval Aviation
- Role: Performing Aviation services for the Israeli Navy
- Garrison/HQ: Palmachim Base; Ramat David Airbase
- Nickname: Defenders of the West
- Mottos: "In the air, at sea and on land"

Aircraft flown
- Helicopter: Sikorsky SH-60 Seahawk (planned); Eurocopter AS565 Panther (former); Eurocopter HH-65 Dolphin (former)

The 193 Squadron is a squadron of the Israeli Air Force (IAF), also known as the Maritime Helicopters Squadron and operates on behalf of the Israeli Navy.

The squadron previously flew AS565 Panther helicopters.

== Aircraft ==
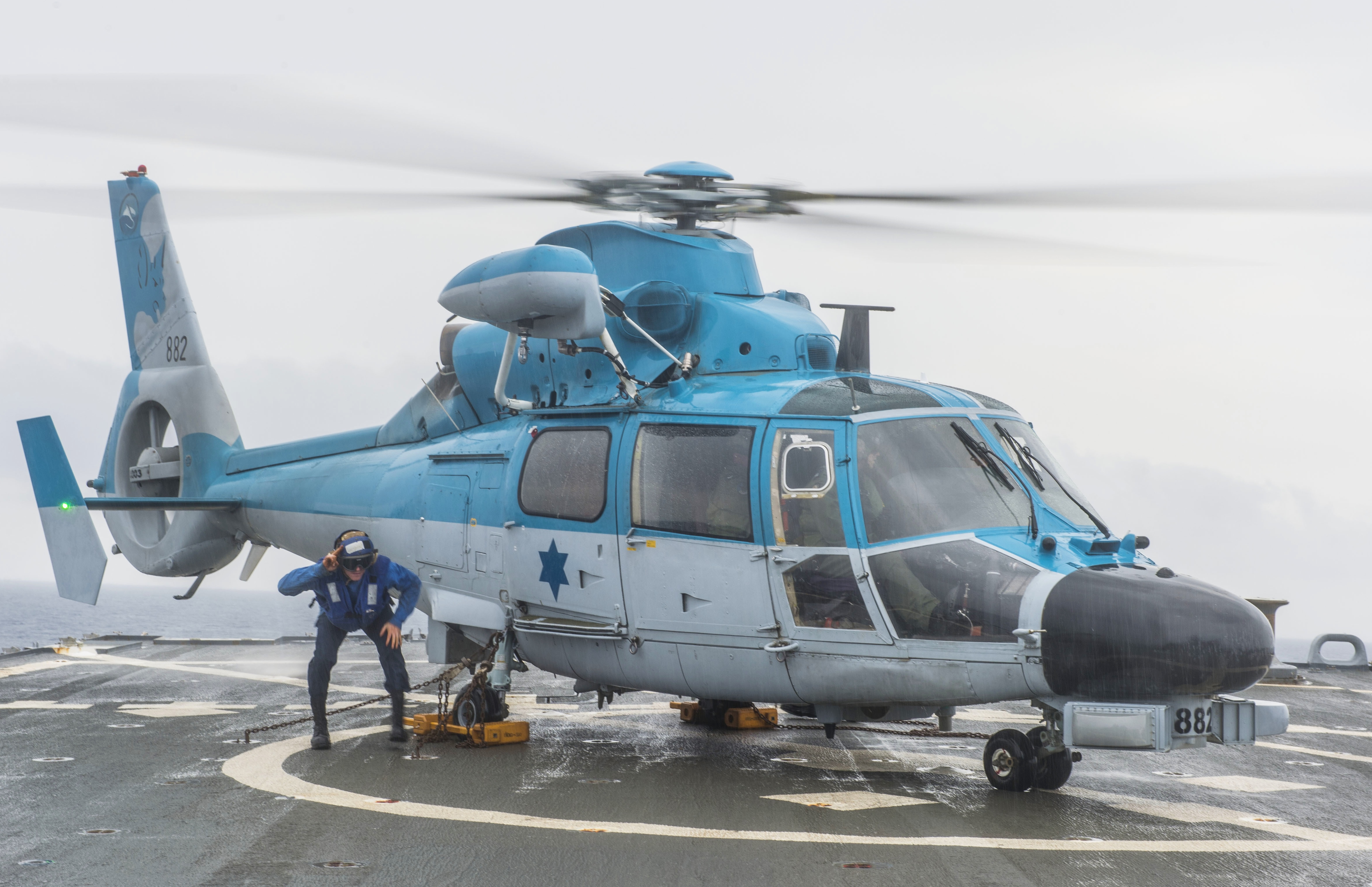
193 Squadron helicopter on a Naval ship

The squadron was established in June 1987, flying the Eurocopter HH-65A Dolphin from Palmachim Airbase. After the loss of one airframe in 1996, the IAF retired the remaining HH-65A in 1997. Both airframes were test airframes from the United States Coast Guard.

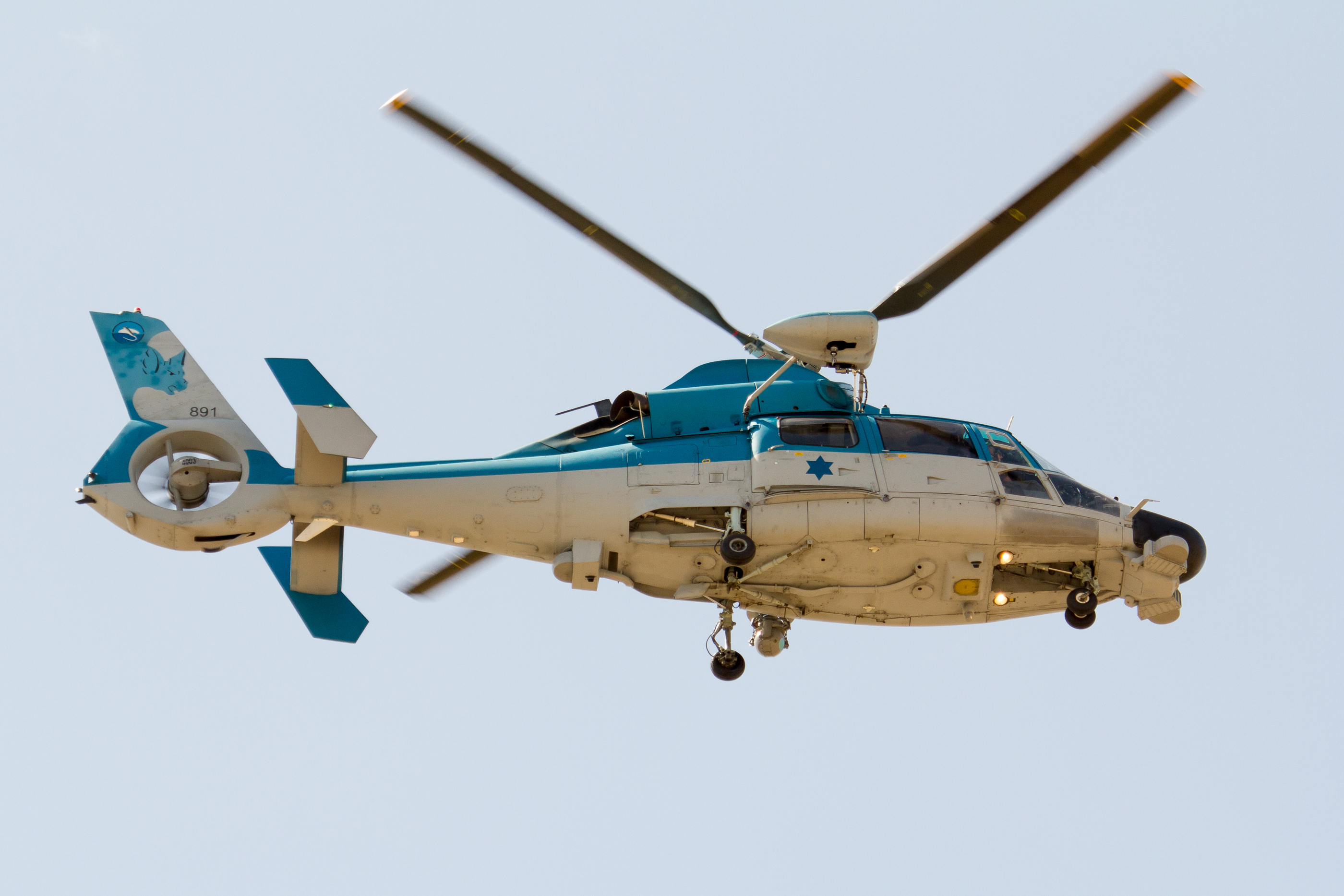
An IAF AS565

The squadron was home to seven AS565 Panther helicopters based at either Ramat David Airbase or Palmachim Airbase. These helicopters are also assigned and can land on the Sa'ar 5-class corvettes and Sa'ar 6-class corvette. The Squadron suffered two fatal crashes, first in September 16th 1996 killing two airmen and a naval officer 1996 Eurocopter HH-65 Israeli Navy Helicopter Crash, second crash took place on January 3rd, 2022 killing two airmen and injuring a naval officer 2022 Israeli Air Force AS565 Panther Helicopter Crash. In 2015 the IAF ordered eight Sikorsky SH-60 Seahawks (US Navy surplus) to replace the Panthers, with delivery expected in 2025.

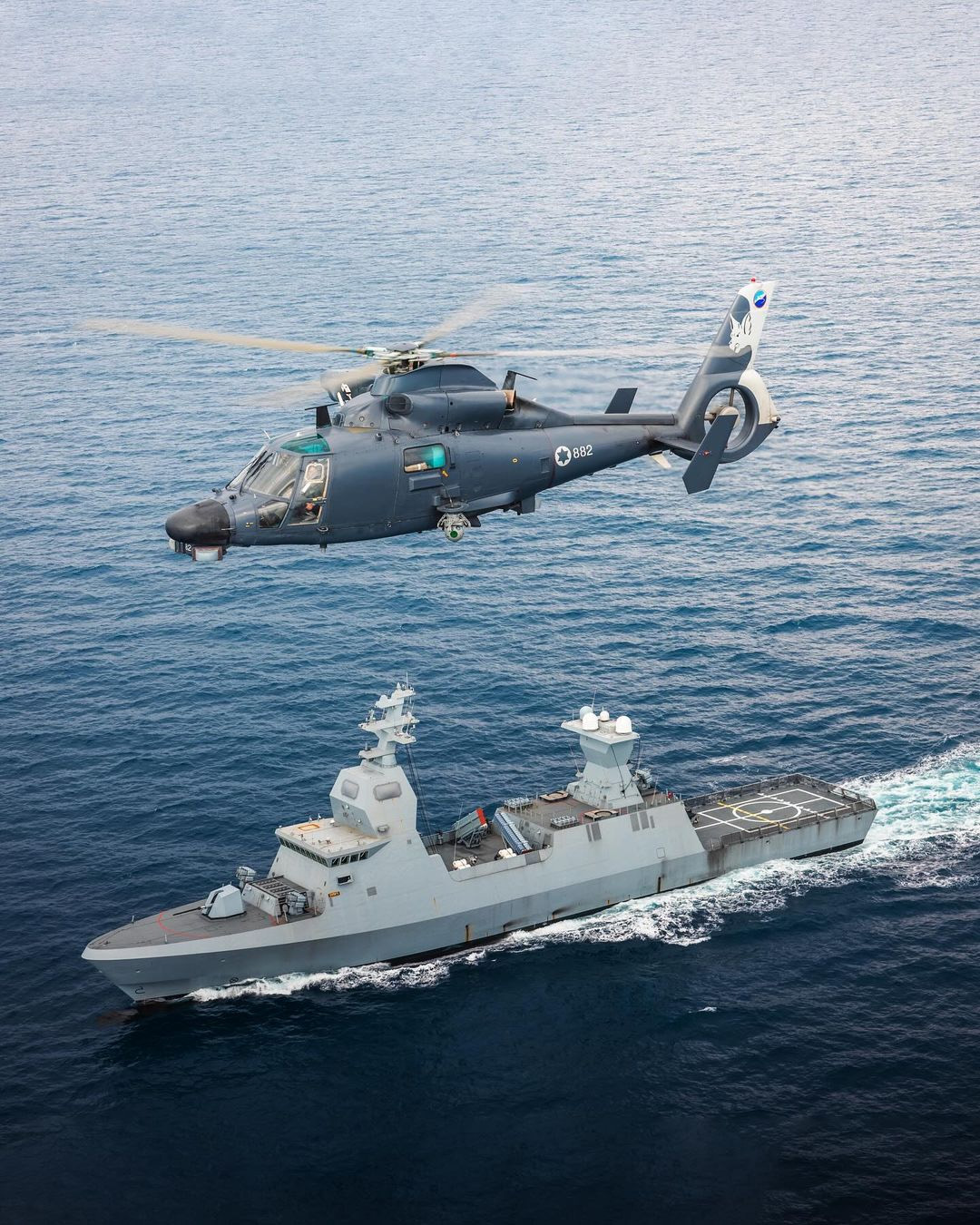
AS565 of the Squadron with Saar 6 corvette

On September 2, 2025 the unit's last 3 AS565MA Atalef helicopters were retired. The AS565's are due to be replaced by SH-60F Seahawks.

== Operations ==
=== Anti Smuggling Operation ===
On May 5, 2001, the squadron took part in the capture of the ship " Santorini " which left northern Lebanon towards the Gaza Strip carrying many weapons intended for the Gaza militants.

On May 21, 2003, the squadron took part in the capture of the ship "Abu Hassan" which was sailing in the Mediterranean Sea on its way from Lebanon to the Gaza Strip . The squadron operated alongside the sea patrol arm in Squadron 120, which operates seagull aircraft, and in cooperation with the Steel Fleet in locating and tracking the ship, and also accompanied Shayetet 13 in the operation to take over the ship, which was carried out successfully. Hezbollah member Hamad Maslam Musabu Hamra was captured on the ship and with him a device Combat and many training materials intended for Palestinians.

=== Second Lebanon War ===
On July 14, 2006, around 8:30 p.m., while operating off the coast of Beirut in the Second Lebanon War, INS Hanit was hit in the rear by a C-802 anti-ship missile launched by Hezbollah . The missile hit a crane in the stern, armed, but did not penetrate the steel crane structure and slipped. A fire broke out in the right section under the helipad, and four soldiers were killed: Major Dov Sternshus, who was in charge of training and an aircraft mechanic in the squadron, and Sgt. Tal Amgar, who served as an avionics technician in the squadron. A "bat" helicopter that was on the airstrip was damaged by the missile and was taken out of the squadron headquarters for repairs. On August 11, 2008, a ceremony was held at the Ramat David Airbase to mark the return of the helicopter, which underwent a series of repairs and tests by the base's maintenance squadron.

== Emblem ==
The squadron's emblem was designed by the graphic artist Orna Shefa, at the request of her brother and the first commander of the squadron, Lt. Col. Moshe Ararat. The emblem she designed beat all the proposals of the Air Force's graphic artists. The emblem shows a " manta ray " type fish whose floating motion in the water represents the combination of Flight and sailing.

== See also ==
- 1996 Eurocopter HH-65 Israeli Navy Helicopter Crash
- 2022 Israeli Air Force AS565 Panther Helicopter Crash
- Israeli Navy
- Israeli Air Force
