= Coast Guard Air Station Savannah =

US Coast Guard base near Savannah, Georgia

Coast Guard Air Station Savannah
- Savannah, Georgia in the United States
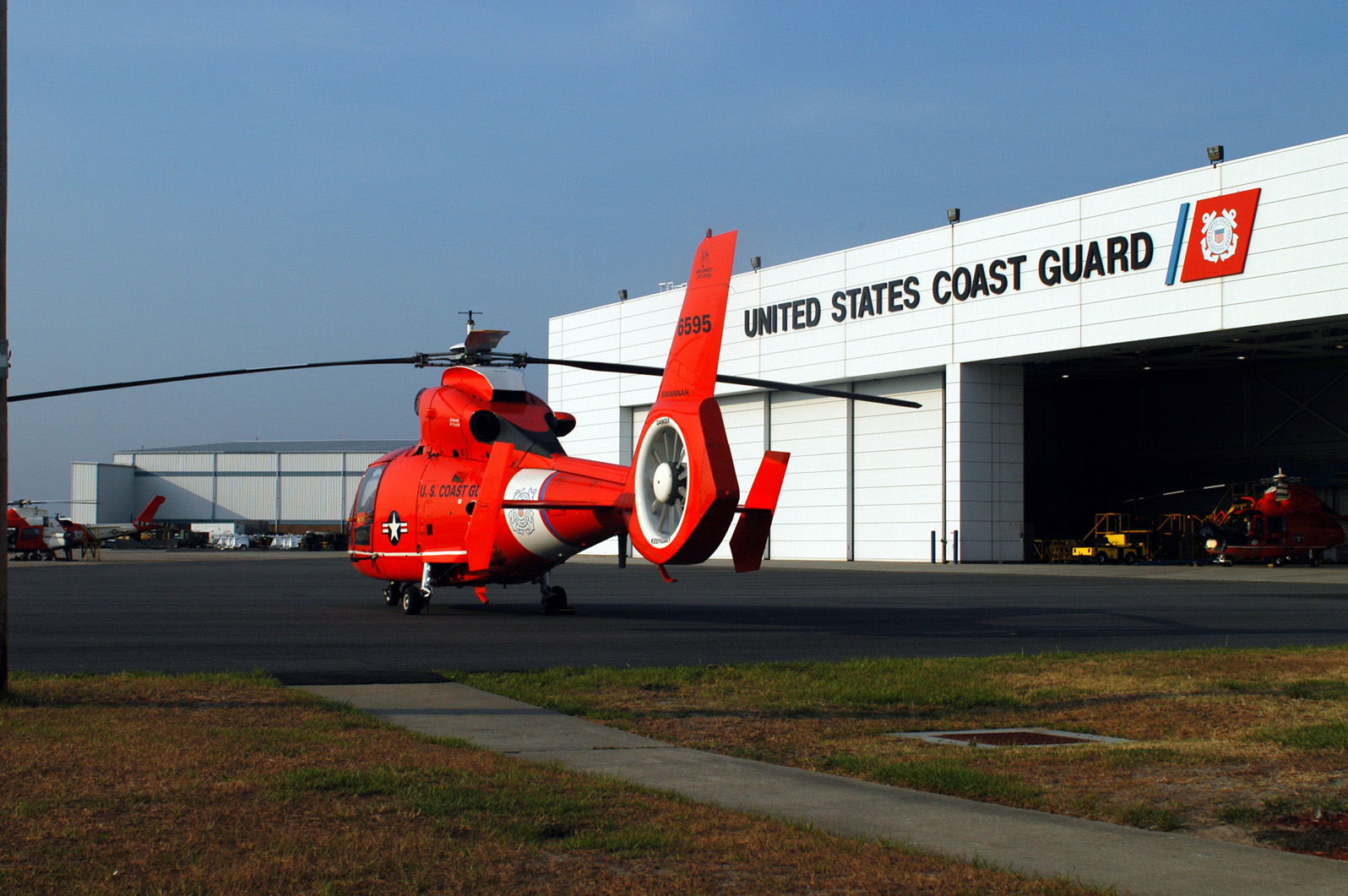
- A MH-65D Dolphin at Coast Guard Air Station Savannah

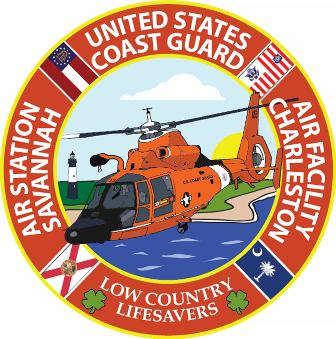

Site information
- Type: Coast Guard Air Station
- Owner: Department of Homeland Security
- Operator: United States Coast Guard
- Controlled by: Seventh District
- Condition: Operational
- Aircraft operated: MH-65 Dolphin
- Website: Official website

Location
- Location in the United States
- Coordinates: 32°01′30″N 81°08′30″W

Site history
- Built: 1963
- In use: 1963 – present

Garrison information
- Current commander: Commander Zachary M. Wiest

Airfield information
- Identifiers: IATA: SVN, ICAO: KSVN, FAA LID: SVN, WMO: 747804
- Elevation: 12.4 metres (41 ft) AMSL
Runways
Direction	Length and surface
10/28	3,467.1 metres (11,375 ft)
- Airfield shared with Hunter Army Airfield; Source: Federal Aviation Administration

Coast Guard Air Station Savannah is a United States Coast Guard Air Station located at Hunter Army Airfield in Savannah, Georgia.

== Operations and missions ==
Coast Guard Air Station (CGAS) Savannah supports a multitude of Coast Guard missions worldwide. Air Station Savannah provides Search & Rescue (SAR) coverage 24 hours a day, 365 days a year, for 450 miles of shoreline from the northern border of South Carolina to Melbourne, Florida, averaging more than 250 SAR cases a year. Other missions include: Marine Safety, Marine Environmental Protection, Fisheries Enforcement, Aids to Navigation support, Migrant Interdiction, Drug Interdiction, Other Law Enforcement and Defense Readiness. Many of these missions require deployment of aviation detachments aboard Coast Guard Cutters.

== History ==
CGAS Savannah was commissioned in the summer of 1963 on what was then known as Hunter Air Force Base, which became Hunter Army Airfield in 1967. In 1964, the Coast Guard's original Sikorsky HH-52A Seaguard Basic Operational Training Unit (BOTU) was established in Savannah. This unit was the forerunner of the Coast Guard's specialized aviator training program now located at the Coast Guard Aviation Training Center in Mobile, Alabama.
