= Coast Guard Aviation Training Center =

U.S. Coast Guard base in Mobile, Alabama

Coast Guard Aviation Training Center Mobile
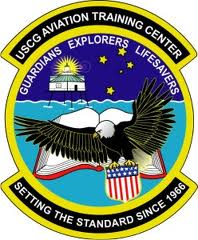
- Aviation Training Center unit patch
- Active: 1966 – present
- Country: United States of America
- Branch: United States Coast Guard
- Type: Air station
- Role: Training
- Size: 550 active personnel

Commanders
- Commanding Officer: CAPT William E. Sasser, Jr

Aircraft flown
- Helicopter: MH-60T, MH-65E
- Patrol: HC-144 Ocean Sentry.

Coast Guard Aviation Training Center Mobile is an air base of the United States Coast Guard located at Mobile, Alabama, where it shares an airfield with the Mobile Regional Airport. The Alabama Army National Guard's 1st Battalion, 131st Aviation Regiment's "B" Company is also located at the airfield. The base is also home to the Coast Guard National Strike Force's Gulf Strike Team.

It is a multi-mission unit, for the Coast Guard's aviation and capabilities development center. Training is conducted to qualify pilots in the MH-60 Jayhawk, MH-65 Dolphin, and HC-144 Ocean Sentry. All pilots initially train at ATC, and will return once a year for a one-week proficiency course in their assigned airframes. Officer cadets from the United States Coast Guard Academy who are pursuing aviation careers also train at ATC. Serving within the Coast Guard's Force Readiness Command's Training Division (FC-T), the center is responsible for certifying all Coast Guard pilots are using their equipment and tactics to meet all mission requirements. The operations department, flies the HC-144B Ocean Sentry, which is a segment within the ATC command that conducts search and rescue, homeland security, and environmental protection missions. The operations department operates under the tactical control of the Eighth Coast Guard District and has an area of responsibility that extends from the Louisiana/Texas border to the eastern edge of the Florida panhandle.

== History ==
In the 1960s, Coast Guard leaders recognized the need for their own "stand alone" aviation training base. Fixed-wing aviation training was conducted at Coast Guard Air Station Biloxi, Mississippi, which was garrisoned at Keesler Air Force Base at the time, using the HU-16 for flight training. The Coast Guard was forced to look at another location after military leaders had thoughts on drastically reducing or eliminating the flight activities at Keesler.

Meanwhile, Coast Guard Air Station Savannah, Georgia, garrisoned at Hunter Air Force Base, was conducting its rotary-wing training with the HH-52. The Coast Guard looked at expanding its training facilities, but this begin to change when the Air Force transferred control of Hunter Air Force Base to the Army (thus becoming the present-day Hunter Army Airfield) and the Army began to conduct helicopter training to supplement the training that was being conducted at Fort Rucker, as well as airborne assault training with units at nearby Fort Stewart; the Army's training began to increase dramatically in preparation for deployment to Southeast Asia related to the Vietnam War and as a result, the amount of adequate space the Coast Guard needed for training became very limited.

The Coast Guard formally commissioned the Aviation Training Center in 1966 on the 232-acre site located at the north end of Mobile Regional Airport (known as Bates Field or Mobile Municipal Airport at that time) that was left vacant when the 908th Tactical Airlift Group of the U.S. Air Force Reserve relocated to Brookley Air Force Base due to budget constraints.

== U.S. Coast Guard aviation training pipeline ==
Normally, it takes about two full years to complete all the requirements to become a USCG aviator. For a Coast Guardsman to be considered for a position, they must first be commissioned, either through Coast Guard Officer Candidate School, the United States Coast Guard Academy, or a college ROTC program. If the applicant is accepted, they are assigned to Pensacola Naval Air Station, Florida, where the Coast Guard Aviation Liaison Officer coordinates their training. This includes academics, physical fitness, medical exams and physicals, and housing. Coast Guard aviation candidates follow an almost identical training pipeline as their United States Naval Aviator brethren from the U.S. Navy and U.S. Marine Corps. Introductory and pre-flight training is taught at Pensacola Naval Air Station, followed by primary training at Naval Air Station Whiting Field in Florida. The training is done in the T-6 Texan II. Aviators assigned to serve on rotary wing aircraft will stay at Whiting Field for advanced rotary wing training on the TH-57 Sea Ranger, while those assigned to serve on fixed wing aircraft will go to Corpus Christi Naval Air Station in Texas to train on the T-44C Pegasus. Once all training is complete, the candidates earn their wings as Coast Guard aviators and will report to their unit. All MH-65, MH-60, and HC-144 training is conducted at ATC Mobile, as well as flight simulator training for the HC-27. However, those assigned to serve on the HC-130 Hercules will report to the Lockheed Martin Hercules Training Center followed by Coast Guard Air Station Elizabeth City for training.

== USCG National Strike Force, Gulf Strike Team ==
The Gulf Strike Team, one of the 3 strike teams that make up the USCG's National Strike Force, is also located at the Aviation Training Center. This specially trained unit was created in 1973 as a result of the Federal Water Pollution Control Act of 1972, and is tasked with responding to natural and man-made pollution and hazard incidents such as oil discharge, hazardous materials released, weapons of mass destruction, and vessel salvage operations. The NSF is part of the USCG's Deployable Specialized Forces (formerly known as the Deployable Operations Group).

The Gulf Strike team can deploy anywhere across the globe, but their primary area of responsibility includes the Coast Guard's 7th District (except Puerto Rico and the United States Virgin Islands), the southern portion of the 8th District, parts of the 5th District, Central and South America, and the Caribbean. The GST also covers the Environmental Protection Agency’s 4th & 6th Districts.

Some of the more high-profile missions the GST has been involved in include responses to hurricanes Katrina, Rita and Ivan; search and recovery efforts in the wake of the Space Shuttle Columbia disaster; the 2010 Haiti earthquake; the 2011 Mississippi River floods; and the explosion and resulting oil spill that occurred with the Deepwater Horizon oil spill disaster.
