= 2022 Israeli Air Force AS565 Panther helicopter crash =

Aviation incident in Israel

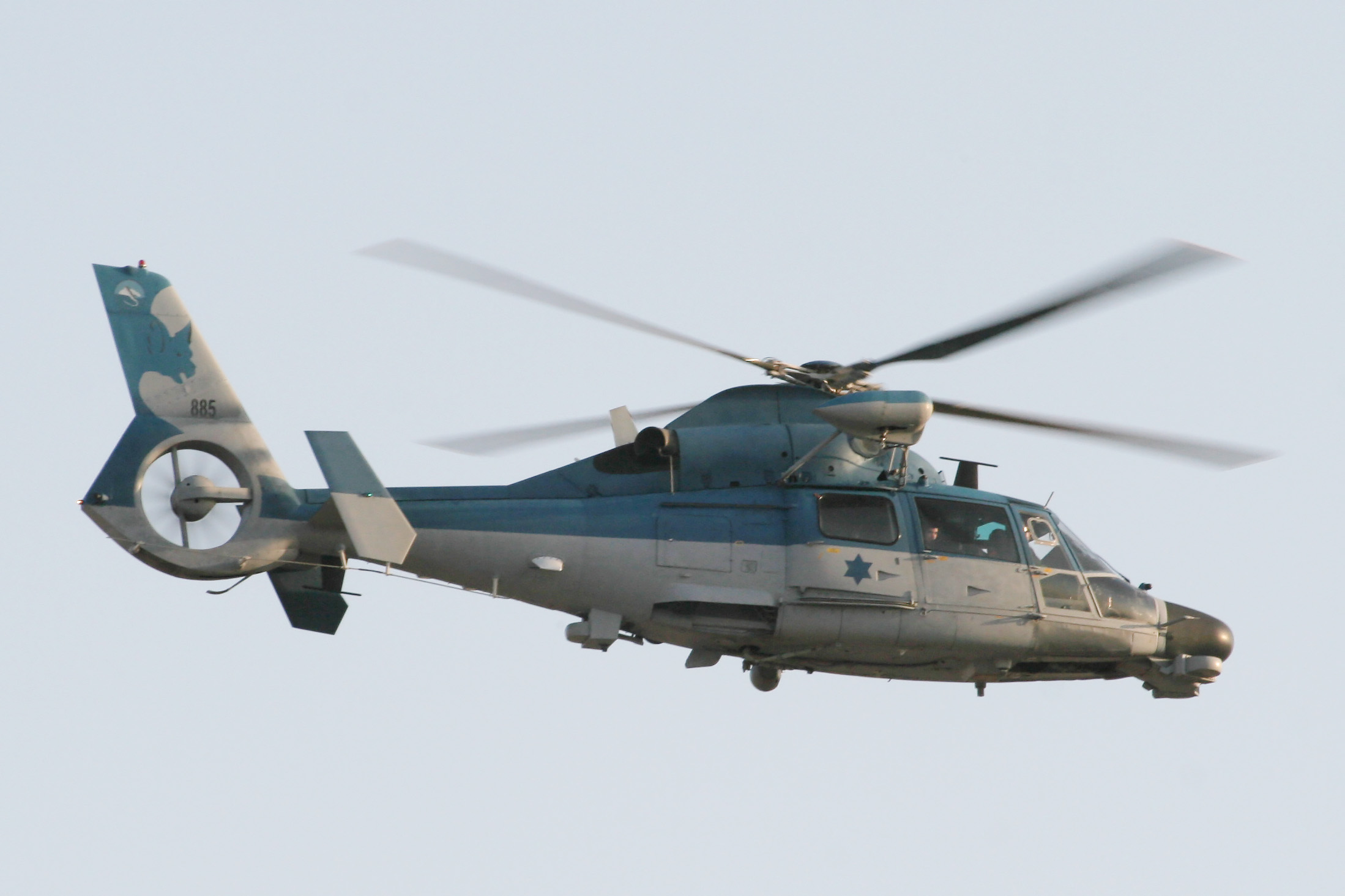
- An AS565 MA Panther from Israeli Air Force, sister aircraft of the one involved.

Accident
- Date: January 3, 2022
- Summary: Engine failure
- Site: Bat Galim

Aircraft
- Aircraft type: AS565 MA Panther
- Aircraft name: Atalef
- Operator: 193 Squadron
- Registration: 895
- Occupants: 3
- Crew: 3
- Fatalities: 2
- Survivors: 1

The 2022 Israeli Air Force AS565 Panther helicopter crash occurred on January 3, 2022, when an AS565 MA Panther (known in the Israeli Air Force as "Atalef") crashed into the Mediterranean Sea off the coast of Bat Galim beach, Haifa, Israel, during a nighttime training exercise. The crash resulted in the deaths of Lt. Col. Erez Sachyani and Maj. Chen Fogel, while a third crew member, Cpt. Ron Birman, survived.

== Background ==
The AS565 Panther, manufactured by Airbus Helicopters, is a twin-engine, multi-role military helicopter widely used by navies around the world. In Israel, it is designated "Atalef" (Hebrew: עטלף, meaning "bat") and is primarily operated by 193 Squadron of the Israeli Air Force (IAF), serving in naval support roles.

== Incident ==
On the night of January 3, 2022, at approximately 21:00 local time, the Atalef helicopter (tail number 895, MSN 6560) was engaged in a routine naval training mission. Approximately one hour into the flight, an engine fire broke out mid-air. Despite the deployment of the helicopter's emergency flotation system, the aircraft crashed into the sea just off Haifa’s Bat Galim beach.

There was no distress signal received prior to impact.

=== Crew ===
- Lt. Col. Erez Sachyani – Pilot (deceased)
- Maj. Chen Fogel – Co-pilot (deceased)
- Cpt. Ron Birman – Naval officer (survived)

== Rescue and recovery ==
Rescue operations by the Israeli Navy, Air Force, and Police began within eight minutes of losing contact with the helicopter. Cpt. Birman, who managed to escape the sinking aircraft, was rescued shortly after and later called his squadron commander to report the incident. The bodies of the two pilots were recovered approximately one hour later.

== Investigation ==
=== Initial findings ===
The Israeli Air Force launched an internal investigation immediately after the crash. The fragments of the aircraft were sent to Airbus Helicopters in France for forensic analysis. An initial interim report was presented to IAF Commander Maj. Gen. Amikam Norkin and to the families of the victims in early February 2022.

=== Cause of the crash ===
The investigation concluded that the cause of the crash was a catastrophic failure of a turbine blade inside the left engine, caused by internal corrosion that had gone undetected. The fractured blade triggered a fire that subsequently affected the right engine and filled the cabin with smoke.

Due to the deep internal location of the corroded component, the part is not included in routine maintenance and is only checked during comprehensive overhauls every 1,650 flight hours. The helicopter had been inspected in 2017 and had flown fewer than 1,400 hours since then.

According to IAF Brig. Gen. Amir Lazar, Airbus Helicopters indicated this was the first known global incident of its kind.

=== Sequence of events ===
- The crew identified the malfunction and attempted to fight the fire using the onboard fire suppression system.
- However, they did not shut down the engines prior to activating the fire system, reducing its effectiveness.
- The helicopter crashed into the sea within two minutes of the fire starting.
- The force of the impact knocked the pilots unconscious or severely disoriented them, preventing them from unbuckling or using oxygen tanks.
- The right flotation device exploded upon impact, and the helicopter began to sink rapidly.

The cause of death for both pilots was determined to be drowning. No signs were found indicating any escape attempt.

== Aftermath ==
Following the incident:

- The entire fleet of AS565 Panther helicopters was grounded.
- Each helicopter underwent detailed inspection for similar signs of internal corrosion.
- The helicopters were scheduled to gradually return to service upon clearance.

=== Statements ===
IAF Commander Maj. Gen. Norkin described the crash as "a very fast, very violent, very irregular incident" and emphasized the experience and professionalism of the fallen pilots. He added:

"We will continue to learn, improve, and do as much as possible to prevent a recurrence of such an accident."

Brig. Gen. Lazar reaffirmed the IAF's confidence in the Atalef helicopter, calling it a "reliable vehicle" despite the rare mechanical failure.

== Aircraft information ==
- Type: Eurocopter AS565 MA Panther (AS365N3)
- Role: Naval support, anti-submarine warfare
- Operator: Israeli Air Force (193 Squadron)
- Registration: 895
- Flight Hours since Last Full Inspection: ~1,400
- Last Manufacturer Inspection: 2017

== Legacy ==
The deaths of Sachyani and Fogel marked a significant loss for the Israeli Air Force. Both were senior commanders with extensive flight experience, having contributed greatly to Israeli military operations. The event prompted cross-continental investigations and collaboration with Airbus Helicopters to improve maintenance procedures and inspection protocols.

== See also ==
- Israeli Air Force
- Israeli Navy
- Aviation accidents and incidents
- Eurocopter AS 365 Dauphin
