= Coast Guard Air Station Corpus Christi =

US Coast Guard base in Corpus Christi, Texas

Coast Guard Air Station Corpus Christi
- Corpus Christi, Texas in the United States
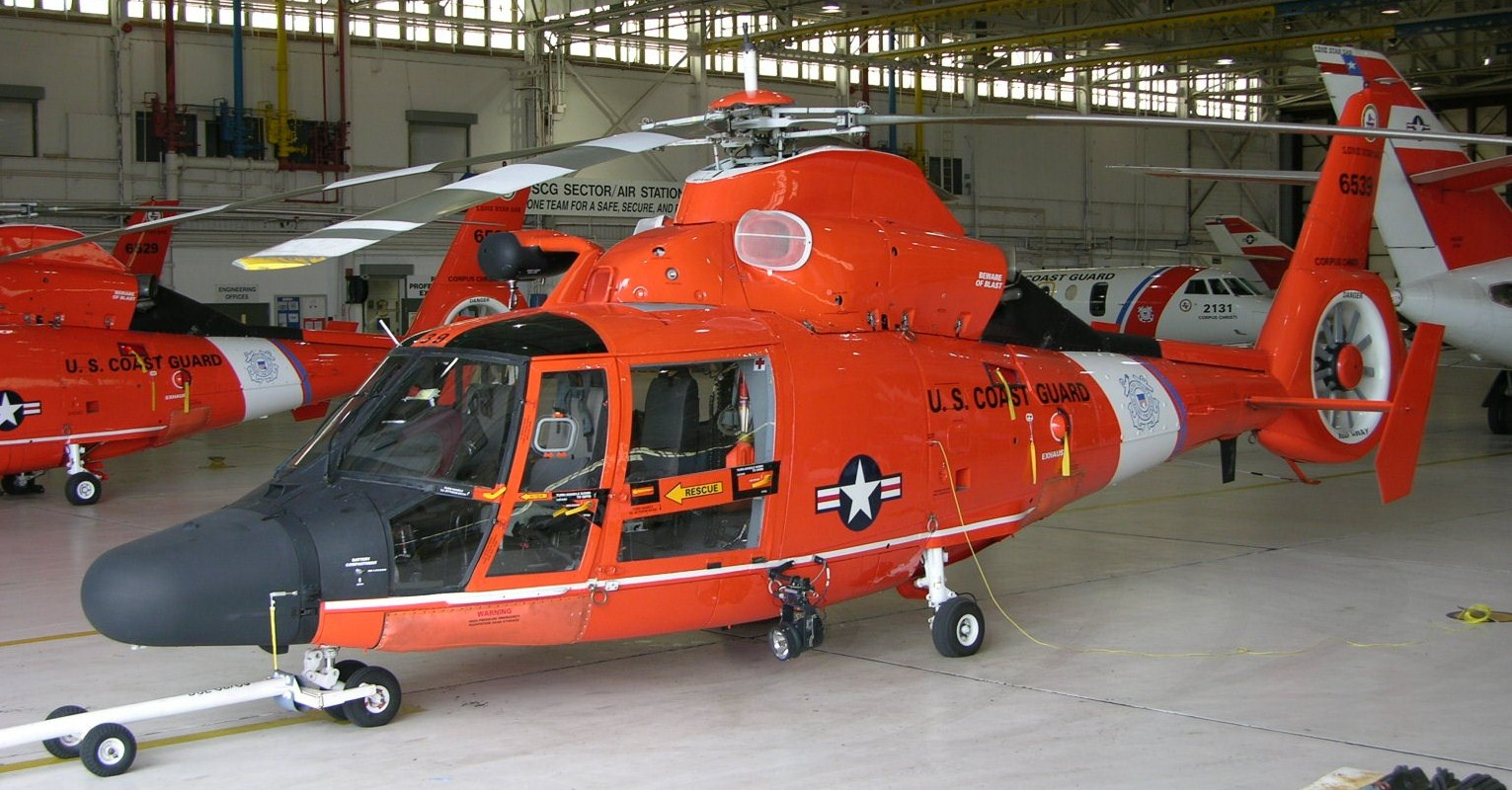
- A US Coast Guard MH-65C Dolphin at CGAS Corpus Christi

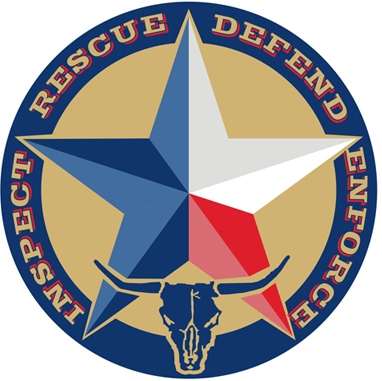

Site information
- Type: Coast Guard Air Station
- Owner: Department of Homeland Security
- Operator: United States Coast Guard
- Controlled by: Eighth District
- Condition: Operational
- Aircraft operated: MH-65 Dolphin; HC-144 Ocean Sentry
- Website: Official website

Location
- Location in the United States
- Coordinates: 27°46′52″N 97°30′33.5″W

Site history
- Built: 1950 (as Air Detachment)
- In use: 1950 – present

Garrison information
- Current commander: Captain Charles Wilson

Airfield information
- Identifiers: IATA: CRP, ICAO: KCRP, FAA LID: CRP, WMO: 722510
- Elevation: 14 metres (46 ft) AMSL
Runways
Direction	Length and surface
13/31	2,289 metres (7,510 ft) Asphalt
18/36	1,853.1 metres (6,080 ft) Asphalt
- Airfield shared with Corpus Christi International Airport; Source: Federal Aviation Administration

Coast Guard Air Station Corpus Christi (CGAS Corpus Christi) is an Air Station of the United States Coast Guard located in Corpus Christi, Texas. The Air Station is co-located with Sector Corpus Christi offices at Corpus Christi International Airport .

The Coast Guard Air Detachment was established on 20 November 1950, and served the entire western Gulf of Mexico with one PBY-5 Catalina fixed wing aircraft, and four pilots. In 1965, the detachment was formally designated USCG Air Station Corpus Christi. Early aircraft consisted of HU-16E Albatross, HH-52A Seaguard helicopter, HC-131 Samaritan, and HU-25A fanjets.

Following extensive personnel and equipment changes in the operations department, the Air Station became fully operational on October 15, 1980, and operated as one of thirteen Coast Guard Group units between Port O'Connor, Texas and the Mexican border. The Air Station maintained a 24-hour Search and rescue capability, with the use of three HH-52A helicopters and three HU-25A fanjets.

The unit averages over 400 rescues a year, which included searches for overdue vessels, assisting sinking or disabled boats, and medical evacuations from offshore oil rigs. In the spring of 1986 the station's HH-52s were replaced with the Aérospatiale HH-65 Dolphin helicopter.

Currently, Air Station Corpus Christi operates the MH-65E Dolphin short-range recovery helicopter and the HC-144B Ocean Sentry medium-range surveillance aircraft.
