= Abercorn Creek =

Stream in Georgia, U.S.

Coordinates: 32°14′54″N 81°09′12″W

Abercorn Creek is a stream in the U.S. state of Georgia. It is a tributary to the Savannah River.

Abercorn Creek took its name from the now-extinct 18th-century settlement of Abercorn, which in turn was named after the Duke of Abercorn.
