= Georgia Conservancy =

American non-profit environmental group

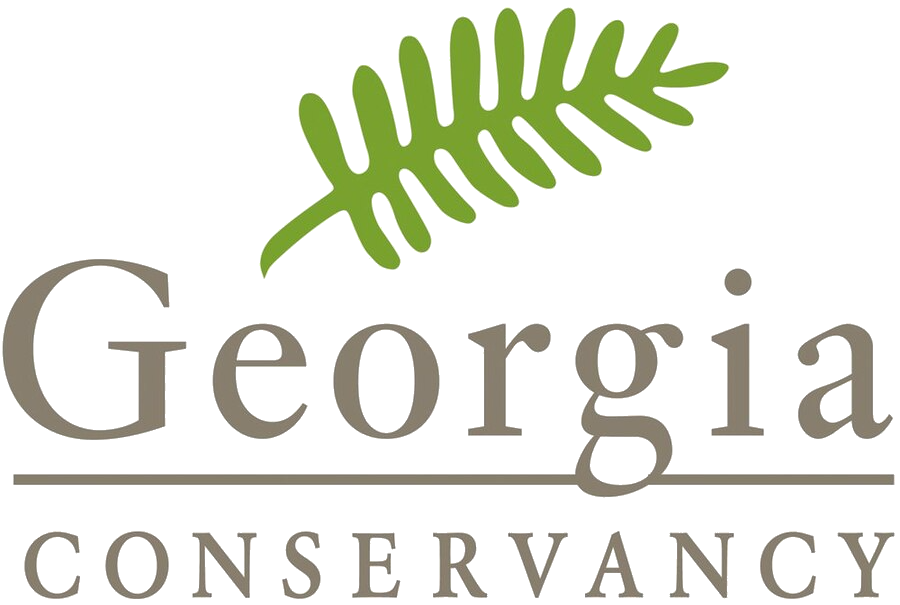
- Formation: 1967; 59 years ago
- Founder: James MacKay
- Type: Nonprofit
- Tax ID no.: 58-1027246
- Legal status: 501(c)(3)
- Purpose: Advocacy, land Conservation, sustainable growth, coastal issues, stewardship trips
- Headquarters: Atlanta, Georgia
- Region served: Georgia
- Board Chair: Virginia Harman
- President: Katherine Moore
- Website: georgiaconservancy.org

The Georgia Conservancy is an American non-profit environmental organization in the U.S. state of Georgia that collaborates, advocates, and educates to protect Georgia's natural environment. It was founded in 1967. Called "the state's most influential environmental organization" by Georgia Trend magazine, the Georgia Conservancy focuses on environmental advocacy, land conservation, coastal protection, stream protection, outdoor recreation, stewardship, and growth management. Its mission is: “To protect Georgia's natural resources for present and future generations by advocating sound environmental policies, advancing sustainable growth practices and facilitating common-ground solutions to environmental challenges.”

The Georgia Conservancy's main office is in Midtown Atlanta. The group also has an office in Savannah, Georgia that focuses on issues affecting the Georgia coast. The group offers stewardship trips and has released guidebooks.

== Early years ==
The Georgia Conservancy was founded in 1967 after James MacKay, a former U.S. congressman from Decatur, Georgia, gathered a group of Georgians to discuss ways to protect the state's natural resources. The organization was created as a non-partisan body “organized specifically to promote fellowship and good fun among its members”. The group's earliest conservation efforts were largely focused on protecting endangered places around the state.

By 1968, the Conservancy had already begun to influence conservation and planning decisions along Georgia's coasts.

Concerned by the link that had been established between automobile emissions and air pollution, leaders within the organization began calling for metro Atlanta to work on its public transit system in 1971.

In 1974, The Conservancy celebrated a landmark decision by the Georgia Supreme Court in the “beach case,” Georgia v. Ashmore, decided in favor of the state and granting it the authority to protect marshes and tidal rivers and guaranteeing public access to all of Georgia's beaches.

Also in 1974, the group helped to get the Chattooga River designated as a Wild and Scenic river. The area would later be featured in the hit film Deliverance.

Working collaboratively with other groups, both from Georgia and across the nation, The Georgia Conservancy was able to protect four key nature areas around the state only a few years after its foundation.

- Sweetwater Creek became a Georgia State Park in 1972 as Sweetwater Creek State Park.
- Congress designated Cumberland Island as a national seashore in 1972.
- The entirety of The Okefenokee Swamp that was located in Georgia was designated as the Okefenokee Wilderness after the passing of Public Law 93-429, a section from the Wilderness Act of 1974.
- The area surrounding Panola Mountain, just outside of metro Atlanta, was designated as a state park in 1980.

In 1976, Conservancy champion and charter member Jimmy Carter was elected as president of the United States.

In the latter part of the 1970s, the Conservancy utilized advocacy as a means of maximizing its statewide, and, in some cases, national, environmental impact. During the period, the Conservancy's efforts remained focused on Georgia's waterways, including its rivers, creeks and lakes, but also on Georgia's barrier islands and coastal communities.

In 2018 the group supported an amendment that would dedicate funds to conservation.

== Growth in the 1980s and 1990s ==
Working with other organizations across Georgia and the U.S. during the 1980s and 1990s, the Conservancy pushed for increased support for threatened species along the coast, greater wetlands protection, the reauthorization of the Clean Air Act, the creation of the Georgia Superfund program, and an environmentally-friendly 1996 summer Olympic Games in Atlanta.

In 1993, the Conservancy launched “Green Peaches” (known today as Generation Green), an organization for environmentally conscious young professionals.

In 1996, The Georgia Conservancy launched its website georgiaconservancy.org. It is still the organization's current web address.

The Conservancy's sustainable growth efforts launched in 1998 as part of Smart Growth conference hosted along with the EPA, Urban Land Institute, and the Successful Communities Partners.

== Present day ==
The Georgia Conservancy remains focused on advocacy, land conservation, sustainable growth, coastal protection, and stewardship trips.

=== Advocacy ===
The Conservancy's advocacy team has decades of experience in state politics and is dedicated to using the political process to help work year-round on key issues such as water resources, habitat protection and land conservation.

The group's advocacy program has scored some key successes: The Conservancy was part of the team that worked with then-governor Sonny Perdue and the state Legislature during the 2010 General Assembly to craft and pass the nation's most progressive water conservation law.

In 2012, the advocacy team helped to facilitate the permanent protection of Boyle's Island on the Altamaha River.

=== Land conservation ===
The Georgia Conservancy's land conservation program was launched in 2011. The Conservancy believes that land conservation is a key to protecting Georgia's water resources, its plants and animals, and its citizens.

The Georgia Conservancy advocates for local, state and federal policies that encourage land conservation. The advocacy team meets with public officials and their staff at all levels of government to secure their support, or to thank them for their support of land conservation funding and legislation.

The Georgia Conservancy also works with landowners to encourage them to place their land in permanent protection through conservation easements or through participation in various other state and federal programs that provide financial incentives for land protection.

In 2018, Georgia Conservancy worked with officials from Milton, Georgia to prioritize conservation lands including a 109-acre tract set to be protected.

=== Sustainable growth ===
The Georgia Conservancy's Sustainable Growth program works to foster smart, sustainable development across Georgia. The team uses four different programs to accomplish this

Blueprints for Sustainable Communities, a program designed to steer cities toward thoughtful land use decisions with regards for both economic interests and preserving the environment. Currently, Blueprints is focused on a multi-year study of sea-rise on Georgia's coast. Blueprints will celebrate its 20th year in 2015.

Good Urbanism seminars teach planning professionals, government officials and neighborhood residents about the importance of sustainable growth.

School Siting workshops bring together diverse stakeholders to learn more about the EPA's guidelines for school siting.

Bantam Towns In The Deep South is an ongoing research project that looks at the hundreds of tiny, rural towns scattered across the Deep South for answers on how they might they be reinvigorated with new economic purpose.

=== Coastal protection ===
The Georgia Conservancy maintains an office in historic downtown Savannah, headed by Coastal Director Charles McMillan, and is working on a range of projects to protect the nearly 100 miles of coastline throughout the state.

The organization partnered with the University of Georgia's River Basin Center and the Coastal Resources Division of the Georgia Department of Natural Resources on a three-year study of the impacts of sea level rise on coastal Georgia.

The Georgia Conservancy is a member of the Coastal Georgia Land Conservation Initiative (CGLCI), which works with public and private interests to conserve critical coastal lands and healthy ecosystems while promoting sustainable economic growth and development.

=== Stewardship trips ===
Since 1967, the Georgia Conservancy has been guiding trips across the state that highlight Georgia's natural resources and provide the public with the opportunity to advocate for their protection.

The group uses its network of partners and peers to provide public access to barrier islands, river systems and nature preserves that are normally inaccessible or off-limits to the public.

What started out as six trips per year for a handful of Conservancy members has grown into a program that now serves hundreds of people each weekend, many from communities of color that have historically not been included in outdoor recreation opportunities.

In 2019, The Georgia Conservancy will host more than two dozen stewardship trips and events throughout the state.

The trips involve a mixture of service and sightseeing. For the most part, the Conservancy's trips last no more than three days, and are usually on weekends. Many of the trips are family-friendly, as well.

Destinations include Sapelo Island along the coast, The Okefenokee Swamp in the southern part of the state, the Chattahoochee River near Atlanta and

== People ==
Charles McMillan became the group's coastal director in 2015.

== Awards ==
Georgia Conservancy presents the Longleaf Award annually. In 2018, at the 10th annual award ceremony, it presented the award to Katherine Kennedy of Concrete Jungle.

== Publications ==
- Highroad Guide to the Georgia Mountains 1998
- The Georgia Conservancy's Guide to the North Georgia Mountains 1996
- A Guide to the Georgia Coast 1993
