= Sea chest (nautical) =

Type of recess in a ship's hull

The term sea chest is used for a rectangular or cylindrical recess in the hull of a ship.

== Ship's reservoir/filter ==
The sea chest provides an intake reservoir from which piping systems draw raw water. Most sea chests are protected by removable gratings, and contain baffle plates to dampen the effects of vessel speed or sea state. The intake size of sea chests varies from less than 10 cm^{2} to several square metres.

== Zebra mussel control in sea chests ==
When the ship is in freshwater, the hard steel surfaces of the sea chest, protective grates and baffles, combined with low water velocities created in this immediate area, provide a suitable environment for zebra mussel attachment. Zebra mussel infestations have been found to clog the individual intakes and gates of the various water piping systems, decreasing the availability of water for onboard operations, which could result in damage to engines and other components that require water for cooling. Sea chests are, therefore, considered to be the most susceptible component to serious infestation.

Control strategies include coating all surfaces with an antifoulant such as copper-based epoxy paint or hot-dip galvanizing. Periodic inspection and replacement of grates and screens also reduces the risk. Increasing the size of the sea chests by 20% to 30% may delay the onset of serious problems that could force an engine shutdown. Thermal treatment is a highly effective strategy for the control of zebra mussels (McMahon et al. 1995). Thermal treatment may include retrofitting a closed loop system to recirculate the heated water to the sea chest or the addition of a second sea chest system, allowing engine cooling water to be discharged through the idle sea chest. Recirculation of engine cooling water as a thermal control strategy has proved extremely effective in controlling zebra mussels (Palermo 1992, U.S. Coast Guard 1994).
