= Coast Guard Air Station Miami =

US Coast Guard base in Opa-locka, Florida

Coast Guard Air Station Miami
- Opa Locka, Florida in the United States
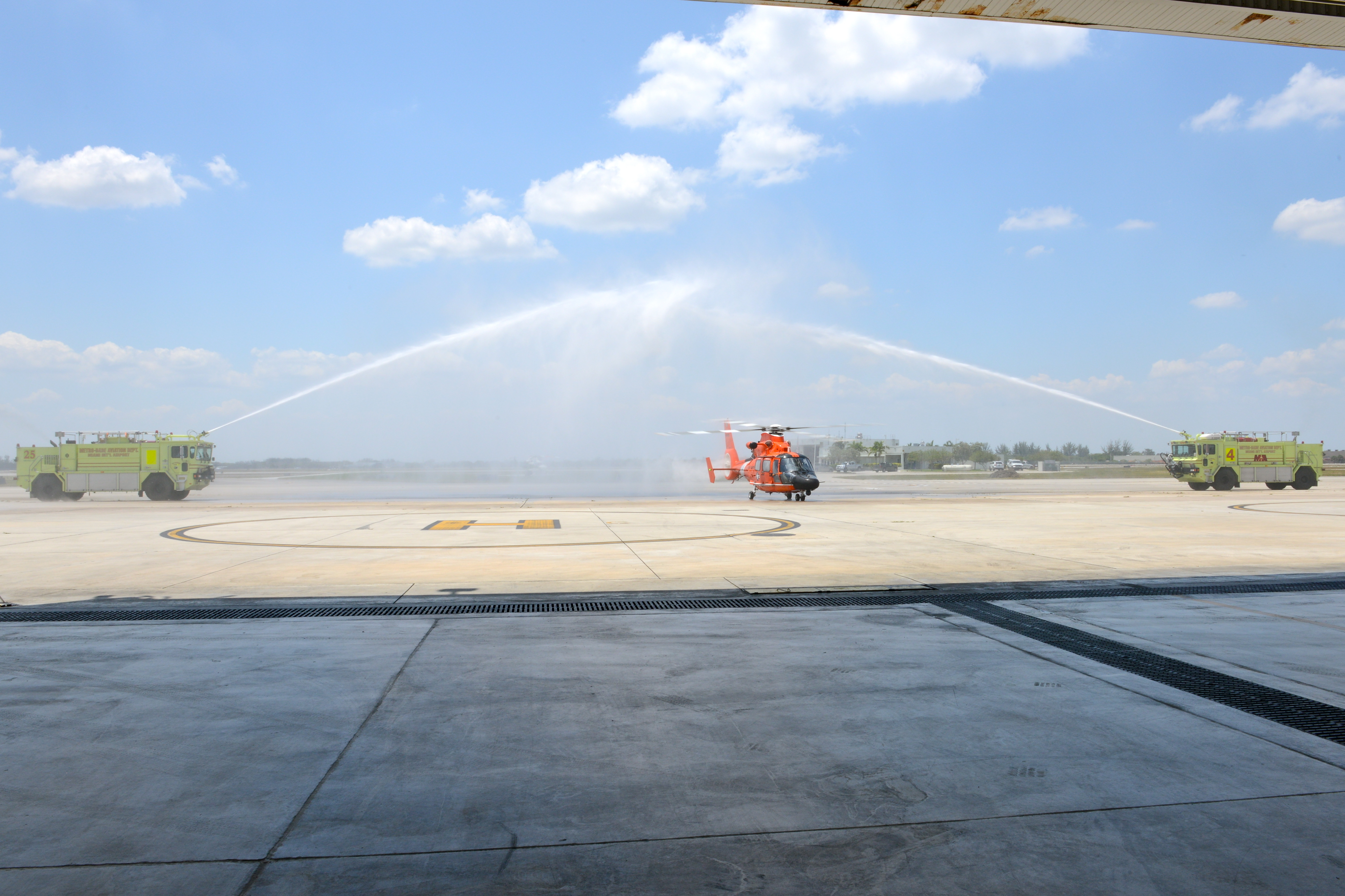
- A MH-65D Dolphin at Coast Guard Air Station Miami

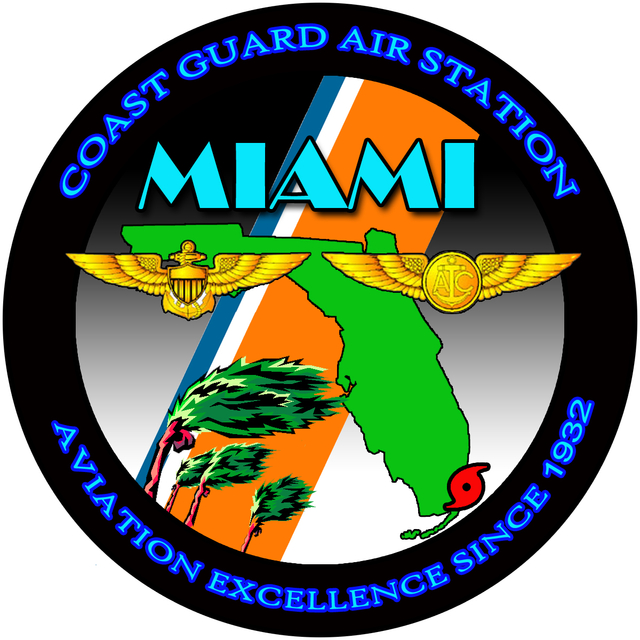

Site information
- Type: Coast Guard Air Station
- Owner: Department of Homeland Security
- Operator: United States Coast Guard
- Controlled by: Seventh District
- Condition: Operational
- Aircraft operated: HC-144A Ocean Sentry (5); MH-65 Dolphin (5)
- Website: Official website

Location
- Location in the United States
- Coordinates: 25°54′28.2″N 80°16′30.79″W

Site history
- Built: 1932 (as Naval Reserve Aviation Training Base)
- In use: 1965 – present

Garrison information
- Current commander: Captain Eric A. Smith

Airfield information
- Identifiers: IATA: OPF, ICAO: KOPF, FAA LID: OPF, WMO: 722024
- Elevation: 2.4 metres (7 ft 10 in) AMSL
Runways
Direction	Length and surface
9L/27R	2,439 metres (8,002 ft) Asphalt
12/30	2,073 metres (6,801 ft) Asphalt
9R/27L	1,313 metres (4,308 ft) Asphalt
- Airfield shared with Miami-Opa Locka Executive Airport; Source: Federal Aviation Administration

Coast Guard Air Station Miami is an Air Station of the United States Coast Guard located at Opa-locka Executive Airport in Opa-locka, Florida. The station operates the HC-144 Ocean Sentry maritime patrol aircraft and the MH-65 Dolphin helicopter.

== History ==
The history of Coast Guard Air Station Miami began in the late 1920s when the city leased land to the United States Navy. Glenn H. Curtiss had been lobbying for the establishment of the Naval Reserve Base in Miami since 1928. This property became a Naval Reserve Aviation Training Base (NRATB).

In 1932 the U.S. Navy leased from the city of Miami what is today the west half of Opa-locka airport. On this land the Navy erected a dirigible mooring mast. The dirigible USS Akron stopped at this mast on both legs of its 1933 trip to the Panama Canal Zone, and departed the station less than two weeks before its fatal crash in April 1933. The base was one of the stops on the triangular Germany-Brazil-United States-Germany route of the Graf Zeppelin.

Amelia Earhart made her second attempt to circumnavigate the globe in 1937. The unpublicized flight began in Oakland, California and from there, Earhart flew to Miami, Florida, landing there on 23 May 1937. But a miscalculation by navigator Fred Noonan had Earhart land her Lockheed Electra at the wrong airport. She first landed at Eastern Air Lines 36th Street Airport, which was closed with no one in the control tower. Earhart took off once again and six minutes later landed at the Miami Municipal Airport. She stayed in Miami for a week or so studying her flight path. Miami was the last place of the continental U.S. that she visited before heading on to the rest of her ill-fated journey. The pair departed Miami on 1 July headed to Puerto Rico, the next immediate stop after Miami.

The All-American Airport was acquired by the City of Miami around 1938 and on this land the city of Miami built the first "Miami International (Master) Airport".

Major expansion of the base began in 1939, and it was commissioned as Naval Air Station Miami (NAS Miami) in 1940.

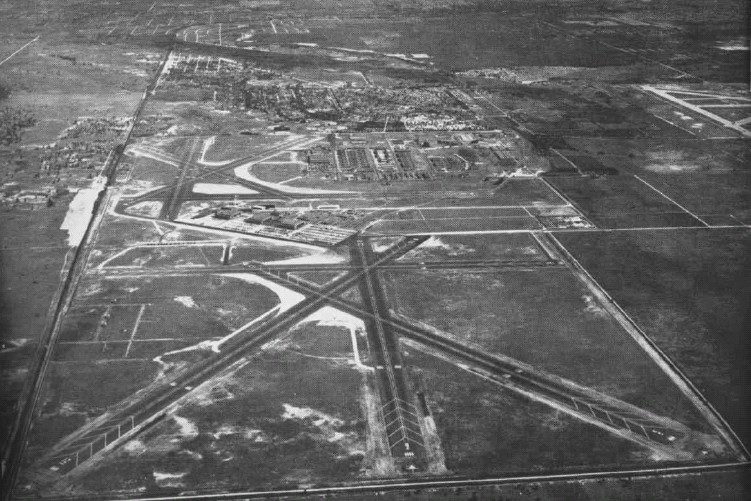
Aerial view of NAS Miami in the mid-1940s

The Naval Reserve Air Base, the Municipal Blimp Hangar, the U.S. Navy's Dirigible Mooring Mast, the city of Miami's Municipal Airport and the All-American Airport existed as separate facilities until their land became incorporated into NAS Miami.

Miami Municipal Airport and Miami International (Master) Airport were purchased from the city by the federal government in 1942 and added to Naval Air Station Miami (NAS Miami) as Miami Municipal Field and Master Field (later referred to colloquially as "Masters Field"), respectively. Miami Municipal Field was connected to Masters Field by a taxiway that crossed the railroad tracks which separated the two fields. Miami Municipal Field was renamed Amelia Earhart Field in 1947. The All-American Air Races were held at Miami Municipal/Amelia Earhart Field or All-American Airport/Miami International (Master) Airport from 1929 until 1935, and the All-American Air Maneuvers from 1935 until 1941 and from 1946 to 1950.

During World War II, NAS Miami was headquarters for operations of the U.S. Naval Air Training Command, with six training bases. NAS Miami consisted of the original training base, known as Mainside or Opa-locka, Miami Municipal Field and Master Field. At its peak, the base employed 7,200 officers and men and 3,100 civilians. Activity continued on a reduced basis after the war.

Following the departure of U.S. Navy, but retention of U.S. Marine Corps Reserve flying and aviation support units, Master Field became Marine Corps Air Station Miami (MCAS Miami) circa 1955. With the transfer of Marine Air Reserve squadrons and support units to NAS Jacksonville, Florida in 1958 and 1959, MCAS Miami was marked for closure and the air station closed as a Department of the Navy installation in 1959. Former military property was transferred to Dade County and the Dade County Junior College opened on the site in 1961.

In 1962 the remainder of the former NAS Miami property, except for a portion reserved for the United States Coast Guard, was transferred to Dade County, and became Opa-locka Airport. In 1965 Coast Guard Air Station Miami transferred its aircraft and operations from its Dinner Key installation to the Opa-locka Airport, re-establishing CGAS Miami on site utilizing one of the former Navy hangars, associated flight line and several support buildings. CGAS Miami continues to operate on site with HC-144 Ocean Sentry fixed-wing aircraft and MH-65 Dolphin helicopters.
