= Kelefa (given name) =

Kelefa is a given name. Notable people with the name include:

- Kelefa Diallo (1959–2013), chief of staff of the Guinean Army
- Kelefa Sanneh (born 1976), British-born American journalist
