= Opa-locka West Airport =

Coordinates: 25°56′56″N 080°25′24″W

Opa-locka West Airport (closed)
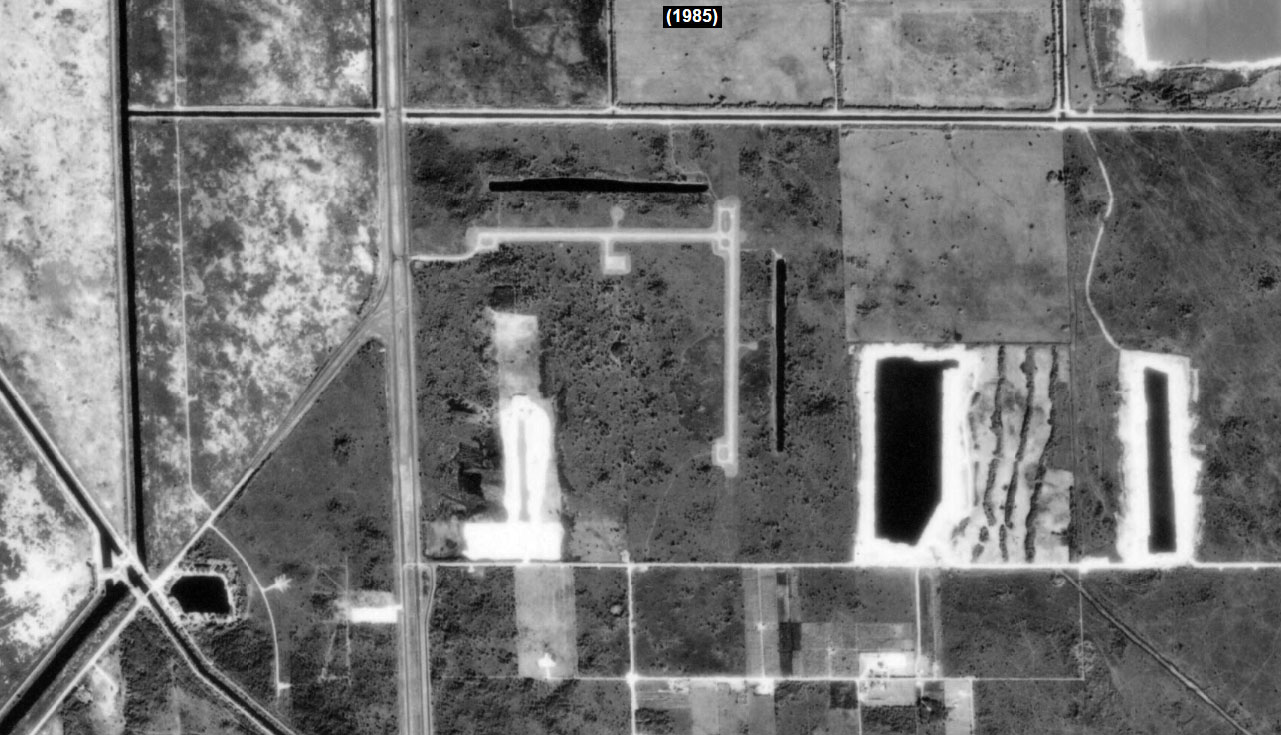
- Aerial view of Opa-Locka West Airport in 1985
- IATA: none; ICAO: none; FAA LID: X46

Summary
- Airport type: Public
- Owner: Miami-Dade Aviation Department (MDAD)
- Serves: Miami, Florida
- Location: Hialeah, Florida
- Elevation AMSL: 8 ft / 2 m

Map
- Interactive map of Opa-locka West Airport (closed)

Runways
Direction	Length		Surface
Direction	ft	m	Surface
9/27	3,000	914	Asphalt
18/36	3,000	914	Asphalt
- Source: Federal Aviation Administration

Opa-locka West Airport (FAA LID: X46) was a county-owned public airport located 12 miles (19 km) northwest of the central business district of Miami, a city in Miami-Dade County, Florida, United States. It covered an area of 420 acres (170 ha) which contained two asphalt paved runways: 9/27 measuring 3,000 x 60 ft (914 x 18 m) and 18/36 measuring 3,000 x 60 ft (914 x 18 m).

The airport opened in 1970 and was designed to relieve congestion at the nearby Opa-locka Airport. There was no public access to the airfield by land, and it served as a remote area for touch-and-go training. Light twin-engine aircraft such as the Cessna 310 were the largest used at this airport. There were no storage facilities and no aircraft based at the airport. Expansion was limited due to the presence of wetlands. The airport had 12,100 general aviation aircraft operations in the year 2002, an average of 33 per day.

The airport was badly damaged by Hurricane Wilma in October 2005. Miami-Dade County announced that the airport would be decommissioned in June 2006. The county planned to use the land as a quarry, with an estimated yield of 47 million cubic feet (1,300,000 m^{3}) of limestone worth between $500 million and $1.2 billion.

Countyline Dragway, a one-eighth mile drag racing strip sanctioned by the International Hot Rod Association (IHRA), operated at the former airport site from January 2007 to May 2014. It was located at the intersection of U.S. Route 27 (Okeechobee Road) and Krome Avenue, just south of the Miami-Dade/Broward county line.
