= IPTN N250 =

Cancelled Indonesian turboprop airliner

N250
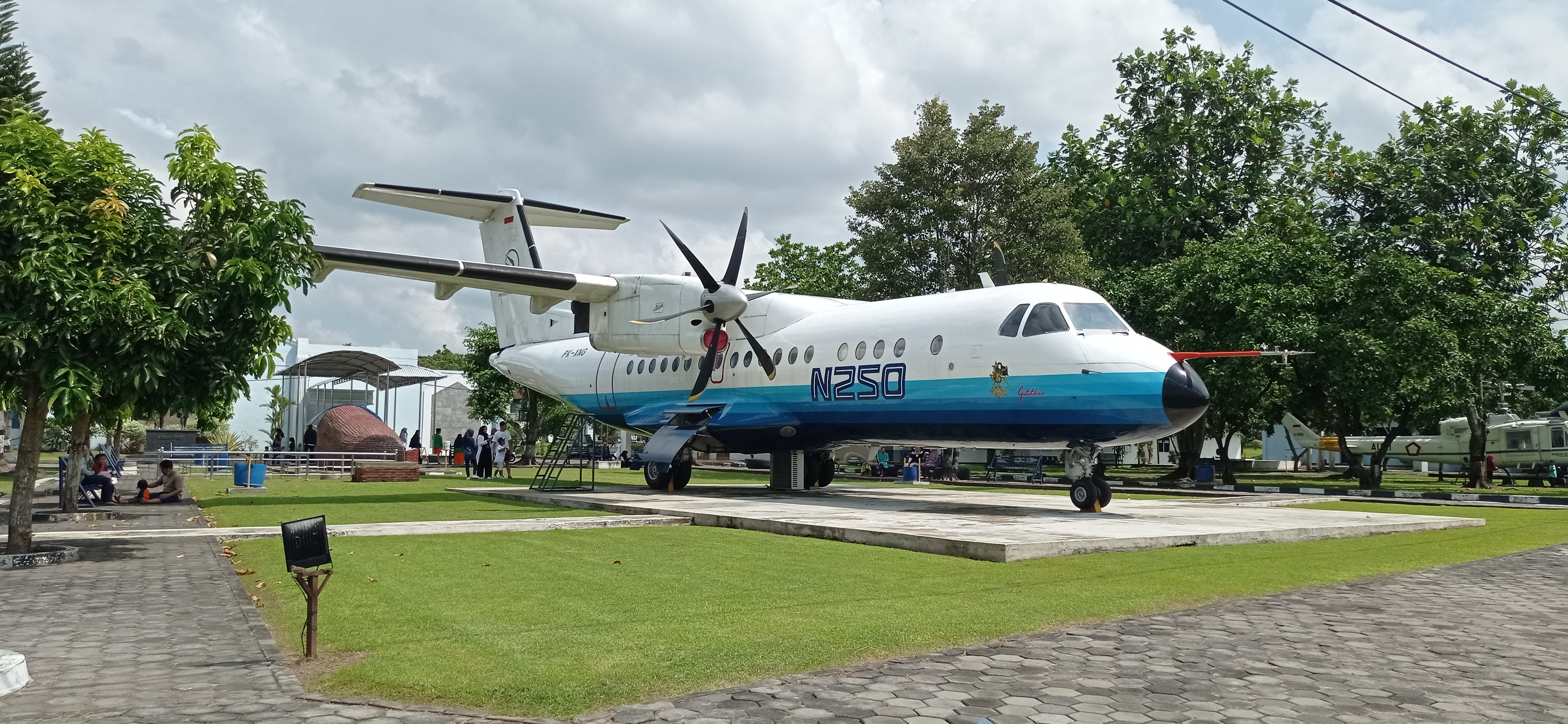
- N250 prototype PA-1 displayed at Dirgantara Mandala Museum

General information
- Type: Turboprop regional airliner
- National origin: Indonesia
- Manufacturer: IPTN / Indonesian Aerospace
- Status: Cancelled
- Number built: 2

History
- Manufactured: 1994–1996
- First flight: 10 August 1995
- Retired: 2000

The IPTN N250 was a turboprop regional airliner designed by Indonesian firm IPTN (Industri Pesawat Terbang Nusantara) (now Indonesian Aerospace). This aircraft was IPTN's first major effort to win the market share of the regional turboprop class of 64–68 seat airliners. The aircraft's development was eventually terminated after the Asian financial crisis of 1998.

== Design and development ==
The N250 development plan was first revealed by PT IPTN (now PT Dirgantara Indonesia, Indonesian Aerospace) at the Paris Air Show in 1989, but was first introduced in 1986 when the Indonesian Air Show 1986 was held. The N250 was initially described as a propfan commuter plane, but on 12 July 1990, IPTN selected the Allison GMA 2100 turboprop to power the aircraft.

In early 1994, Indonesia announced that Great Britain and four states in the United States were interested in hosting production lines for the final assembly of the N250. In January 1995, IPTN added Long Island, New York and Macon, Georgia to the previous list of U.S. semifinalists that included Mobile, Alabama, Phoenix, Arizona, and Portland, Oregon, out of an original list of 26 contender cities. In the following month, IPTN selected Mobile and Macon as the final candidates. On 19 May 1995, Indonesia awarded the U.S. assembly of the N250 to Mobile. The U.S. assembly site would be run by American Regional Aircraft Industry (AMRAI), in which IPTN would hold a 40-percent stake. Planned production was to be one plane per week from IPTN's home factory in Bandung, West Java and up to two planes per week from the Mobile factory. The flying aircraft was officially unveiled at the Indonesian Air Show '96, and it also performed at the 1997 Paris Air Show and the 1998 Asian Aerospace show.

The first assembled prototype, which had a capacity of 50 passengers, was initially rolled out on 10 November 1994 in Bandung during the run-up to the 1994 Asia-Pacific Economic Cooperation (APEC) summit, which Indonesia was hosting. This prototype, which had a serial number of PA-1, then flew for the first time on 10 August 1995. It was successfully tested to a cruise speed of 727.8 kilometers per hour (452.2 mph; 393.0 kn) at 7,600 meters (25,000 ft) altitude, and 744.5 km/h (462.6 mph; 402.0 kn) at 5,200 m (17,000 ft) altitude. The second prototype was a stretched variant with a capacity of 64–68 passengers, and it was designated as the N250-100. The N250-100 was planned to have its first flight in May 1996, but the PA-2 prototype instead had its initial flight eight months behind schedule on 19 December 1996. The third and fourth prototypes were planned to first fly in July 1996 and September 1996 respectively.

Construction for the additional prototypes was halted because of the effects of the Asian financial crisis. Although the IPTN was about halfway through its 1,400-hour flight test program, the International Monetary Fund (IMF) required the Indonesian government to end support of the N250 program as part of the IMF's US$43 billion government bailout plan. Because of this event, IPTN postponed the aircraft's certification from March 1999 to the fourth quarter of 2000. Later, IPTN postponed certification indefinitely so that it could recruit a risk-sharing partner to help complete the program.

=== After termination ===
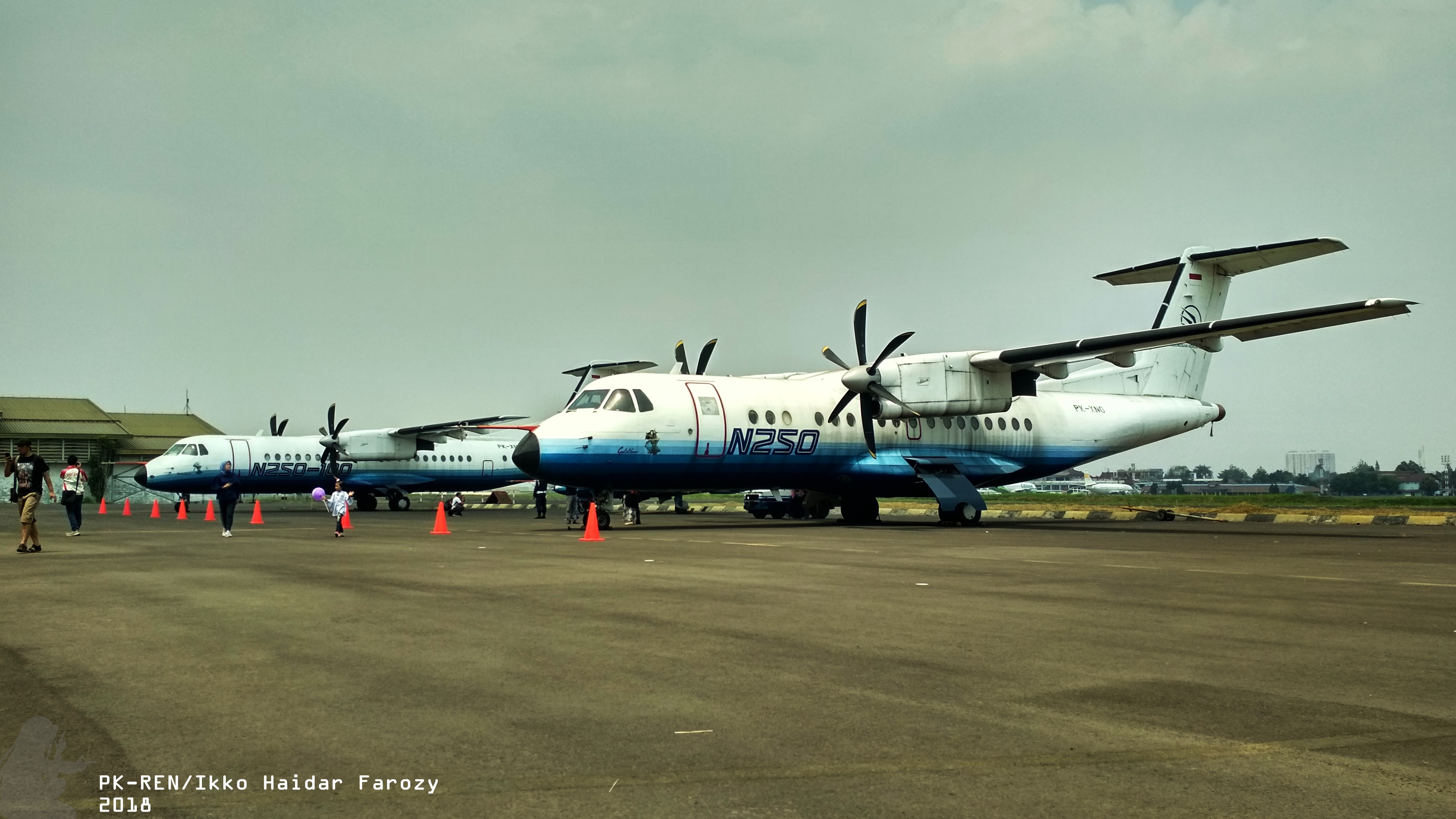
The two N250 prototypes on display at Indonesian Aerospace facility in 2018

There has been some consideration concerning the program's revival by the former director of the IPTN and, later, the former Indonesian president B. J. Habibie after having received approval from the incumbent president Susilo Bambang Yudhoyono. However, to reduce production costs and improve price competitiveness in international markets, changes were made which have resulted in reduced performance such as a reduction in engine capacity, and the removal of the fly-by-wire system. The planned reborn plane was planned to be named N250R.

In August 2012, both developing parties, Erry Firmansyah of PT Eagle Cap and PT Regio Aviasi Industri (RAI), led by both of Habibie's sons, agreed to finance N250. It will use a new name, R80.

On 26 September 2013, Nam Air signed an order for 50 R80 with an option for 50 more aircraft, to be delivered in 2018.

On 22 February 2018, RAI signed a memorandum of understanding with Leonardo Aerostructures to help fund and complete the development of the R80. The company hoped to build four hundred R80 aircraft over 20 years. It completed a preliminary design and feasibility test of the 80-90 seat aircraft in 2016 and hoped to finish detail designing and prototype manufacturing by 2019. RAI planned to build six prototypes, with flight testing from 2020 to 2022, and targeted issuance of a type certificate from the European Aviation Safety Agency (EASA) in 2025. The price of the R80 would be USD$25 million.

B. J. Habibie's son, Ilham Akbar Habibie, advocated for the production of the aircraft as one of its competitors, the Fokker 50, was no longer produced by Fokker which went bankrupt in 1996. The remaining two competitors for the N250 were the ATR 72 and Bombardier Dash 8.

As of 21 August 2020, the PA-1 prototype is on display at Dirgantara Mandala Museum, Yogyakarta, as its 60th collection.

== Variants ==
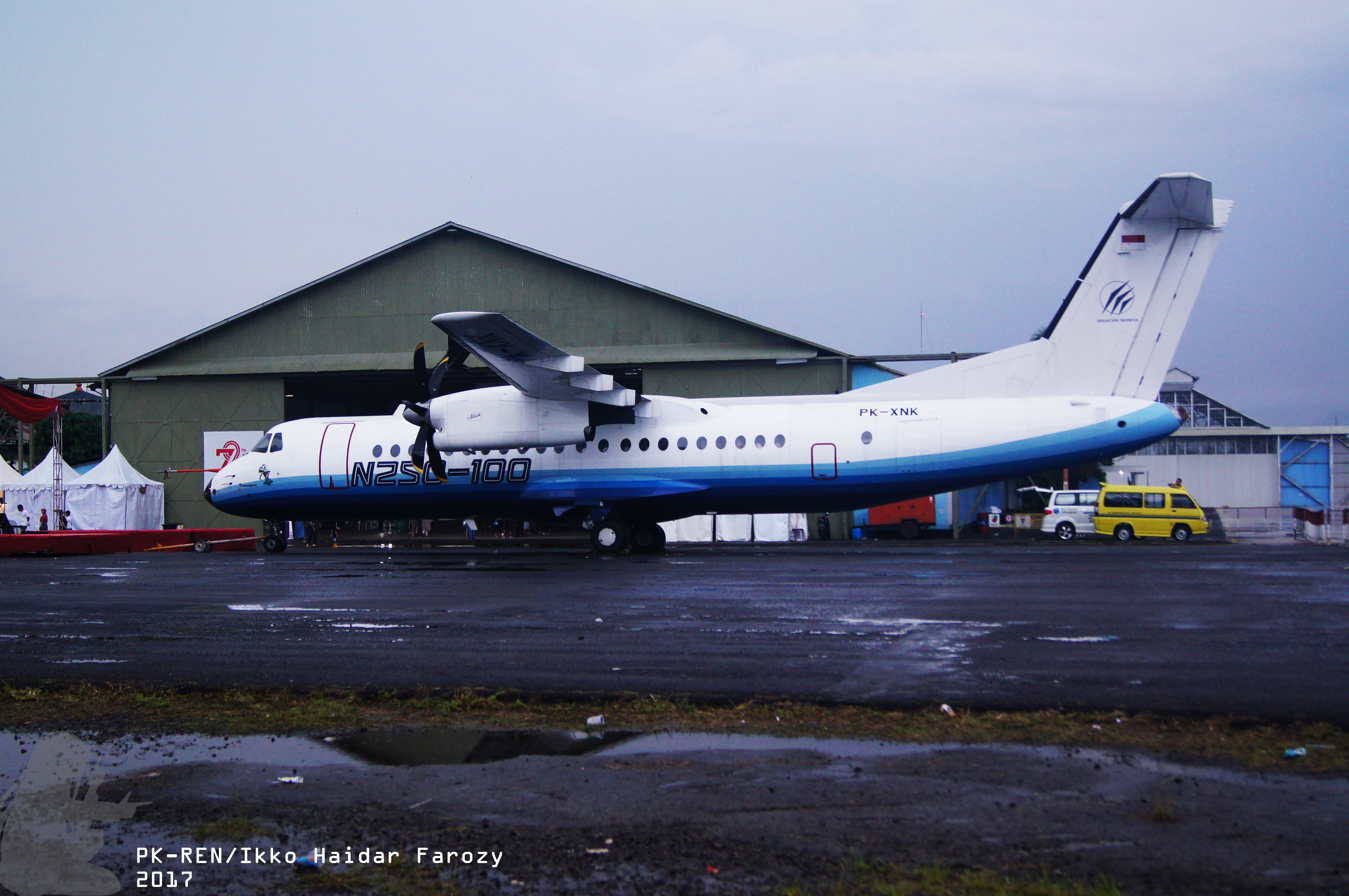
N250-100 prototype PA-2 in 2017

N250
The initial prototype with a capacity of 50 passengers. One produced (PA-1) and named "Gatotkaca"

N250-100
The second prototype is a stretched version, capable of carrying 68 passengers. One produced (PA-2) and named "Krincingwesi". First flight on 19 December 1996.

N270
Further stretched variant, 3 meters longer than N250-100 capable of carrying 72 passengers. Planned to be produced as the third prototype (PA-3) and will be named "Putut Guritno" or "Koco Negoro". Completion was planned for 18 months after N250-100's first flight and some integral parts like the fuselage, center wing and engines were already or almost completed, however development stalled after the Asian financial crisis of 1998. Also known as the N250-200.

RAI R80 RegioProp
Rebuilding program of N250 by B.J. Habibie under PT Regio Aviasi Industri. Planned for conducting its first flight between 2019 and 2020. When finished, it will be able to carry up to 92 passengers with a range of up to 800 nm (1.481 km). LoIs have been signed by NAM Air for ordering 100 planes consisting of 50 firm orders and 50 optional orders, and Kalstar Aviation for 25 planes. Other airlines that have expressed their interest including Wings Air, Citilink, Sky Aviation and Merpati Nusantara Airlines.

== Specifications (N250-100) ==
Data from Jane's all the World's Aircraft 2000–01

General characteristics

- Crew: 2
- Capacity: 64-68 passengers / 6,200 kg (13,669 lb) payload
- Length: 28.15 m (92 ft 4 in)
- Wingspan: 28 m (91 ft 10 in)
- Height: 8.79 m (28 ft 10 in)
- Wing area: 65 m^{2} (700 sq ft)
- Aspect ratio: 12:1
- Airfoil: root: NASA MS(1)-0317 (modified NASA MD2); tip: NASA MS(1)-0317 (modified NASA MD3)
- Empty weight: 15,700 kg (34,613 lb) operating empty weight
- Max takeoff weight: 24,800 kg (54,675 lb)
- Fuel capacity: 4,200 kg (9,259 lb)
- Powerplant: 2 × Allison AE2100C turboprop engines, 2,439 kW (3,271 hp) each
- Propellers: 6-bladed Dowty Rotol R384/6123-FX8, 3.81 m (12 ft 6 in) diameter constant-speed fully feathering reversible propellers

Performance

- Cruise speed: 611 km/h (380 mph, 330 kn)
- Stall speed: 195 km/h (121 mph, 105 kn) EAS flaps up, power off
- Range: 1,270 km (790 mi, 690 nmi)
- Service ceiling: 9,140 m (30,000 ft)
- Wing loading: 381.5 kg/m^{2} (78.1 lb/sq ft)
- Power/mass: 0.197 kW/kg (0.120 hp/lb)

== See also ==
Related development

- Indonesian Aerospace N245

Aircraft of comparable role, configuration, and era

- ATR 72
- Bombardier Q400
- Saab 2000
