= CASA/IPTN CN-235 =

Family of transport aircraft by CASA and IPTN

CN-235
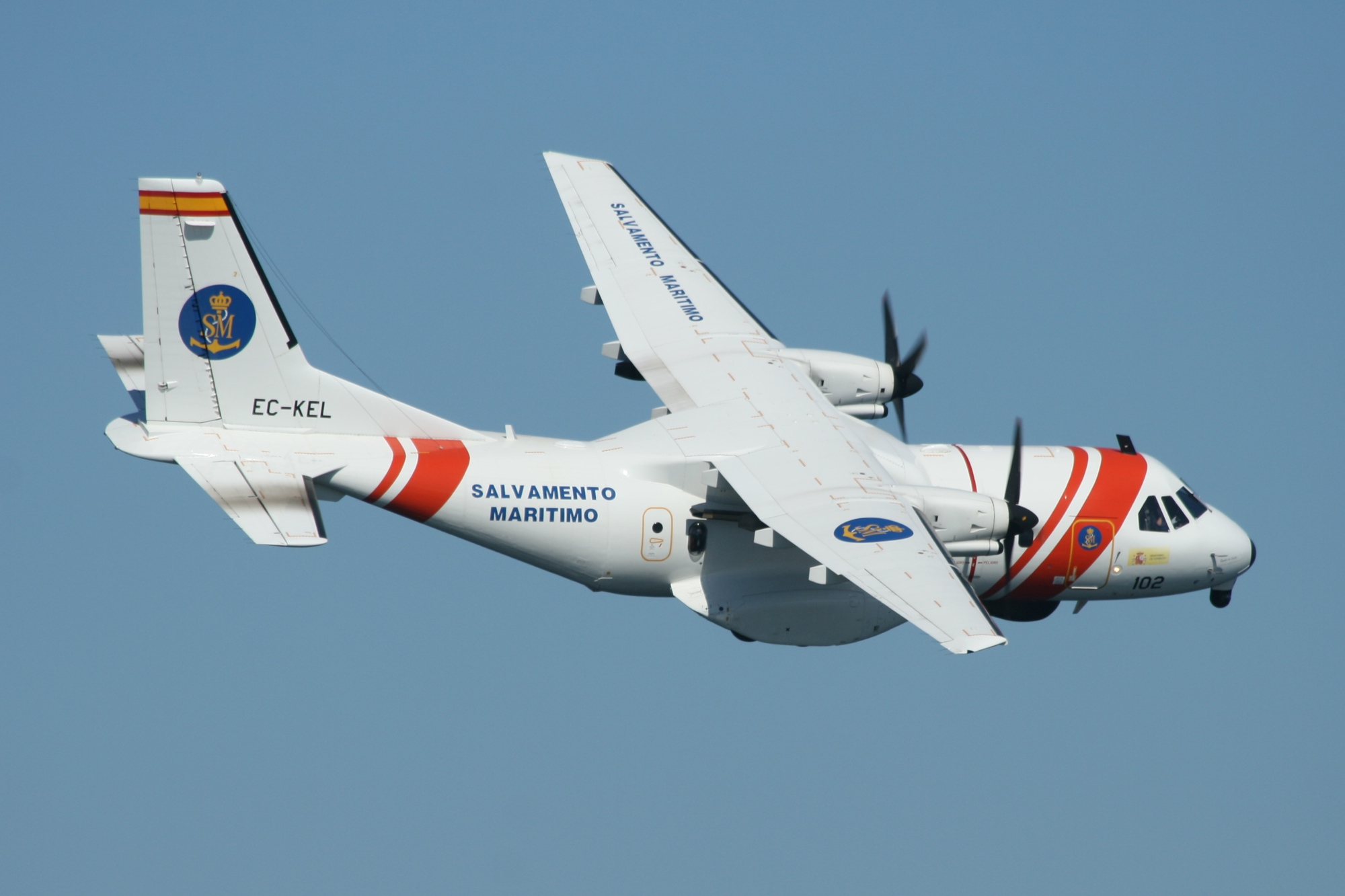
- A CASA CN-235 of the Spanish Maritime Safety and Rescue Society

General information
- Type: Transport aircraft / maritime patrol aircraft
- National origin: Spain / Indonesia
- Manufacturer: CASA; IPTN
- Status: In service
- Primary users: Turkish Air Force French Air and Space Force; Indonesian Air Force; Royal Malaysian Air Force
- Number built: 286 (IPTN 69)

History
- Manufactured: 1983–present
- Introduction date: 1 March 1988
- First flight: 11 November 1983
- Variant: EADS HC-144 Ocean Sentry
- Developed into: EADS CASA C-295; Indonesian Aerospace N245

The CASA/IPTN CN-235 is a medium-range twin-engined turboprop tactical transport aircraft that was jointly developed by CASA of Spain and Indonesian manufacturer IPTN. It is operated as both a regional airliner and military transport; its primary military roles include air transport and aerial surveillance.

Development of the CN-235 formally commenced in 1980 following the formation of the Airtech International joint venture on 17 October 1979. Its existence was publicly unveiled at the 1981 Paris Airshow. On 11 November 1983, the prototype CN-235 conducted its maiden flight; the first production aircraft followed on 19 August 1986. On 1 March 1988, the aircraft was put into regular service. Early on, the production of each aircraft was divided, 65% being performed by IPTN while the remainder was performed by CASA. Although the vast majority of CN-235s have been produced for military customers, several airlines have opted to buy limited numbers for regional services as well. In addition to the standard aircraft, specialised CN-235s have been configured into armed gunships and maritime patrol aircraft.

While both the development and early production of the CN-235 had been performed as a joint effort, the partnership arrangement between CASA and IPTN was only applicable to the Series 10 and Series 100/110 aircraft. Some of the later versions of the CN-235 have been developed by each company independently of the other's efforts. Accordingly, both companies have produced their own derivatives of the aircraft, such as the stretched EADS CASA C-295 and the passenger-orientated Indonesian Aerospace N245. Over 240 of all versions of CN-235 are in service, and the type has reportedly accumulated more than 500,000 flight hours. Its largest user is Turkey, which operates 59 aircraft.

== Design and development ==
=== Background ===
The CN-235 has been conceived of during the late 1970s as a twin-turboprop powered transport capable of accommodating up to 35 passengers or various military payloads. It had been observed that there was a growing global market for such transports, while there was also a need in the domestic market. The Spanish aerospace company Construcciones Aeronáuticas SA (CASA) was keen to seek out international collaboration to develop this concept into a working programme, and promptly approach the newly formed Indonesian company IPTN (later known as Indonesian Aerospace or PT. Dirgantara Indonesia). The company was offered an equal share in the venture along with technology transfer opportunities from CASA, and was presented as being mutually beneficial from an economic standpoint. Coincidentally, IPTN had been independently looking into possible configurations for such an aircraft prior to CASA's approach.

The presented terms being agreeable, CASA and IPTN quickly formalised the programme as a joint venture initiative; on 17 October 1979, they formed Airtech International to design, develop, manufacture, and market the new aircraft. Management comprised senior members of both companies, such as Airtech's president also being the president of IPTN, while its vice president was also the president of CASA. During November 1979, the first technical team visit from IPTN was made to CASA's Madrid facilities, while the first joint meeting was held in Bandung two months later. During the first half of 1980, various configurations were studied, including a stretched derivative of the CASA C-212 Aviocar, multiple clean-sheet wide-body aircraft with rectangular and circular-shaped fuselages.

The selected configuration for the aircraft featured a relatively wide fuselage for its size, complete with a rear-facing ramp suitable for all-purpose transport duties. Its main cabin facilitated a four-abreast single-aisle seating arrangement, which could accommodate up to 44 passengers in the most dense seating configuration. The design philosophy of "a big aircraft in a small plane" was practiced, leading to be equipped to suit various situations and operating conditions present in both industrialised and developing countries. This led to the pursuit of performance attributes such as good accessibility for cargo transportation, the quick and convenient conversion between cargo and passenger transport operations, along with readiness to be equipped to perform other roles such as aerial firefighting, cropdusting, and other niche roles. Many features were specifically pursued as to ensure the aircraft's value to the Indonesian market and to capture sufficient early orders there that it would allow for economies of scale to make the aircraft highly cost-competitive on the international market.

During January 1980, preliminary design work commenced. From 1980 to 1983, the second phase of development took place, starting with the detailed design work, tools manufacturing, component production, final assembly, and cumulating in the completion of initial prototypes. The project was publicly debuted at the 1981 Paris Airshow. In addition to the display of a mock-up, sales contracts were signed and a memorandum of understanding was signed between Airtech and General Electric for the aircraft to be powered by the latter's General Electric CT7 turboprop engine.

=== Into flight ===
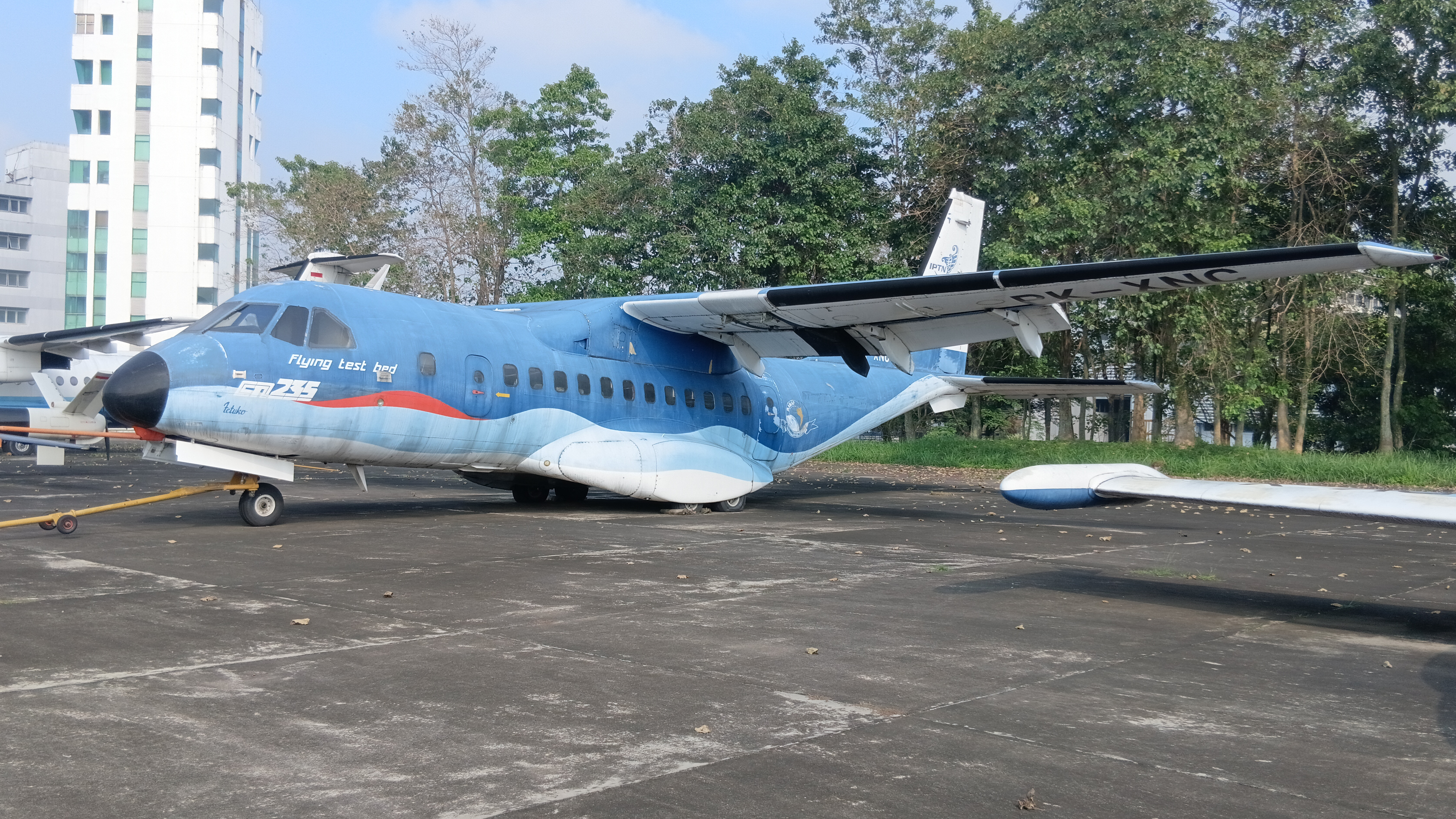
PK-XNC "Tetuko", the IPTN-built CN-235 prototype. Note the engines were removed.

On 10 September 1983, the first pair of prototypes were officially rolled out simultaneously at Getafe and Bandung in ceremonies attended by both King Juan Carlos I of Spain and President Suharto of Indonesia. On 11 November 1983, the first CASA-built prototype performed its maiden flight; on 30 December 1983, the first IPTN-built prototype made its first flight. Unusually, early testing had involved only minimal use of windtunnels, while it was also decided to only construct a pair of prototypes, decisions that constrained and protracted the later flight testing process. New testing facilities in Indonesia were established with the assistance of the German Aerospace Center. Amongst other aspects, the CN-235 proved to have easy handling characteristics. Extensive weight and drag-minimisation efforts were undertaken, one benefit of which was that the subsequent production aircraft were reportedly 10% lighter than the prototypes.

The third phase of development was to secure certification and to conduct the aircraft's first delivery to customers. In support of this effort, static and fatigue testing was conducted by the Serpong Laboratory for Structural Testing. By September 1984, orders for several dozen aircraft had been secured at a reported unit cost of $6m; many of these early orders for the type had originated from local customers within the two partner company's home nations.

Certification from both the Spanish and Indonesian authorities was received on 20 June 1986; the first flight of a production-standard aircraft was conducted on 19 August 1986. Type certification from the Federal Aviation Administration (FAA) was granted on 3 December 1986, permitting the CN-235 to be operated in North America. The first deliveries to customers took place during 1987. On 1 March 1988, the CN-235 officially entered service.

By May 1989, there were 133 firm orders for the CN-235, 74 had been placed by military operators while 59 were attributed to civil operators; of these, 85 had been ordered by Indonesian customers while 22 were attributable to Spanish customers alone, and the remainder to international customers. In comparison to international competitors, such as the De Havilland Canada Dash 8 and the ATR 42, it was a slightly slower aircraft but had a relatively wide body, making it favourable for moving containerised cargos and even jet engines, a task traditionally performed by much larger aircraft.

As per the early production arrangements, roughly 65% of each aircraft was produced in Bandung, while 35% was manufactured in Getafe; this workshare arrangement was the case regardless of whether rollout occurred in Spain or Indonesia. While the airframe was fully produced locally by IPTN, the engines, control and communication systems were all produced in either Europe or the United States. The lower wages present in Indonesia have been a key factor in enabling the CN-235 to be economically produced at its relatively low purchase price.

Both CASA and IPTN were keen to further develop the CN-235, the original prototypes were quickly adapted to serve as flying test beds to support these efforts. By 1992, multiple versions had already been developed, and more were underway. These were often produced in response to specific customer requirements, such as to perform maritime reconnaissance. Development of the initial versions had been carried out jointly by the two companies. Perhaps the most significant derivative of the aircraft was launched in 1995 by CASA in the form of a stretched CN-235. This aircraft would be produced as the C-295.

Indonesia has sought greater autonomy from Airbus (whom CASA has been integrated into) in the CN-235 manufacturing process; the Indonesian Ministry of Defence (MoD) has made this objective a part of the offset conditions should the Airbus A400M Atlas strategic transport aircraft be procured for the Indonesian Air Force.

== Operational history ==
=== Military sector ===
Amongst the first customers for the CN-235 was the French Air and Space Force, which had ordered an initial eight aircraft by May 1989. In April 2010, Hervé Morin, French Minister of Defence, announced the order of eight CN-235-300s from Spain. By 2015, the service had expanded its fleet to 27 aircraft. During mid-2020, a French CN-235 was amongst those assets deployed to Mauritius to assist in pollution control efforts after the MV Wakashio oil spill.

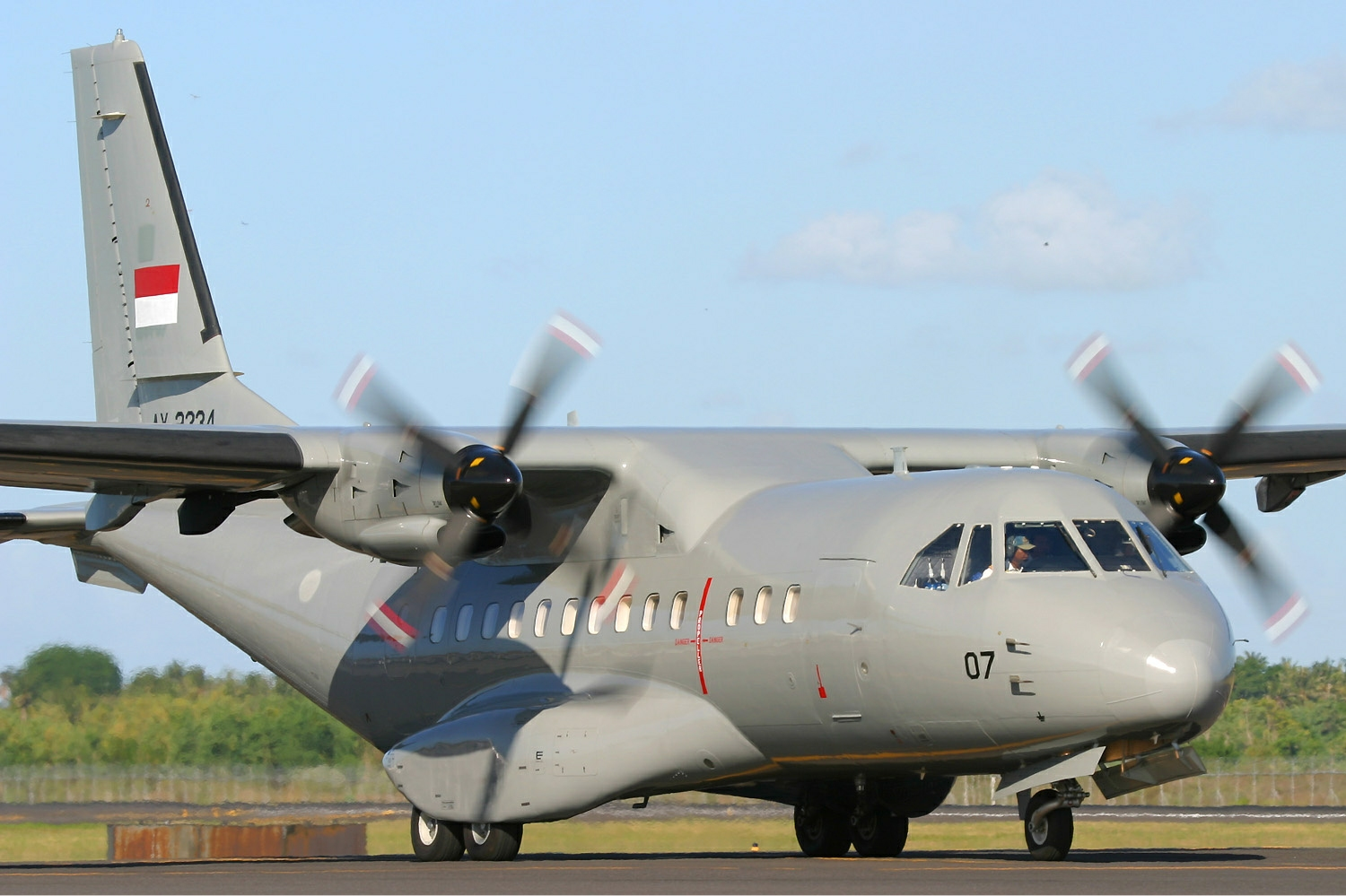
A brand new Airtech CN-235 MPA with test registration, July 2005

Several sizable early orders from the Indonesian armed forces made it the largest customer for the CN-235 early on. By May 1989, the Indonesian Air Force alone had ordered 32 aircraft while the Indonesian Navy had ordered 18 CN-235s, six of which in a maritime surveillance configuration. During December 2009, the Indonesian Navy ordered its first batch of three CN-235 MPAs; the first of these aircraft, based at Juanda Naval base in Surabaya, East Java, were declared operational in October 2013. In November 2016, the Indonesian Air Force also commenced operations with the latest generation of CN-235 MPAs, equipped with winglets and new electronic support apparatus.

The Spanish armed forces also placed modest early orders for the type, by May 1989, two VIP-configured CN-235s had been ordered by the Spanish Air Force. In 2000, the Future Medium Transport Aircraft II (FATAM II) program was launched, under which a batch of nine C-295s was ordered for the Spanish Air Force to take the place of eight CN-235s that were converted from a general transport configuration into maritime patrol and search-and-rescue aircraft, while between four and six CN-235s were assigned to training operations, their reassignment having noticeably depleted the service's medium transport fleet. In December 2007, Spain ordered a pair of CN-235 MPA for the Guardia Civil, making it the first fixed-wing aircraft to be operated by the agency.

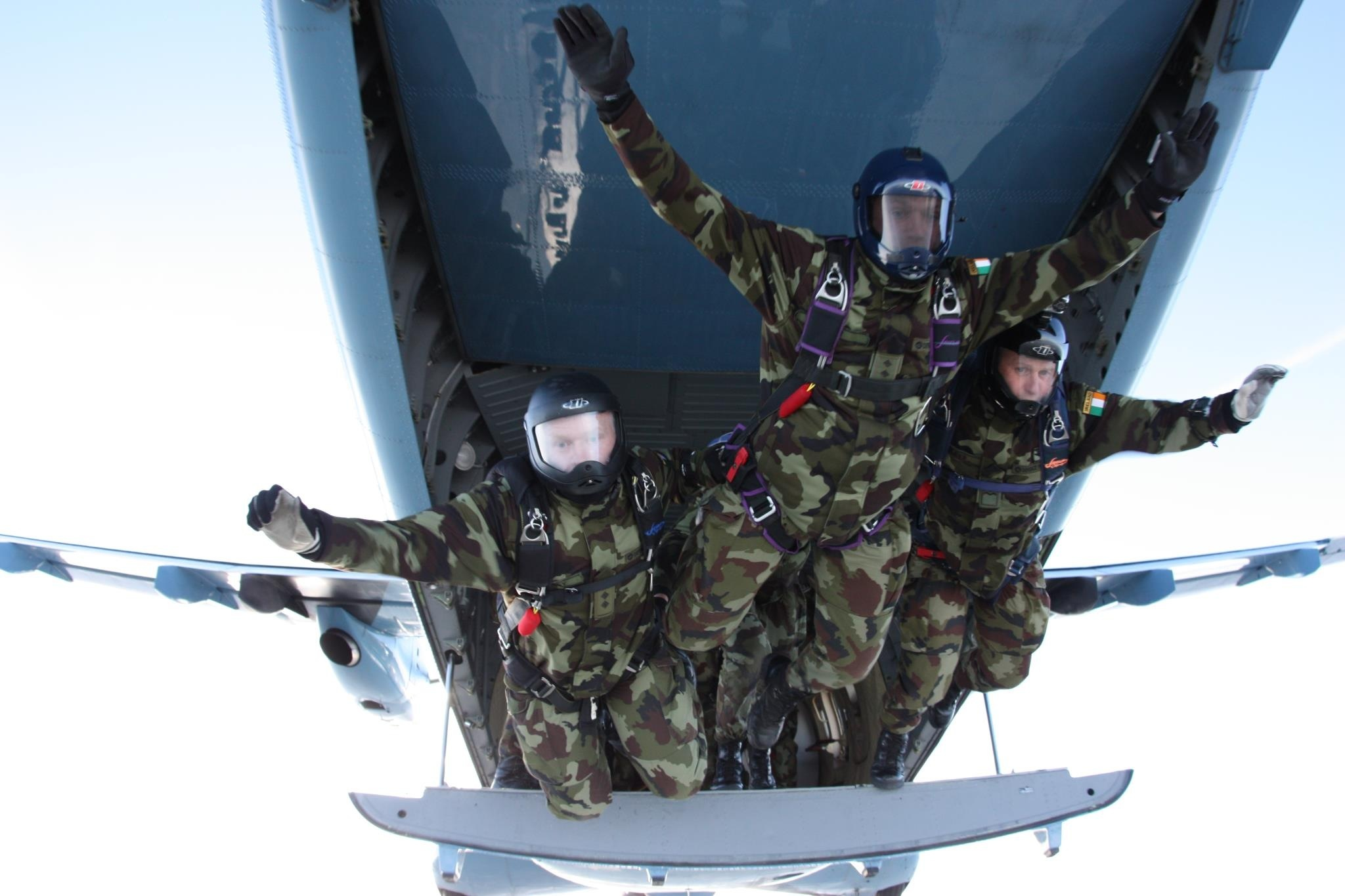
Irish Defence Forces parachutists exiting from a CN-235, December 2013

During the early 1990s, the Irish Air Corps became interested in the type, initially opting to lease a single aircraft directly from CASA in 1992. Two years later, a pair of CN-235s configured for maritime surveillance operations were delivered to the Air Corps. During 2021, amid the Fall of Kabul and the US withdrawal from Afghanistan, one of the CN-235s was flown to the nation to assist with the evacuation. In 2022, Irish CN-235s have been deployed to provide humanitarian aid to, as well as evacuate wounded civilians from, Ukraine.

In December 2002, the Colombian Navy ordered two CN-235 configured for maritime patrol and anti-drug trafficking missions. During July 2010, a third MPA-configured aircraft was delivered. In April 2012, Colombia awarded a contract to Telephonics to replace the original radars of the two older CN-235s with the APS-143 OceanEye marine surveillance Radar.

In April 2005, Venezuela ordered two CN-235 maritime surveillance aircraft along with ten transport planes. However, during the following year, the transaction was halted due to the refusal of the United States government to allow the transfer of what they deemed to be US technology in the aircraft's avionics.

In January 2006, Thailand came to a tentative bartering arrangement with Indonesian Aerospace for ten aircraft, six of which were for the Ministry of Defence and the remaining four for the Ministry of Agriculture. An additional aircraft was ordered on 19 September 2014.

During July 2008, the Mexican Navy announced that it would purchase six CN-235s. In November 2011, the first aircraft was accepted by the service; it was configured to conduct search and rescue, disaster relief, and drug interdiction missions. During May 2012, the final of four CN-235 MPAs was delivered to the Mexican Navy.

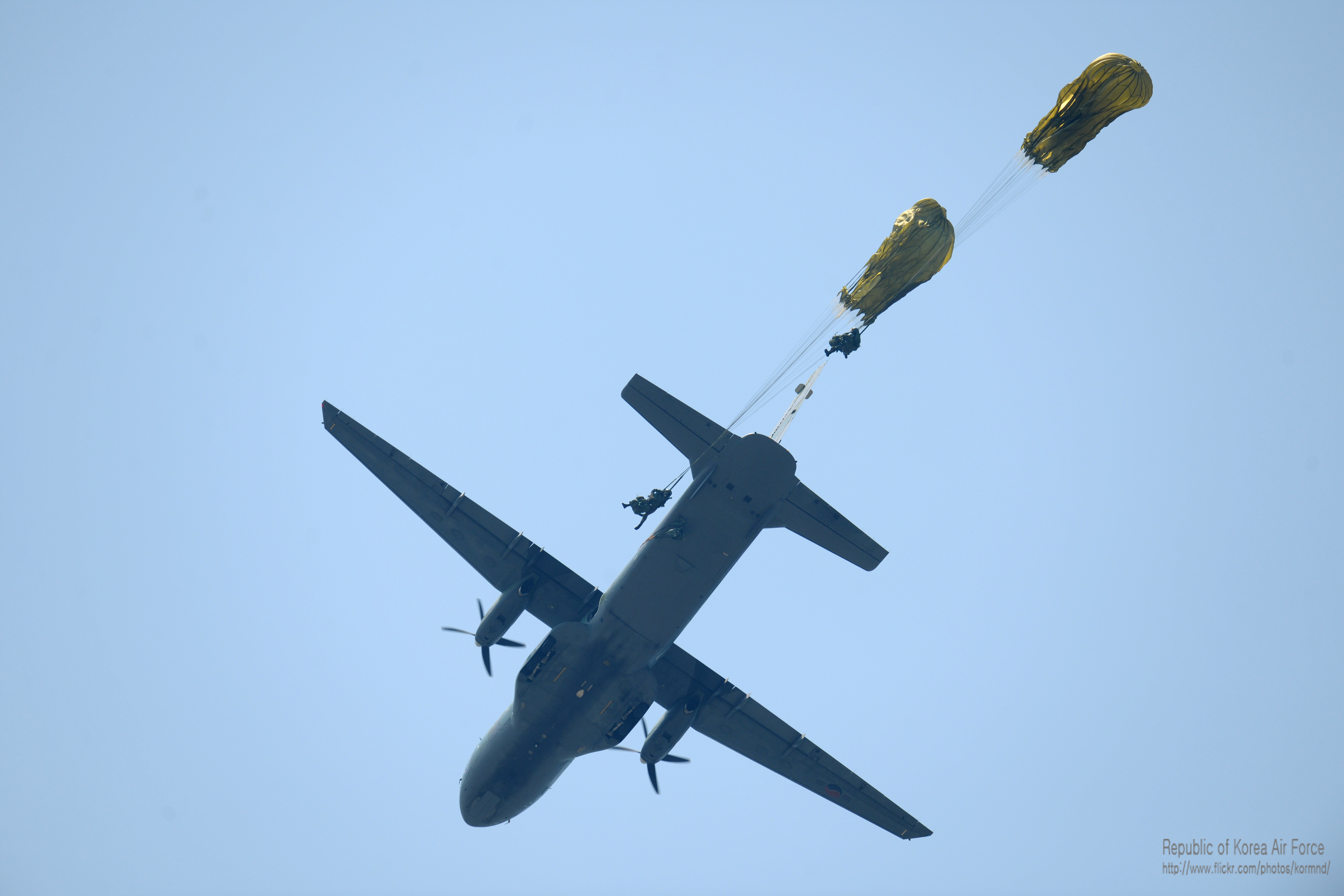
Paratroopers deploying from a CN-235 of the South Korean Air Force, April 2011

In December 2008, South Korea announced that Indonesian Aerospace's bid had triumphed over four rival submissions, and thus it would order four CN-235-110 MPAs to equip the South Korean Coast Guard with; these aircraft, delivered in 2011, had a reported per unit cost of $23 million.

On behalf of the Royal Jordanian Air Force, a light gunship version of the CN-235 was developed; it was introduced to service in May 2014. Collaborators in the project included the King Abdullah II Design and Development Bureau of Jordan, and the U.S. defense company Orbital ATK.

Turkey has become the largest operator of the CN-235, by October 1998, it already had placed cumulative orders for 52 transport-configured aircraft, and would order an additional nine CN-235 MPAs by the end of the year. The aircraft were produced under license by Turkish Aerospace in their Ankara plant. During the 2000s, a modification programme was undertaken to equip 19 Turkish Navy and coastguard aircraft with new maritime surveillance equipment supplied mainly by Thales. Throughout the 2022 Russian invasion of Ukraine, CN-235 MPAs of the Turkish Navy heavily patrolled the Black Sea, these have repeatedly detected sea mines and aided in de-mining efforts. All aircraft are undergoing avionics modernizations while some are being retrofitted for customized roles such as border security.

The Royal Malaysian Air Force has operated a fleet of CN-235 transports. During early 2020, it was announced that several Malaysian aircraft would be converted into a maritime surveillance configuration using financial assistance from the United States. On 17 June 2022, the Royal Malaysian Air Force receive the first of three such modified CN235-220M MSA as part of the Malaysian Maritime Security Initiative program.

Between 2010 and 2012, the Senegalese Air Force acquired two CN-235s at a reported cost of $13 million. In 2013, the service declared it planned to buy two more aircraft for VIP and cargo duties, and that it was also interested in the MPA version as well. During 2018, Senegal ordered two MPA-configured CN-235s, the first of which was received in 2021.

On January 10, 2024, Indonesian President Joko Widodo offered the CN-235 ASW of PT Dirgantara Indonesia for the Philippine Navy during his visit to Manila.

=== Commercial airliner ===
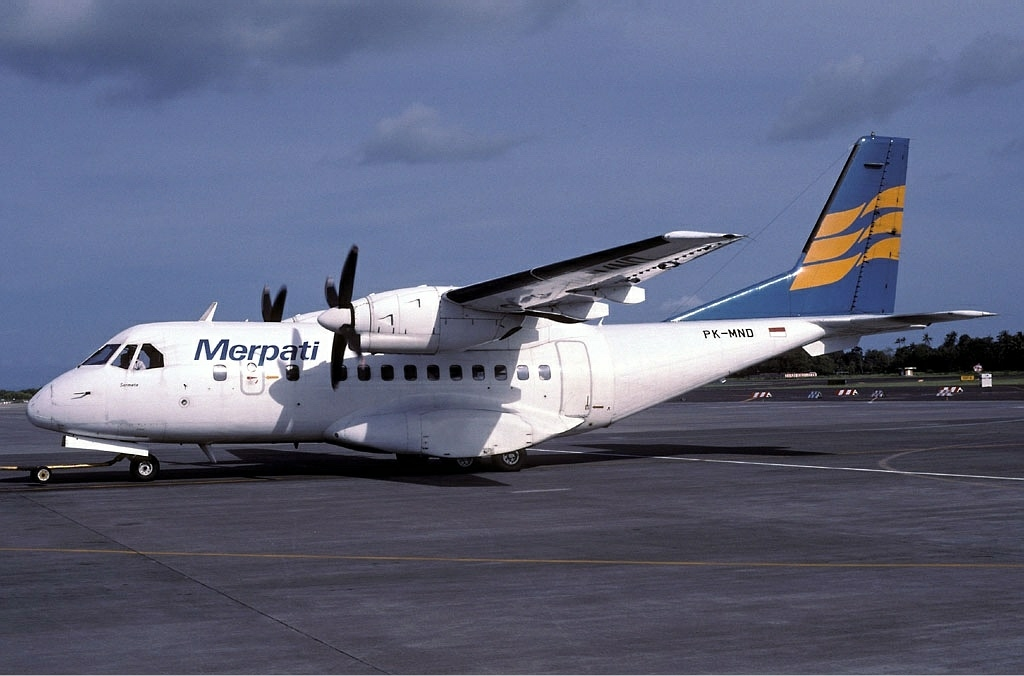
A CN-235 of Merpati Nusantara Airlines in Indonesia

Although the CN-235 has been initially designed as a military transport, it has also been offered to civil operators, usually as a commercial airliner. It has not achieved substantial sales in this role compared to competing 50-seat commuter aircraft such as the Fokker 50, ATR 42 and De Havilland Canada DHC-8. Iberia LAE, Spain's flag carrier, emerged as an early customer, opting to purchase four CN-235s from CASA to serve on its regional routes. It, and its subsidiaries Binter Canarias and Binter Mediterraneo, operated the type between 1989 and 1997, opting to procure several larger ATR 72s to replace it.

Numerous Indonesian operators had placed early orders for the CN-235; by 1992, there were internal routes served by the type between most of the major cities in the country. The Indonesian operator Merpati Nusantara Airlines emerged as the largest civilian operator of the CN-235, at one point having 15 examples in its fleet alone. In April 1995, the company decided to proceed with a leasing arrangement to operate additional aircraft.

During 1992, Aerolíneas Argentinas, which was a subsidiary of Iberia at that time, ordered a pair of CN-235s to be operated by its own subsidiary, Austral. In August 2006, it was reported that several CASA CN-235-10 were in service with African airlines, including two operated by Safair and one with Tiko Air. Around 2007, Asian Spirit operated a lone CN-235-220 in the Philippines.

During 2015, Indonesian Aerospace announced that they were in the early stages of developing a new variant of the CN-235, the N245, which has been specifically designed to perform civil operations and is able to carry up to 60 passengers. Alternatively also referred to as the CN-235NG, this variant is planned to be fully launched following the completion of the Indonesian Aerospace N219 project, at one point, it was expected to be fully certified sometime in 2019. A further derivative has been envisioned, referred to as the N-270, it is a stretched version of the N245 and is planned to be able to carry up to 70–90 passengers; the original timeframe for development was set between 2019 and 2024.

== Variants ==
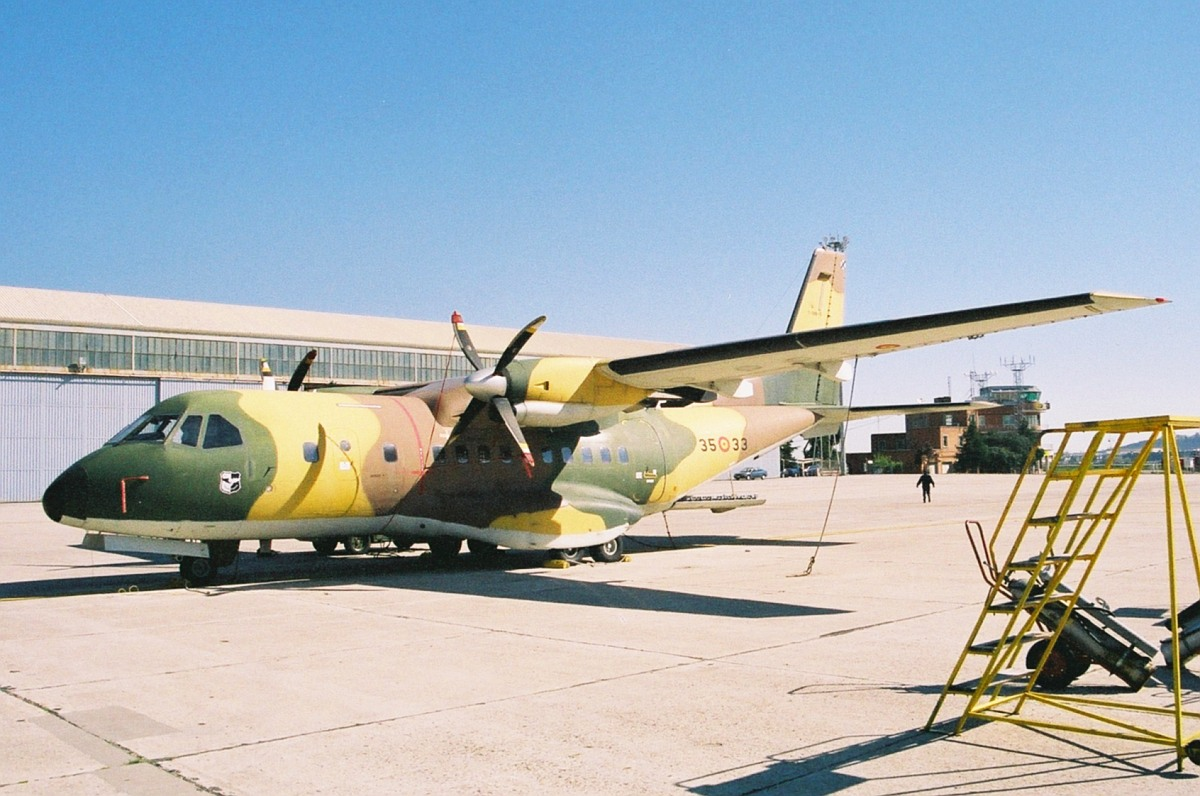
A CASA CN-235 of the Spanish Air Force

CN-235-10
Initial production version (15 built by each company), with GE CT7-7A engines.

CN-235-100/110
Generally as series 10, but with GE CT7-9C engines in new composites nacelles; replaced Series 10 in 1988 from 31st production aircraft. Series 100 is Spanish-built, series 110 Indonesian-built, with improved electrical, warning and environmental systems.

CN-235-200/220
Improved version. Structural reinforcements to cater for higher operating weights, aerodynamic improvements to wing leading-edges and rudder, reduced field length requirements and much-increased range with maximum payload. Series 200 is Spanish-built, Series 220 Indonesian-built. Series 220 still in production.

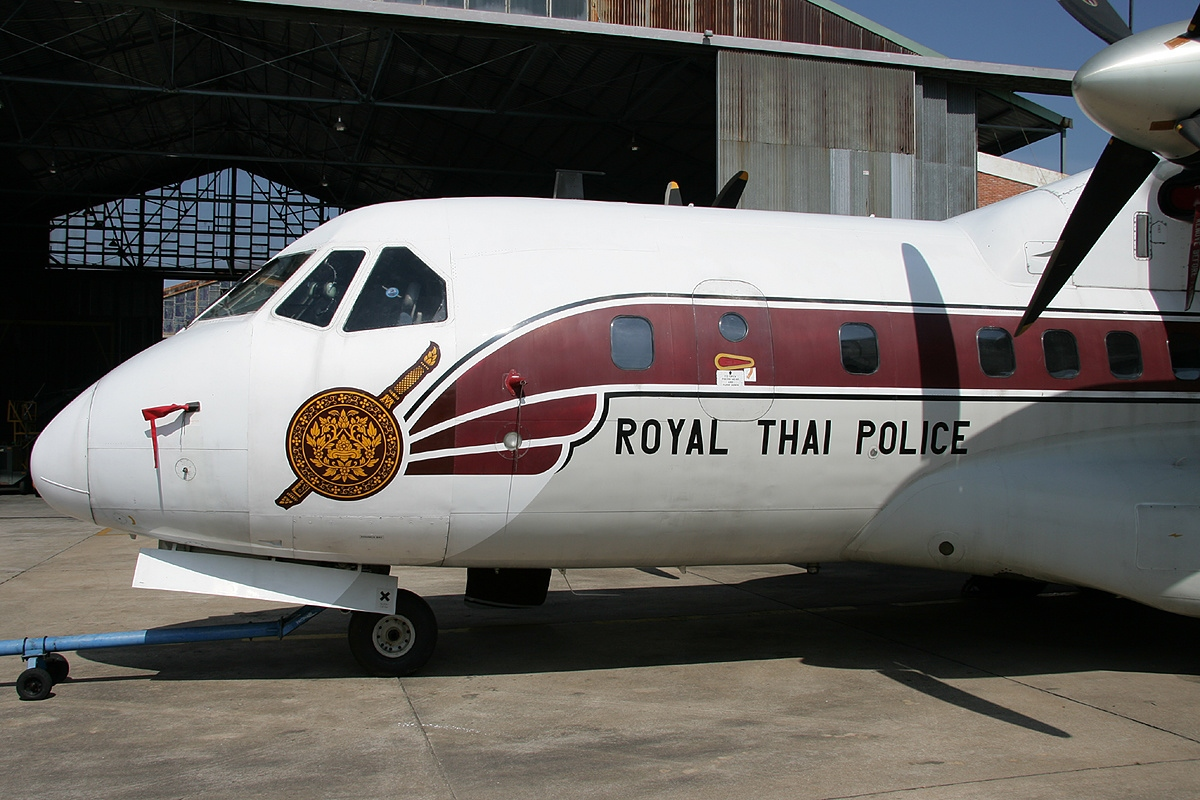
CN-235-200M of the Royal Thai Police

CN-235-300
CASA modification of 200/220 series, with the Honeywell International Corp. avionics suite. Other features include improved pressurization and provision for optional twin-nosewheel installation.

CN-235-330 Phoenix
Modification of Series 200/220, offered by IPTN with new Honeywell avionics, ARL-2002 EW system and 16,800 kg/37,037 lb MTOW, to the Royal Australian Air Force to meet Project Air 5190 tactical airlift requirement, but was forced by financial constraints to withdraw in 1998.

CN-235 MPA
Maritime patrol version with 6 hardpoints to carry AM-39 Exocet missiles or Mk.46 torpedoes.

CN-235 ASW
Anti-submarine warfare variant, developed by Turkish Aerospace and Indonesian Aerospace

HC-144 Ocean Sentry
United States Coast Guard designation for a planned twenty-two aircraft fleet bought to replace the small HU-25 Guardian business-style jets. As of 2019, eighteen had been delivered.

AC-235
A light gunship modified with integrated weapons pylons to carry AGM-114 Hellfire missiles and 70 mm rockets; it also has a side-mounted 30 mm cannon and a Synthetic aperture radar.

== Operators ==
=== Military operators ===
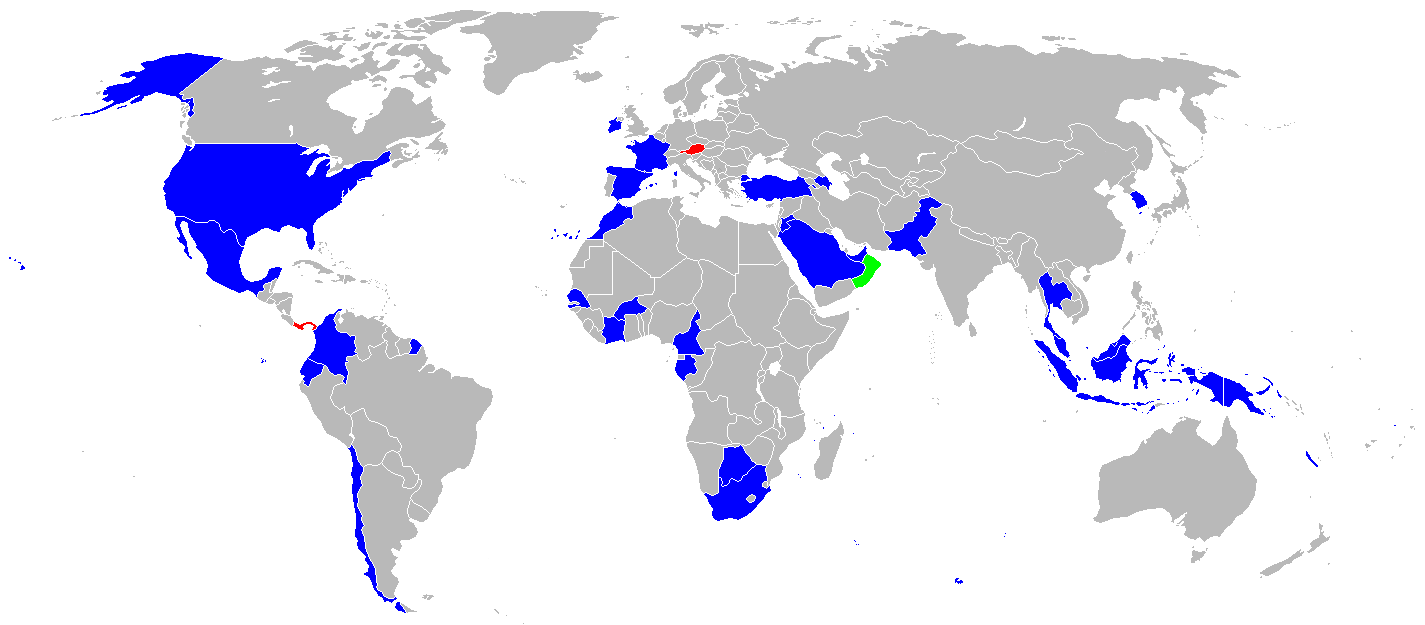
CN235 world operators: Military operators Only government operators Former operators

Azerbaijan

- Azerbaijani Air and Air Defence Force and Azerbaijani Navy operates four CN235.

Botswana

- The Botswana Defence Force Air Wing operates two CN235 aircraft.

Brunei

- The Royal Brunei Air Force operates one CN235-110M.

Burkina Faso

- The Military of Burkina Faso operates one CN235.

Cameroon

- Cameroon Air Force ordered one CN235 in June 2012, delivery took place in July 2013.

Chile

- The Chilean Army operates three CN235.

Colombia

- The Colombian Aerospace Force and the Colombian National Navy operate a total of five CN235 aircraft.

Ecuador

- The Ecuadorian Army and Ecuadorian Navy operate four CN235s.

France

- The French Air and Space Force operates 27 aircraft.

Gabon

- The Gabonese Air Force operates one CN235.

Indonesia

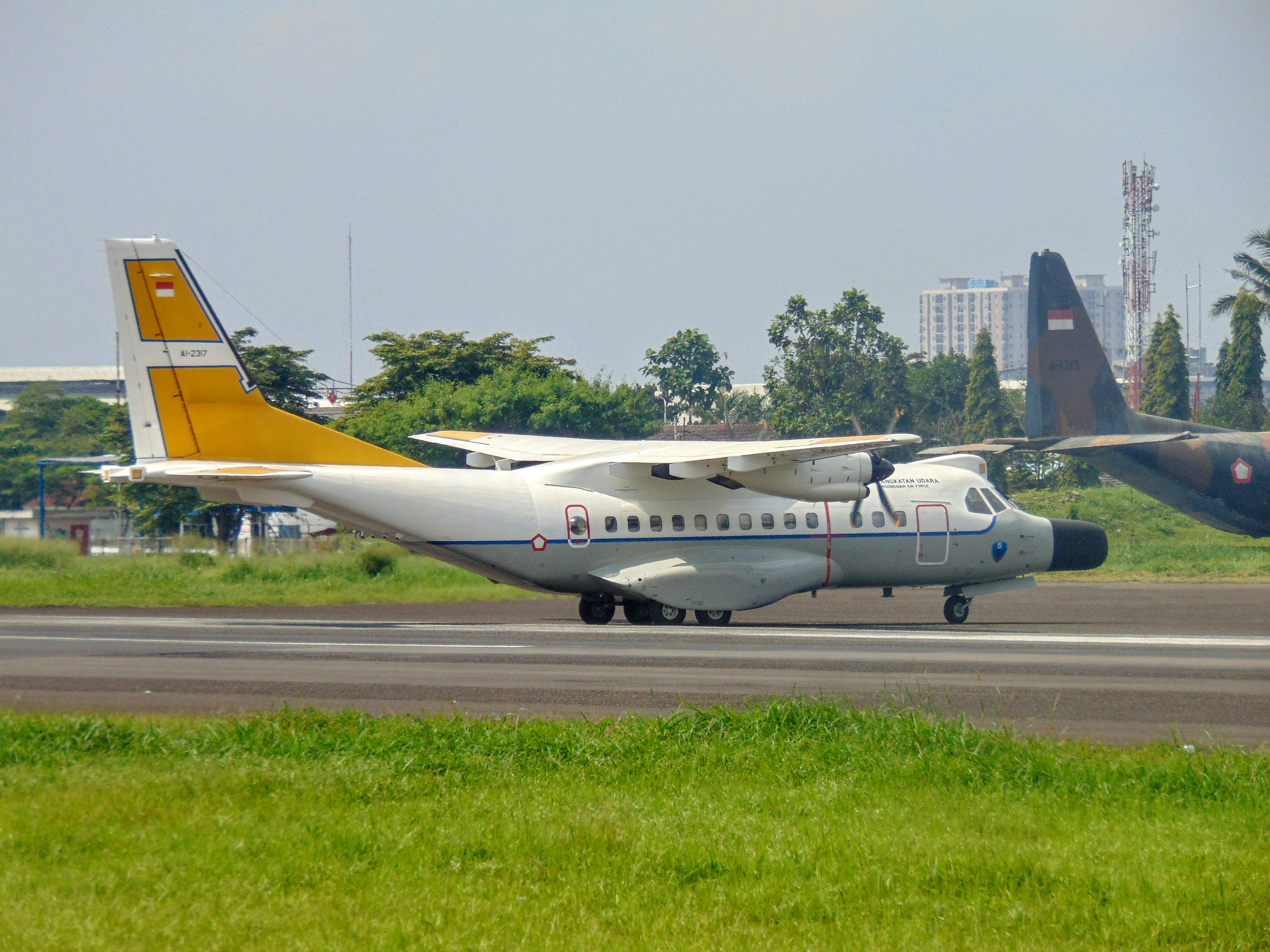
A CASA CN235-MPA of the Indonesian Air Force

- The Indonesian Air Force operates the CN235 and Indonesian Navy operates the CN235-MPA; as 2018, eight CN235 in service with the air force and five CN235 in service with the navy.

Malaysia

- The Royal Malaysian Air Force operates seven CN235s following the accidental loss of one aircraft in 2016.

Mauritania

- One CN235 delivered from the United Arab Emirates in May 2019.

Mexico

- The Mexican Navy operates eight CN235-300MPA, the first two were delivered in September 2010.

Morocco

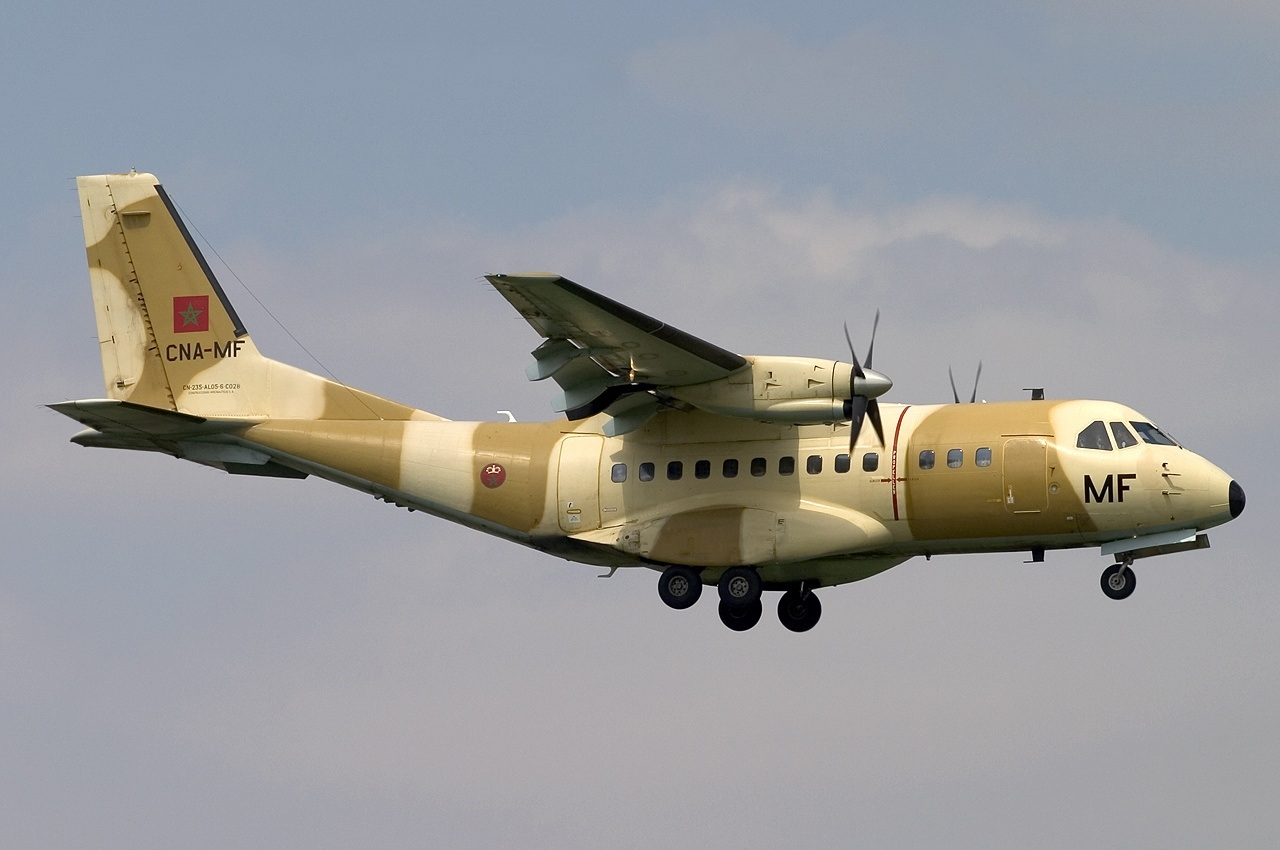
A Royal Moroccan Air Force's CN235-100M

- The Moroccan Air Force operates five aircraft.

Nepal

- The Nepalese Army's Aviation Brigade signed a deal on 16 June 2017 to purchase its first CN235-220, and began negotiations in February 2018 to purchase a second from Indonesian Aerospace.

Oman

- Royal Oman Police

Pakistan

- The Pakistan Air Force operates four CN235-220 aircraft in the transport role.

Papua New Guinea

- The Papua New Guinea Defence Force Air Operations Element operate one aircraft.

Saudi Arabia

- The Royal Saudi Air Force operates four CN235-10M, two of which are used for VIP purposes.

Senegal

- The Senegalese Air Force operates three aircraft.

Republic of Korea

- The Republic of Korea Air Force operates twenty airframes; twelve built by CASA in Spain and eight by IPTN in Indonesia
- The Korean Coast Guard operates four aircraft.

Spain

- The Spanish Air and Space Force operates eighteen aircraft.
- The Spanish Civil Guard operates five aircraft for surveillance duties.

Turkey

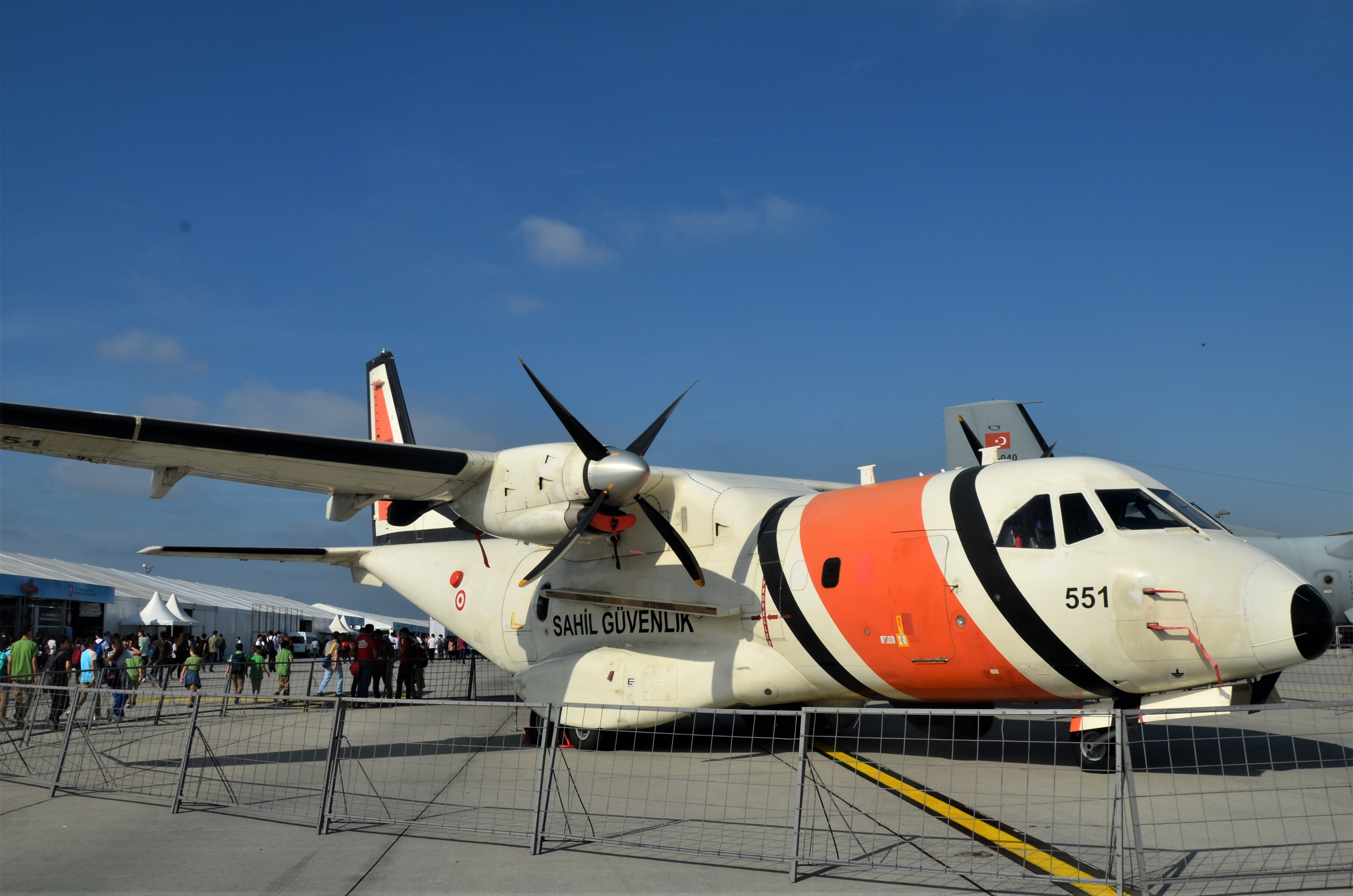
CASA-IPTN CN235 Turkish Coast Guard

- The Turkish Army, Turkish Air Force, Turkish Navy, and Turkish Coast Guard operate fifty-nine aircraft. Produced under license by TAI.

United Arab Emirates

- The Military of the United Arab Emirates operates six aircraft.

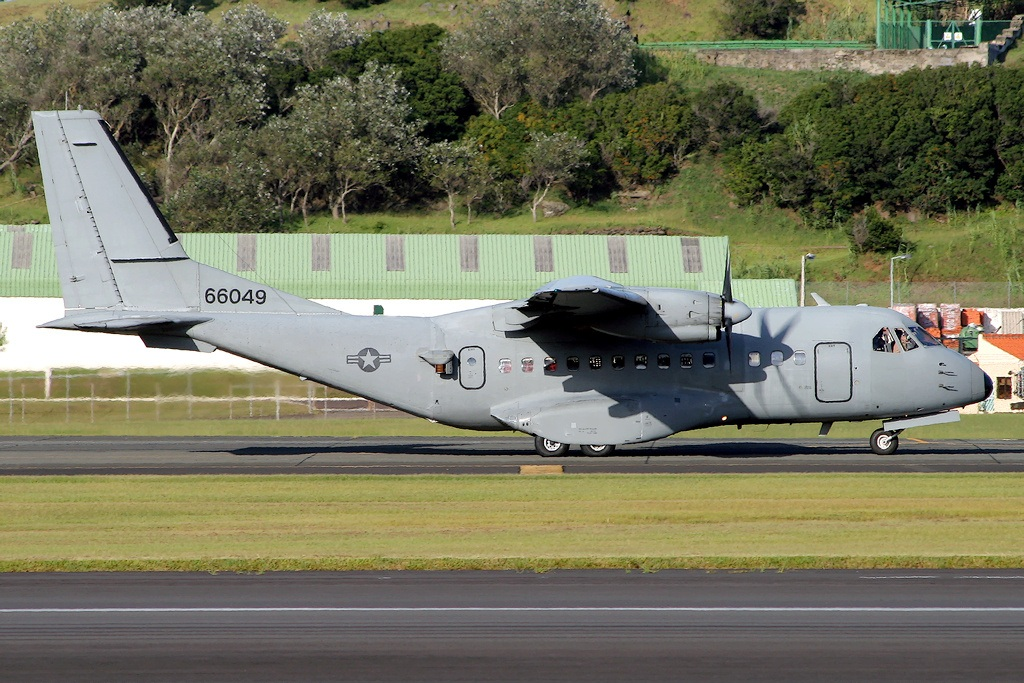
US Air Force CN235-100M QC

United States

- The United States Air Force operates thirteen aircraft.
- The United States Coast Guard operates eighteen aircraft – see EADS CASA HC-144 Ocean Sentry.

=== Former military operators ===
Austria

- Austrian Air Force

Bophuthatswana

- Bophuthatswana Air Force (1, incorporated into South African Air Force)

Ireland

- The Irish Air Corps operated two CN235-100 employed as maritime patrol aircraft, delivery took place in 1994 with both being retired in 2024

Jordan

- The Royal Jordanian Air Force operated two AC-235 gunships, as of December 2018 they are both listed for sale.

Madagascar

- The Malagasy Air Force received a single CN235 that was formerly operated by the Botswana Defence Force in June 2019; it was seized by the supplier Sofema at Johannesburg in November 2020 owing to a failure of Madagascar to keep up payments for the aircraft.

Panama

- Panamanian Air Force / National Air Service (until 1995)

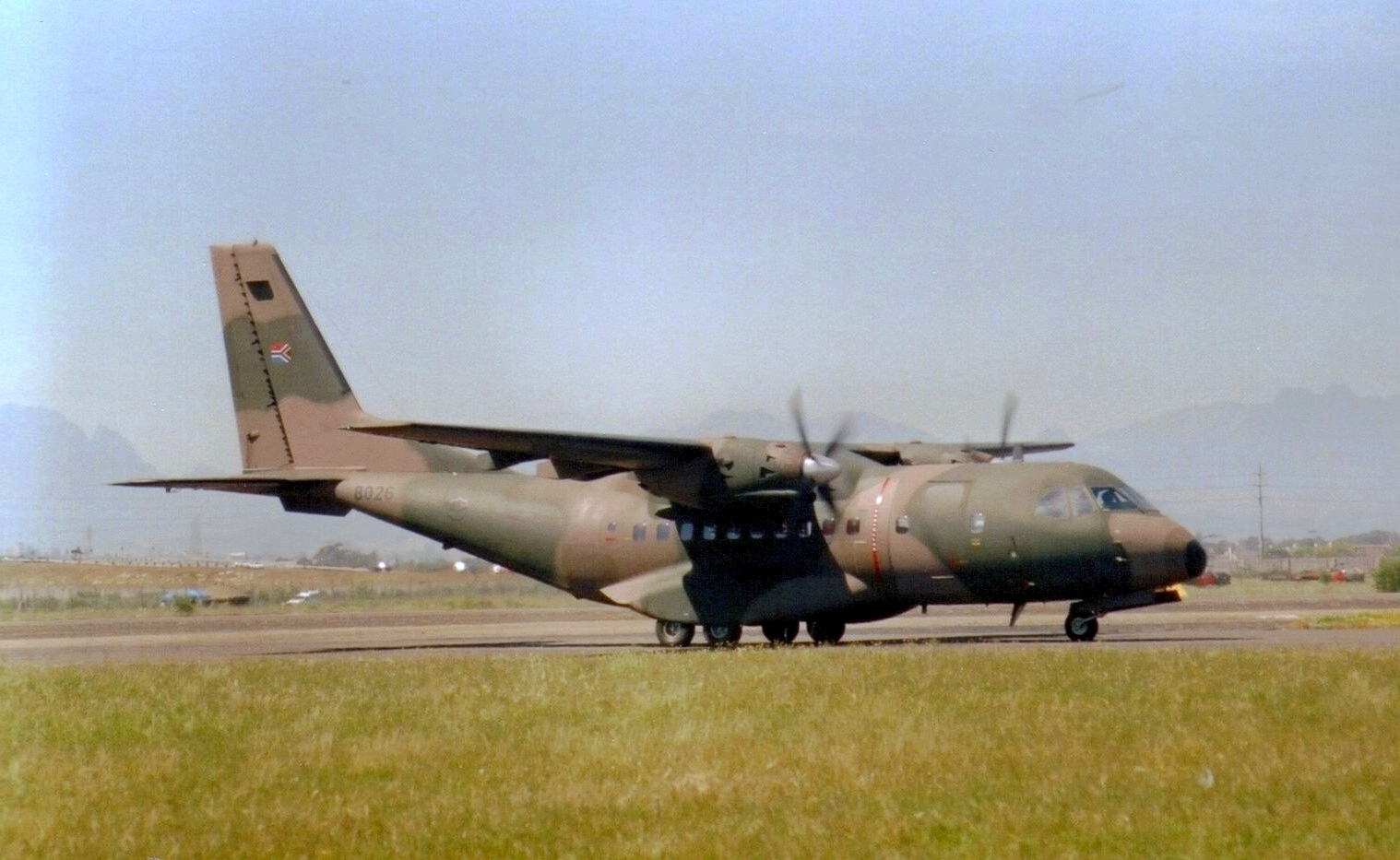
SAAF CN-235 in 2006

South Africa

- South African Air Force (from Bophuthatswana Air Force, retired in late 2011)

Yemen

- Yemen Air Force (1x CN235-300) The only aircraft of the type, registration number 2211, factory number 168988, serial number 188, was destroyed in a Saudi airstrike on 25 March 2015.

=== Government and paramilitary operators ===
Mexico

- National Guard (2x CN235)

Oman

- Royal Oman Police (2x CN235-M100)

Spain

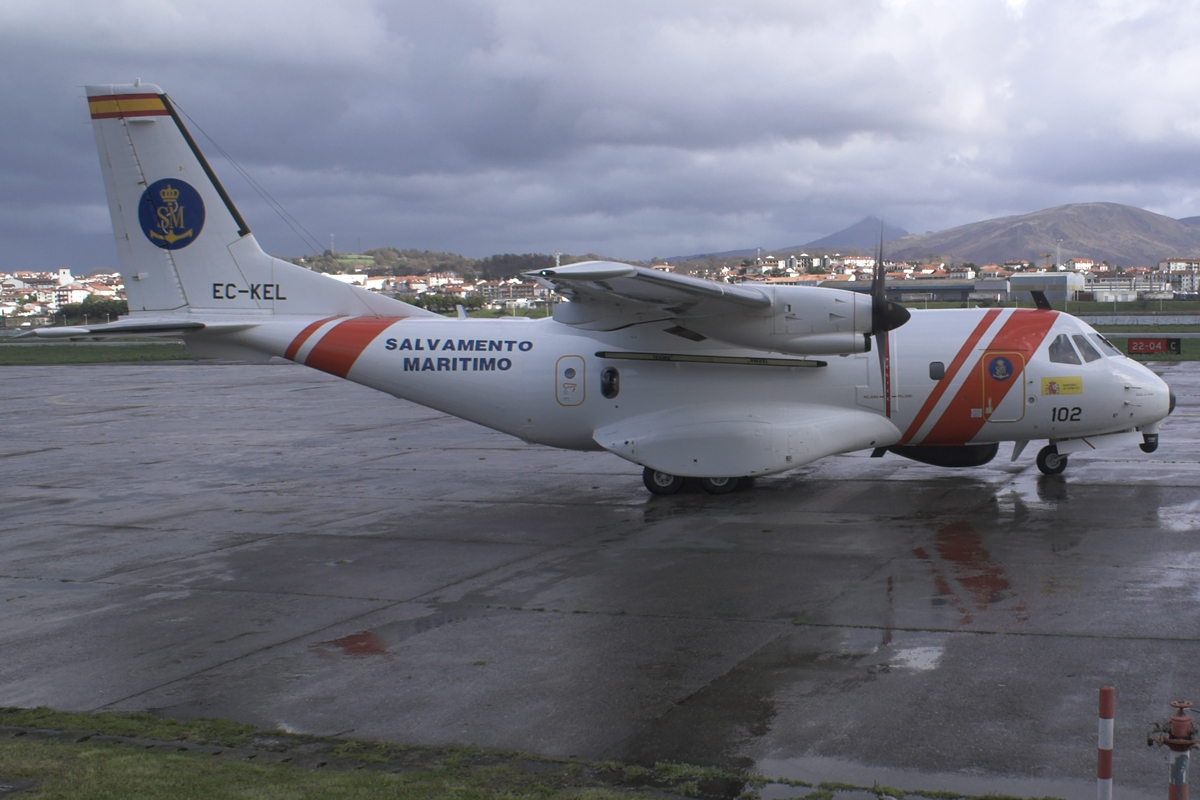
A CASA CN235-300 MPA of the Spanish Maritime Safety Agency

- Sociedad de Salvamento y Seguridad Marítima (Spanish Maritime Safety Agency) (3x CN235-MPA)

Thailand

- Royal Thai Police (2x CN235-200,220)

=== Civil operators ===
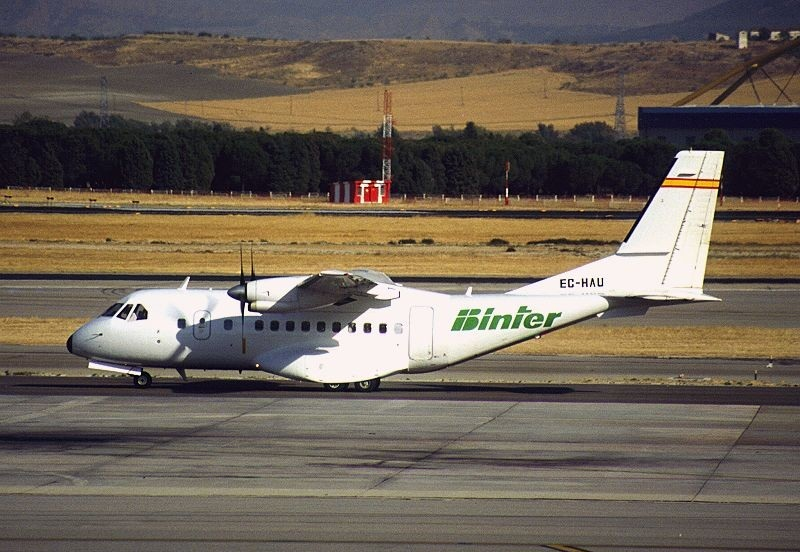
Binter Mediterraneo CN235

Argentina

- Inter Austral airlines, a subsidiary of Austral Líneas Aéreas, was later integrated into Aerolíneas Argentinas, one ex-Binter.

Indonesia

- Merpati Nusantara Airlines once operated fifteen CN235s

Madagascar

- Tiko Air had one (C012)

Namibia

- Air Namibia operated one from 2001 to 2006

South Africa

- Safair had two CN235s, sold in 2006 and 2008

Spain

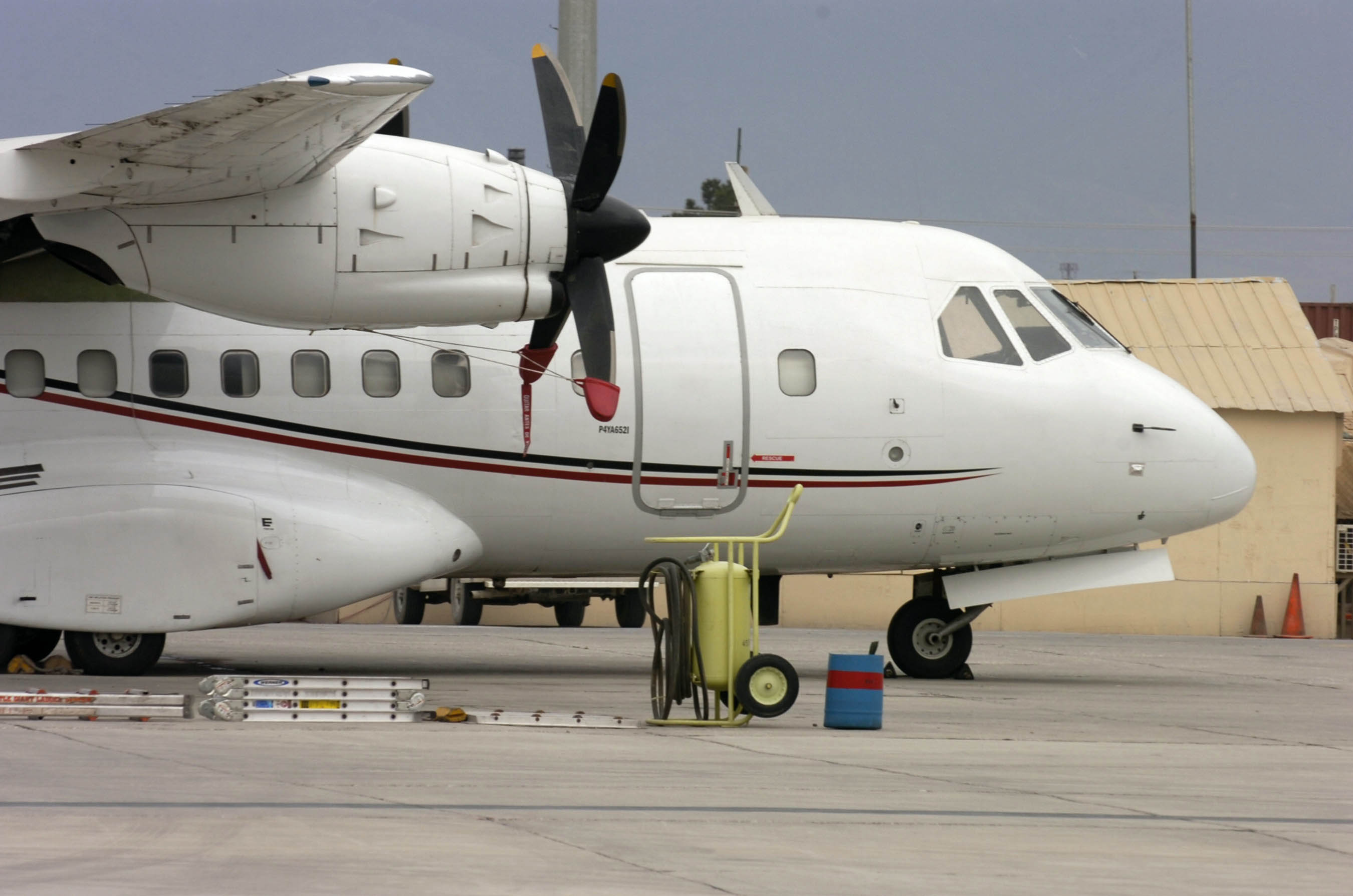
Presidential Airways CN235, formerly belonging to Binter Mediterráneo.

- Binter Canarias and Binter Mediterraneo, both then subsidiaries of Iberia, operated four and five respectively from 1989 to 1997

United States

- Prescott Support Company Inc, operating two CASA CN235
- Flight International and Flight Turbo AC with one each
- L-3 Communication Systems acquired two aircraft
- Presidential Airways, operates one former Binter Canarias

Venezuela

- Air Venezuela had two (1999–2001)

== Notable accidents ==
On 18 October 1992, Merpati Nusantara Airlines (Registration PK-MNN) CN-235-10 Flight 5601 crashed in Garut, Indonesia, killing all 31 people on board,

On 9 August 1995, Inter Austral Flight 2306 (Registration LV-VHM) had its rear door opened mid-flight, ejecting a flight attendant; the other 28 occupants survived and the plane returned safely.

On 19 January 2001, a Turkish Air Force CN-235 training mission crashed near Kayseri after entering a spin from which recovery was not possible, killing all three people on board.

On 16 May 2001, a Turkish Air Force CN-235 crashed after the pilot lost control, killing all 34 people on board.

On 18 May 2001, a Turkish Navy CN-235 crashed after the pilot lost control after reaching an altitude of just 100 feet, killing all 4 people on board.

On 29 August 2001, Binter Mediterráneo Flight 8261 (Registration EC-FBC) crash-landed at Málaga, Spain, killing four of the 47 passengers and crew aboard. The aircraft was scrapped.

On 11 February 2013, a CN-235 crashed into a forest 45 km south of Monrovia, Liberia, 8 km to Roberts International Airport, killing 11 people amongst them Souleymane Kelefa Diallo, Guinea army chief.

On 1 August 2015 a CN-235-200M operated by the Colombian Air Force crashed in Cesar province, Colombia due to engine failure, killing 11 people.

On 26 February 2016, a CN-235 operated by the Royal Malaysian Air Force crashed in a swamp in Kuala Selangor. Although there were no casualties amongst the occupants, a local fisherman drowned during the rescue effort.

On 17 January 2018, a Turkish Air Force CN-235 on a training mission crashed with two pilots and a technician on board near Isparta. All on board were killed.

== Aircraft on display ==
- PK-XNC (cn: P2) on display at Indonesian Aerospace facility in Husein Sastranegara Airport, Bandung, West Java. This was one of three CN235 prototypes and was used as flying test bed by the Indonesian Aerospace.
- SAAF 8026 (cn: P3) South African Air Force on display at the South African Air Force Museum AFB Swartkop, Pretoria. This was one of three CN235 prototypes and served with the Bophutatswana Air Force before service with the SAAF.
- A complete fuselage of a CN235 is on display at Indonesian Aerospace facility in Husein Sastranegara Airport, Bandung, West Java.

== Specifications (CN235) ==

Data from Airbus Military

General characteristics

- Crew: two, pilot and co-pilot
- Capacity: 51 passengers, 35 paratroops, 18 stretchers or four HCU-6/E pallets including one on the ramp and 6,000 kg (13,100 lb)
- Length: 21.40 m (70 ft 2.5 in)
- Wingspan: 25.81 m (84 ft 8 in)
- Height: 8.18 m (26 ft 10 in)
- Wing area: 59.10 m^{2} (636.1 sq ft)
- Aspect ratio: 11.27:1
- Airfoil: NACA 65_{3}-218
- Empty weight: 9,800 kg (21,605 lb)
- Max takeoff weight: 16,100 kg (35,420 lb)
- Fuel capacity: 4150 kg
- Powerplant: 2 × General Electric CT7-9C3 turboprops, 1,305 kW (1,750 hp) each (take-off)
- Propellers: 4-bladed Hamilton Sundstrand 14RF Propeller

Performance

- Cruise speed: 450 km/h (286 mph, 248 kn) at 4,575 m (15,000 ft)
- Stall speed: 156 km/h (97 mph, 84 kn) (flaps down)
- Range: 4,355 km (2,706 mi, 2,350 nmi)
- Service ceiling: 9,100 m (30,000 ft)
- Rate of climb: 7.8 m/s (1,780 ft/min)

== See also ==
Related development

- EADS HC-144 Ocean Sentry
- EADS CASA C-295
- Indonesian Aerospace N245

Aircraft of comparable role, configuration, and era

- Alenia C-27J Spartan
- Antonov An-32
- CASA C-295

== Sources ==
- Hoyle, Craig. "World Air Forces Directory". Flight International, Vol. 182 No. 5370. 11–17 December 2012. pp. 40–64.
- Lambert, Mark. Jane's All The World's Aircraft 1993–1994. Coulsden, UK:Jane's Data Division, 1993. ISBN 0-7106-1066-1.
