= Indonesian Aerospace N245 =

Utility aircraft under development

N245
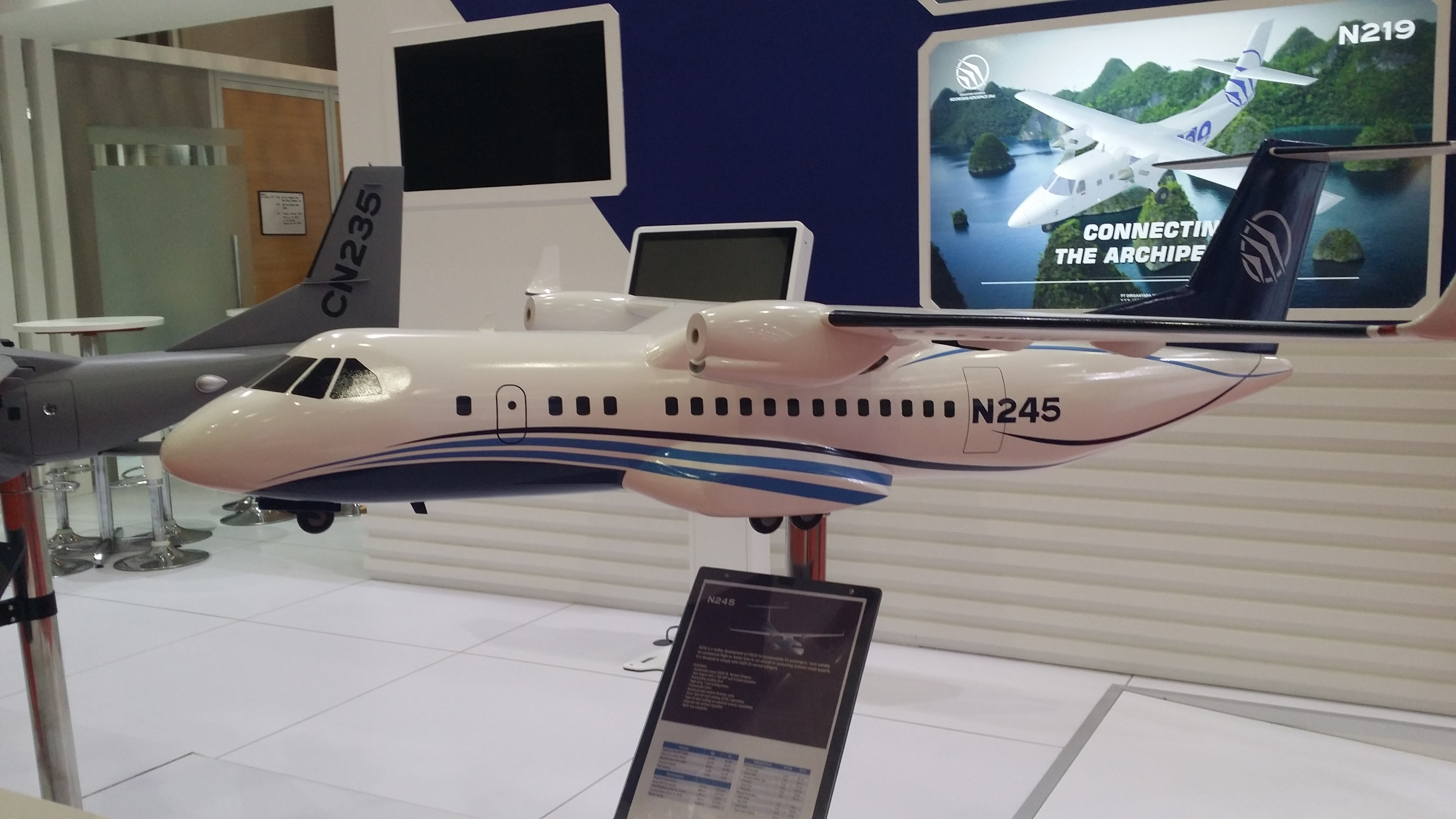
- Model of Indonesian Aerospace N245

General information
- Type: Light utility transport
- Manufacturer: Indonesian Aerospace
- Status: Under development

History
- Developed from: CASA/IPTN CN-235

Indonesian Aerospace N245 is an Indonesian turboprop airliner being developed by Indonesian Aerospace. A refinement of the CASA/IPTN CN-235, the N245 is designed for greater passenger capacity and lower operating costs than the CN-235. The N245 has a longer body, and a newer engine type, a T-tail and no ramp door.

== Design and development ==
When President Joko Widodo took office on 20 October 2014, he ordered the revival of several Indonesian aircraft in order to boost the Indonesian economy, including the N250, which had been cancelled in 1998. After the successful revival of the N219 aircraft, Indonesian Aerospace decided to make an improved and larger aircraft, and chose the N245, a 50-seat turboprop airliner, as the N219's successor. The airliner was named N245 for "the spirit of '45", after the year Indonesia's independence of 1945. The program to produce the N245 began in 2016. Indonesian Aerospace also stated its intention to produce the N270, the 70-seat version of the N245 and the N219.

The design phase was slated to begin in 2017 and the first N245 was to be done by 2020. The Indonesian government pledged to provide a total of $44 million to develop the aircraft.

On 8 December 2016, the Indonesian Ministry of Industry opined that the N245 and the RAI R80 (another turboprop aircraft to be built by Indonesian Aerospace, which is developed from the N250) should be designated as Strategic National Projects. On 10 February 2017, the N245 and the R80 were added to the project list. Due to this decision, the government was to prioritize the development of both aircraft, and accelerate the production timetable, saying that both aircraft could make a first flight as soon as 2019.

In July 2017, Indonesian Aerospace announced that it had entered into an agreement with Turkish Aerospace Industries (TAI) to collaborate in the development of N245 and N219. Under a Framework Agreement, the two organizations would work together on technical aspects as well marketing initiatives. The collaboration is expected to facilitate the conversion of the N245 from an aircraft designed for lightweight transport into a cost-effective commuter airplane. Initial report cited TAI's involvement in the conceptual design activities of the N245.

== See also ==
- CASA/IPTN CN-235
- IPTN N250
- Infoglobal I-22 Sikatan
