= Kelefa Diallo =

Guinean army chief (1959–2013)

General Souleymane Kelefa Diallo (December 2, 1959 - February 11, 2013) was chief of staff of the Guinean Army. Born to Elhadj Kelefa Diallo and Fatoumata Diakité. He was a graduate of the University of Conakry and an army school in Thies, Senegal. He and several military officials were killed on February 11, 2013, when their CASA 235 crashed near the town of Charlesville, near Harbel, Liberia, about 8 kilometers away from Roberts International Airport. At his funeral, which took place at the Palais du Peuple he was decorated by the President Alpha Condé. Diallo was one of the leaders who had seized power in Guinea in 2008.
