= EADS HC-144 Ocean Sentry =

Maritime patrol and air-sea rescue aircraft

CASA - EADS HC-144 Ocean Sentry
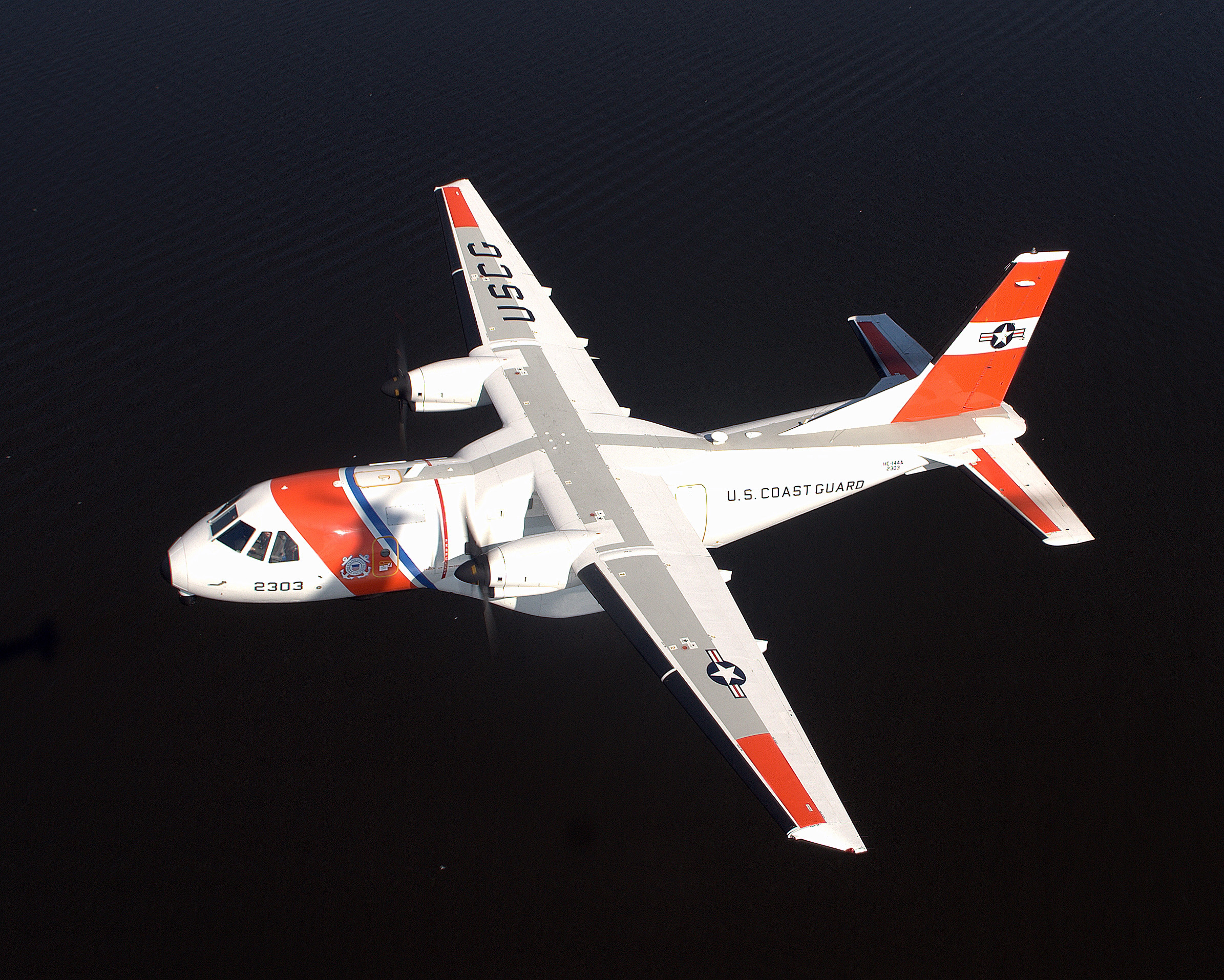

General information
- Type: Search-and-rescue aircraft
- National origin: Spain
- Manufacturer: Airbus Military (prime contractor EADS North America) CASA
- Status: In active service
- Primary user: United States Coast Guard
- Number built: 18

History
- Introduction date: 2009
- Developed from: CASA/IPTN CN-235

The EADS HC-144 Ocean Sentry is a medium-range, twin-engined turboprop aircraft used by the United States Coast Guard in the search-and-rescue and maritime patrol missions. Based on the CASA CN-235, it was procured as a "Medium Range Surveillance Aircraft." The HC-144 is supplied by Airbus Group, Inc, formerly EADS North America, and is built in Spain by CASA.

== Design and development ==
Intended to replace the Dassault HU-25 Guardian jet, the HC-144A Ocean Sentry is part of the Coast Guard's Integrated Deepwater System Program of recapitalization and new-asset acquisition. Based on the CN-235-300 MP Persuader, the maritime patrol version of the CN-235 military transport, the HC-144 offers a longer endurance than the HU-25 it is replacing in U.S. Coast Guard service, as well as better performance in the low-level observation role.

The HC-144A has an eight-hour endurance, which makes it suited for the command and control and search and rescue roles. Its rear ramp provides for transport of standard cargo pallets. It also features short takeoff and landing capability.

=== Systems ===
The HC-144A uses electronic systems on the Mission System Pallet roll-on, roll-off electronics suite from Lockheed Martin, that connects to the aircraft's systems upon installation. The HC-144A's equipment is similar to the Coast Guard's HC-130 aircraft, which reduces maintenance and training costs.

== Operational history ==
The first HC-144 was delivered to the U.S. Coast Guard in December 2006. Initial Operational Capability (IOC) was achieved in April 2009; thirteen Ocean Sentry aircraft were operational with the Coast Guard in January 2011. A total of 36 aircraft were planned to be procured, with twelve Mission System Pallets being swapped between the operational aircraft.

The HC-144A has been involved in several missions during its career, including involvement in the Marquis Cooper search-and-rescue mission, the response to the 2010 Haiti earthquake, environmental missions monitoring the Deepwater Horizon oil spill, transporting endangered marine animals for rehabilitation, and being involved with Hurricane Sandy relief efforts. In June 2014, the Coast Guard's fleet of 17 HC-144s reached 50,000 flight hours, five years after achieving IOC. The Ocean Sentry is flown more hours per airframe in a year than any other Coast Guard aircraft.

The 15th HC-144 was delivered in June 2013. The Coast Guard was considering supplementing the HC-144 with former Air Force C-27J Spartan aircraft. Budget strains have caused the service to reconsider acquiring a 36-plane fleet. Cancelling the remaining 18 to be manufactured and replacing them with up to 14 decommissioned C-27Js would save between $500–$800 million. Converting the Spartans to search-and-rescue aircraft would be faster and cheaper than funding and delivery of the full order. EADS responded by stating that the HC-144 is half as expensive to maintain and operate compared to the C-27J in terms of direct maintenance and fuel costs, calling into question the idea as a cost-saving measure. With the signing of the U.S. Defense Authorization Bill for Fiscal Year 2014 on 26 December 2013, the Coast Guard was given control of the 14 remaining C-27Js available. The 16th HC-144 was delivered on 22 January 2014, the 17th on 7 April 2014, and the 18th and final HC-144A was delivered on 7 October 2014.

On 22 September 2017, a ceremony was held in Mobile, Alabama where Airbus and the Coast Guard celebrated the crafts' 100,000th hour of operation in service. The Coast Guard is only the third aircraft operator to reach 100,000 hours on this type aircraft, and the fastest to do so (only 8 years). Estimates are the type will reach 200,000 hours in Coast Guard service by 2022.

The Coast Guard is upgrading its 18 HC-144As to HC-144Bs intending to improve mission effectiveness and situational awareness through the Ocean Sentry Refresh project. The aircraft will receive a new cockpit control and display unit, used in flight management as the primary avionics computer for communication control, navigation and equipment monitoring.

== Specifications ==
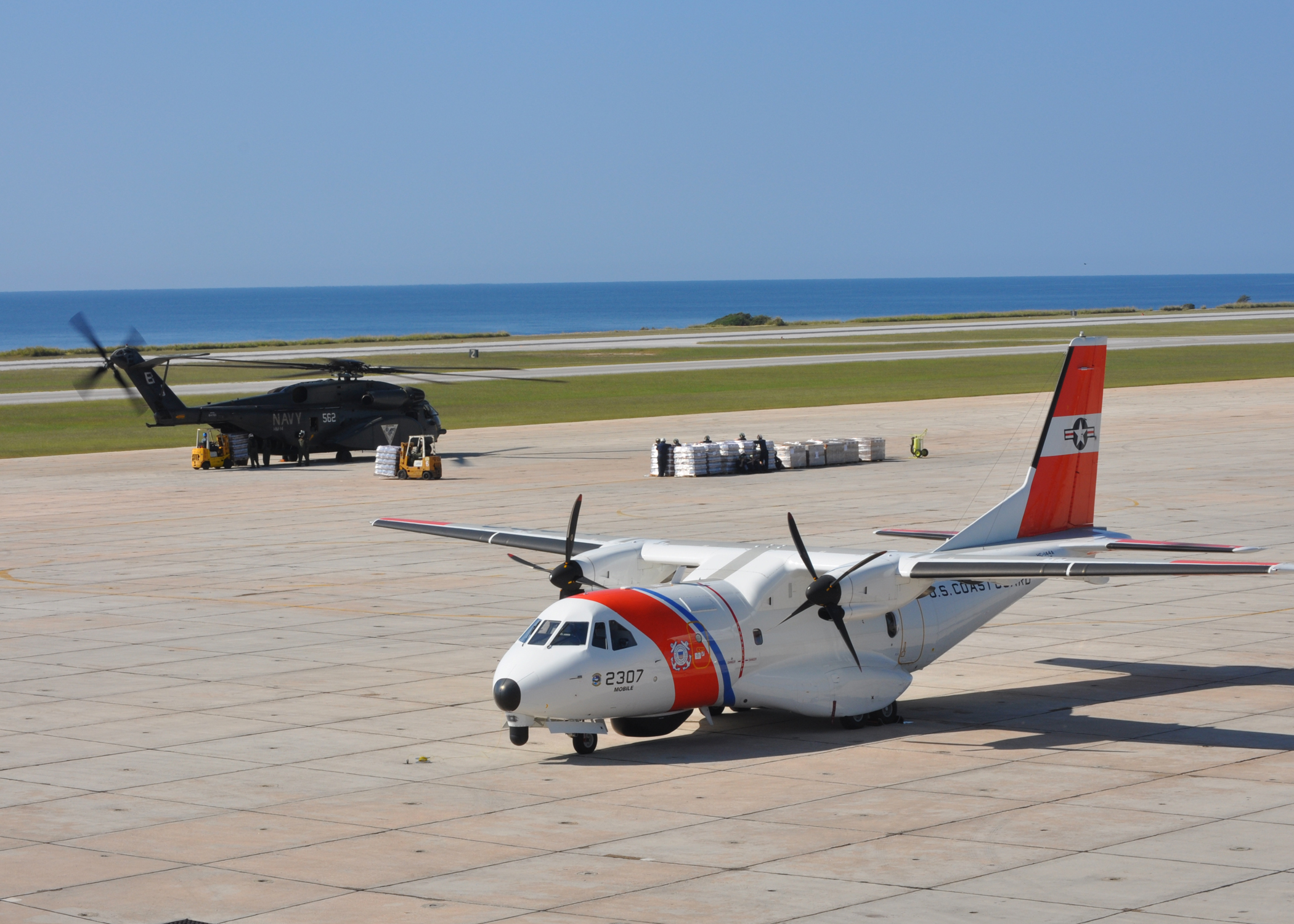
An HC-144A and U.S. Navy MH-53E at Guantanamo Bay, Cuba

Data from

General characteristics

- Crew: six
- Length: 70 ft 3 in (21.41 m)
- Wingspan: 84 ft 8 in (25.81 m)
- Height: 26 ft 10 in (8.18 m)
- Wing area: 636 sq ft (59.1 m^{2})
- Empty weight: 21,605 lb (9,800 kg)
- Max takeoff weight: 36,380 lb (16,502 kg)
- Powerplant: 2 × General Electric CT7 turboprop, 1,870 shp (1,390 kW) each

Performance

- Maximum speed: 272 mph (437 km/h, 236 kn)
- Range: 1,801 mi (2,898 km, 1,565 nmi)
- Endurance: 8.7 hours

== See also ==
Related development

- CASA/IPTN CN-235
- CASA C-295

Aircraft of comparable role, configuration, and era

- Alenia HC-27J Spartan
