= Kemayoran Airport =

Airport in Jakarta, Indonesia (1940–1985)

Kemayoran Airport Bandar Udara Kemayoran

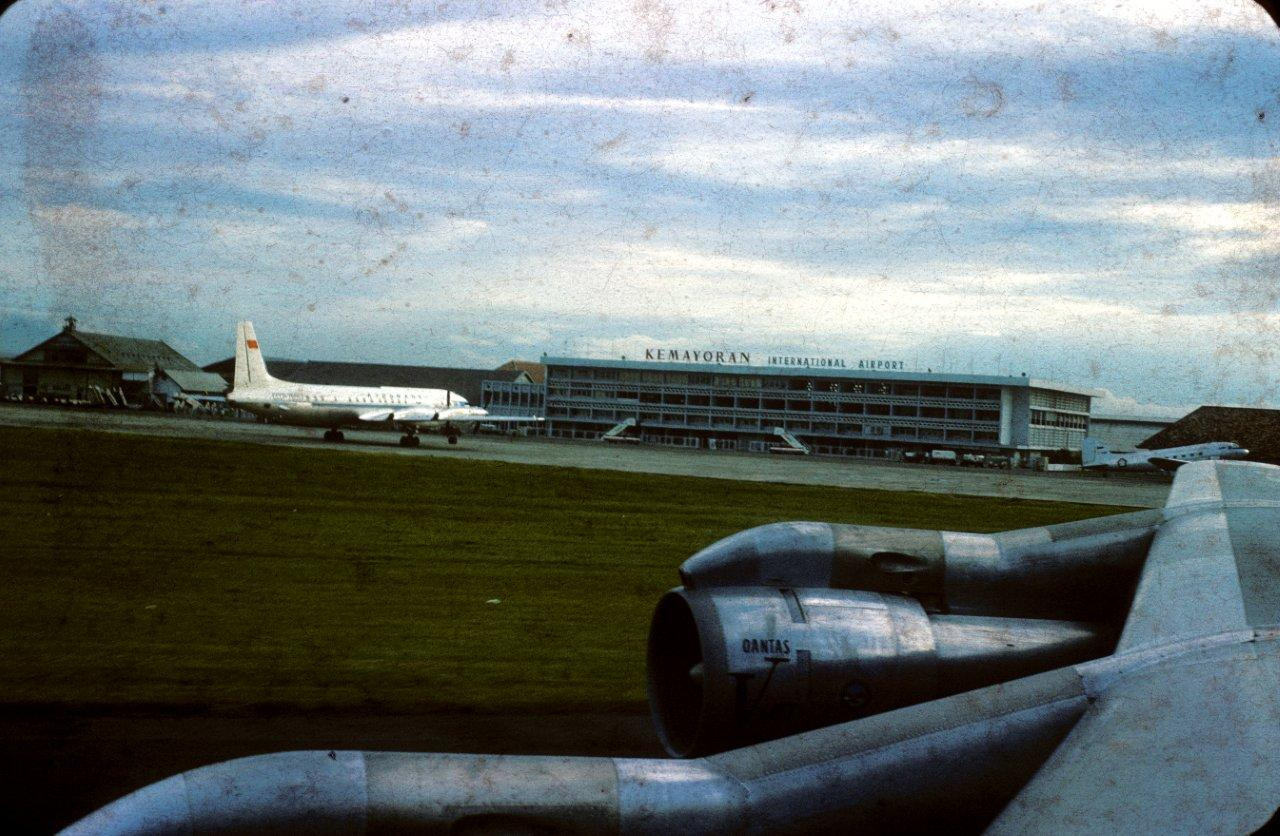
- The view of Kemayoran Airport from a Qantas Boeing 707 while an Aeroflot Ilyushin Il-18 rests at one of the terminals.
- IATA: ~~JKT~~; ICAO: ~~WIID~~

Summary
- Airport type: Defunct
- Owner: Kemayoran Planning and Development Center
- Operator: Angkasa Pura
- Serves: ~~Jakarta metropolitan area~~
- Location: Kemayoran, Central Jakarta, Indonesia
- Opened: 8 July 1940
- Closed: 31 March 1985
- Passenger services ceased: 1 October 1984
- Elevation AMSL: 12 ft (3.7 m)
- Coordinates: 06°08′50″S 106°51′00″E

Map
- Location in Jakarta, Indonesia

Runways
Direction	Length		Surface
Direction	ft	m	Surface
~~17/35~~	~~8,121~~	~~2,475~~	~~Asphalt~~ (Closed)
~~08/26~~	~~6,069~~	~~1,850~~	~~Asphalt~~ (Closed since 1976)

Kemayoran Airport ~~(IATA: JKT, ICAO: WIID)~~, also known in its old spelling as Kemajoran, was the principal airport in Jakarta, Indonesia from 1940 until 1985. Kemayoran was built during Dutch East Indies administration by the Department of Transport, Public Works and Irrigation in 1934 on the land that was formerly swamps, rice fields, and residential areas.

It was officially opened on 8 July 1940. However, the airport began operations two days earlier, on 6 July 1940, with the landing of the first aircraft, a Douglas DC-3 Dakota owned by the Royal Dutch East Indies Airways (KNILM), which had flown from Tjililitan Airfield. It was the first airport in Dutch East Indies to be opened for scheduled international flights.

During World War II, Kemayoran was used by the Royal Air Force and became RAF Kemajoran. It was one of their RAF stations in Southeast Asia until it was captured by the Japanese Imperial Army in 1942.

After Indonesia gained independence, the government under President Sukarno began upgrading terminal buildings, runways, taxiways, aprons, hangars, operational equipment and constructing a new international terminal building to accommodate foreign tourists and as part of his grand plan to beautify the capital city of Indonesia.

Due to increasing air traffic in Indonesia and Jakarta's increasingly crowded spatial layout, flights in the middle of the city started to be considered unsafe. The airport's capacity could no longer be expanded, forcing the government under President Suharto to consider constructing a new international airport with greater facilities and capacity as soon as possible. The airport was officially closed on 31 March 1985 and immediately transferred to Soekarno–Hatta International Airport.

Kemayoran previously carried the IATA airport code JKT, which is now used by airline reservation systems and travel agencies within the Jakarta metropolitan area.

The location of the former airport has been a favorite subject in urban planning. The former runways have been converted into a wide boulevard, while the green areas around it have been gradually filled with developments such as Jakarta International Exposition Center (JIExpo) and Kota Baru Bandar Kemayoran.

== Etymology ==
The name "Kemayoran" first appeared in 1816 in an advertisement in the Java Government Gazette as "the land located near Weltevreden". This land belonged to the Dutch East India Company Commander Isaac de l'Ostal de Saint-Martin (1629–1696), who was known to the locals as Mayor (Major). As a result, the locals called this area "Mayoran", which then changed over time to become "Kemayoran".

== History ==
=== Background and opening of airport ===
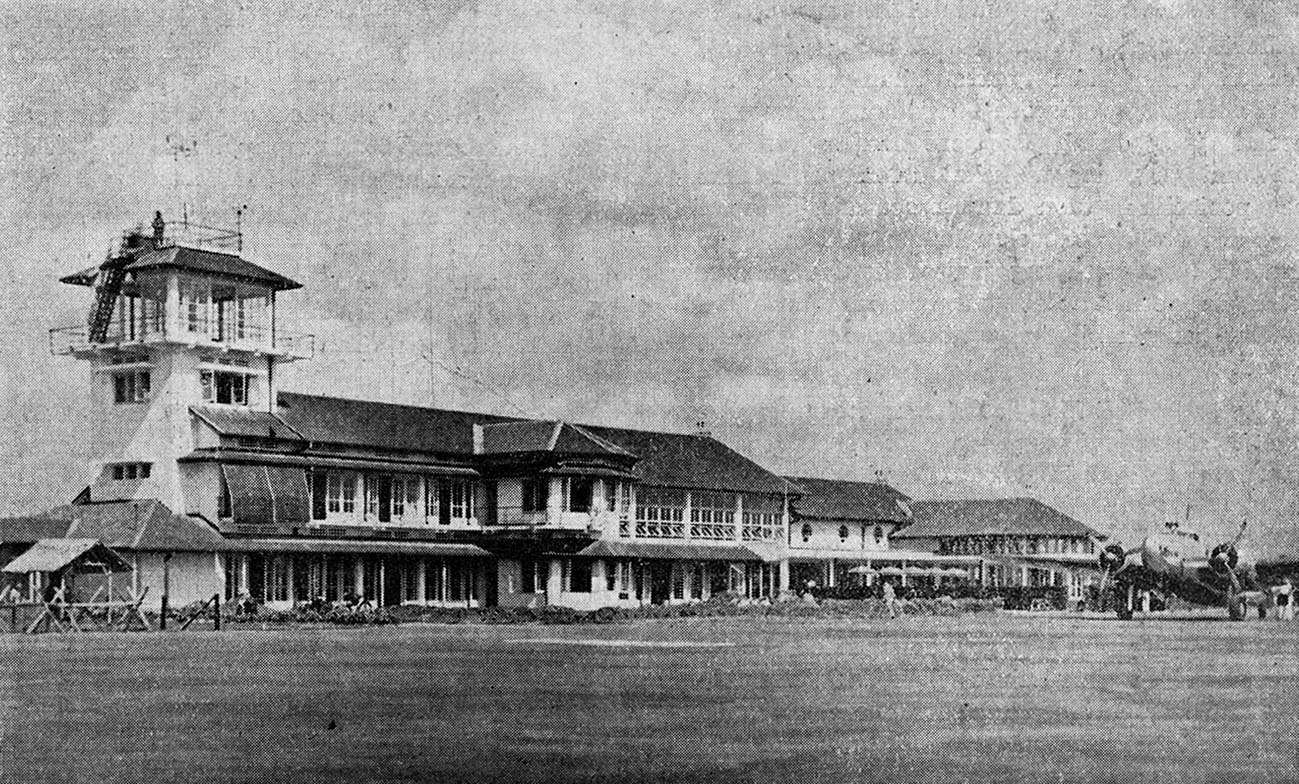
Kemayoran Airport shortly after opening in 1940

Plans to establish an international airport in Batavia were a top priority for the Dutch East Indies government. Previously, Batavia had an airfield located in Tjililitan. KLM Royal Dutch Airlines and KNILM used this airfield as the second operational base for the two airlines. However, Tjililitan Airfield was considered non-strategic because it was located on the city's outskirts and had to share ownership with the military. Therefore, to fulfill the ambition of the Dutch East Indies government, in 1934, a new airport was built in the Kemayoran area, which was still a swamp, rice fields, and settlements.

On July 6, 1940, two days before its inauguration, the first aircraft to land was a KNILM Douglas DC-3 flown from Tjililitan Airfield. The following day, a similar aircraft, a DC-3 registered PK-AJW, was also the first to depart from Kemayoran for Australia.

On Monday morning, 8 July 1940, Kemayoran was finally inaugurated by the Dutch East Indies government with the hope that it could become the main gateway to the Dutch East Indies and a source of pride for the people of Batavia. There was much enthusiasm from the people of Batavia, who were invited to the inauguration. The public could witness the world-class and modern airport facilities, which were not inferior to Schiphol Airport and other airports in Europe. Not to be missed, KNILM also showed off some of its fleet of aircraft such as the Douglas DC-2 Uiver, Douglas DC-3, Fokker F.VIIb 3m, Grumman G-21 Goose, de Havilland DH-89 Dragon Rapide, and Lockheed Model 14 Super Electra. After Kemayoran began operating, the management of this airport was held by KNILM, which was directly responsible to the Dutch East Indies government.

Coinciding with Queen Wilhelmina's birthday on August 31, 1940, the Dutch East Indies government held the first Aerospace Exhibition held in Kemayoran. In addition to KNILM aircraft, a number of private aircraft under the auspices of the Aeroclub in Batavia also participated in enlivening the event. The aircraft were the Buckmeister Bu-131 Jungmann, de Haviland DH-82 Tigermoth, Piper J-3 Cub, and Walraven 2 which had flown from Batavia to Amsterdam on 27 September 1935.

=== World War II, Japanese occupation, and post-World War II ===
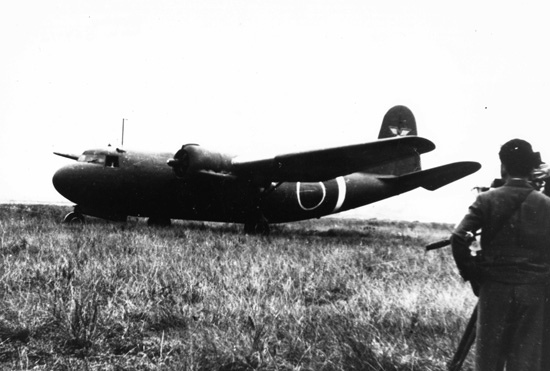
Douglas DC-5 aircraft taken over by the Imperial Japanese military in Kemayoran, between 1942-1945

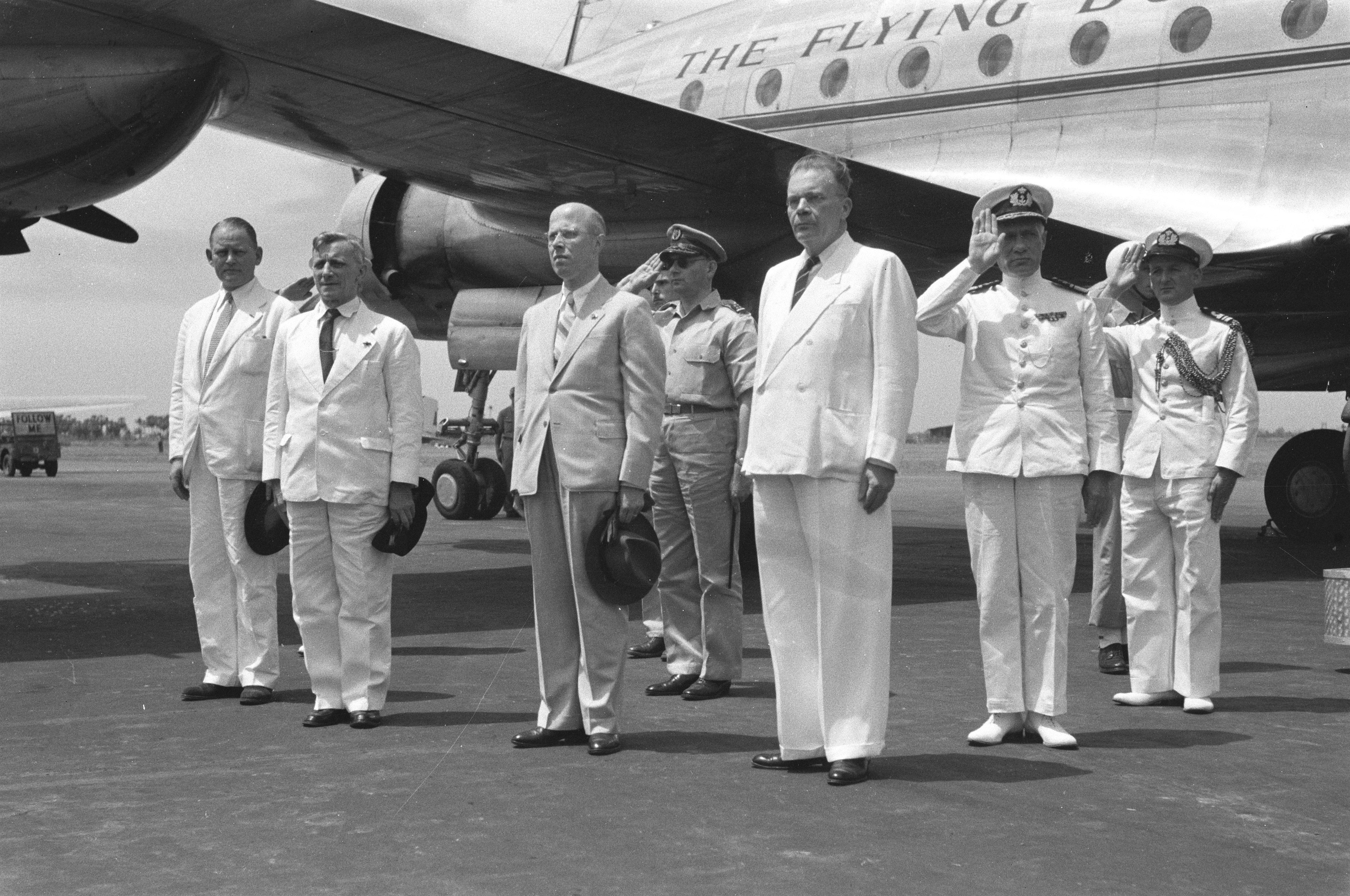
Dirk Stikker, Lambertus Neher, Louis Beel, Simon Spoor, Hubertus van Mook and Albertus Samuel Pinke arriving at Kemayoran in 1948

On 17 May 1940, Nazi Germany successfully invaded the Netherlands, forcing the Dutch government to flee to London, England. The Dutch East Indies became the most important Dutch colony in the face of Axis attacks. This event led to Kemayoran being used as a base for Allied and Dutch military aircraft, with the Royal Air Force also using it as their station. Military aircraft that stopped over at Kemayoran included the Martin B-10, Martin B-12, Koolhoven F.K.51, Brewster F2A Buffalo, Lockheed Model 18 Lodestar, Curtiss P-36 Hawk, Fokker C.X, and Boeing B-17 Flying Fortress. Kemayoran also operated as a major KLM hub, replacing Schiphol, which was then occupied by Nazi Germany.

On 9 February 1942, Kemayoran was targeted by the Imperial Japanese Navy Air Service in an attempt to capture the island of Java. In this operation, the Japanese deployed sixteen Mitsubishi A6M Zero fighter aircraft and two Mitsubishi C5M2 reconnaissance aircraft from the 22nd Cruiser Division (Dai Nijūni Kōkū sentai). The Japanese successfully shot down twelve Allied fighter aircraft and destroyed two DC-5 aircraft, two Brewster aircraft, and an F.VII aircraft on the ground. This attack also caused nine casualties with minor injuries and three fatalities. Within just one hour, Kemayoran was successfully occupied by the Japanese. This event forced KNILM to evacuate its aircraft to Australia. The first aircraft to land was a Mitsubishi A6M2b Type 0 Model 21 fighter, better known to the Allies as the "Zeke". Other Japanese aircraft that once stopped over at Kemayoran included the Showa/Nakajima L2D, Nakajima Ki-43 Hayabusa, Tachikawa Ki-9, and Tachikawa Ki-36.

On 14 August 1945, Chairul Saleh, Joesoef Ronodipoero, and other youth leaders came to pick up Sukarno, Mohammad Hatta and Rajiman Wediodiningrat at Kemayoran after their visit to meet General Hisaichi Terauchi in Da Lat, Vietnam. Upon arriving at Kemayoran, Sukarno gave a brief speech to the schoolchildren and people who had been mobilized by Hokokai and Gunseikanbu. The youths immediately approached Sukarno and asked for the proclamation to be sped up because the Japanese had been defeated in the Pacific War. However, Sukarno did not respond to the request, as he did not want to discuss independence. Not receiving a satisfactory answer, the youths then held a meeting led by Chairul Saleh at Menteng Raya 31 Building. They concluded that they would take Sukarno and Hatta to Rengasdengklok to expedite the proclamation without waiting for Japan.

After the Japanese surrender was signed on 2 September 1945, the South East Asia Command (SEAC) sent 7 Allied mission members under Major A.G. Greenhalgh's leadership to Jakarta. These seven British officers were parachuted into Kemayoran on 8 September 1945 and immediately met with General Yamaguchi, the Imperial Japanese leader in Jakarta. The result was that the Commander-in-Chief of the Imperial Japanese Army in Java issued an announcement stating that the government would be handed over to the Allies, not to Indonesia.

On 29 September 1945, Allied Forces Netherlands East Indies (AFNEI) successfully landed at Kemayoran with their troops consisting of 3 divisions to serve in Sumatra and Java. However, the arrival of the Allies in Indonesia also brought the Netherlands Indies Civil Administration (NICA), which wanted to restore Dutch colonial rule in Indonesia. At this time, Allied aircraft's turn was to come to Kemayoran, such as the Supermarine Spitfire, North American B-25 Mitchell, and North American P-51 Mustang. In addition, passenger aircraft such as the Douglas DC-4, C-54 Skymaster, Douglas DC-6, Boeing 377 Stratocruiser, and Lockheed Constellation also arrived.

On 1 August 1947, Kemayoran witnessed the birth of the KLM Interinsulair Bedrijf airline, which was later nationalized to become the first national airline in Indonesia, namely Garuda Indonesian Airways.

=== Takeover by Indonesian Government ===
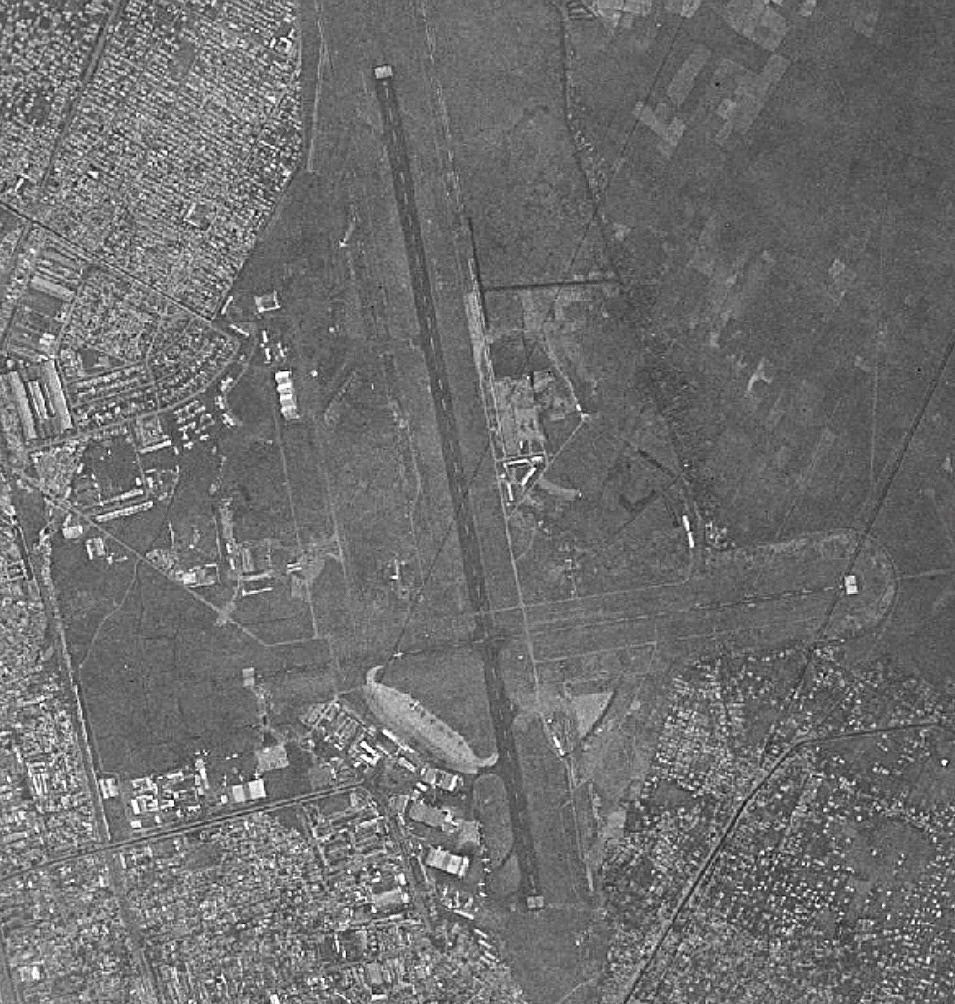
Declassified satellite imagery of Kemayoran Airfield captured by KH-7 on 15 May, 1966.

After Jakarta returned to being the capital of Indonesia, the Indonesian government directly managed civil aviation and airports. It was only in 1958 that the Djawatan Penerbangan Sipil (Civil Aviation Service), which is now better known as the Direktorat Jenderal Perhubungan Udara (Directorate General of Civil Aviation), took over.

In the 1950s, the era of modern civil aviation began with the operation of jet-engined aircraft. At that time, turboprop aircraft also arrived at Kemayoran. Among them are the Saab 91 Safir, Grumman HU-16 Albatross, Ilyushin Il-14, and Cessna, as well as aircraft made by Nurtanio Pringgoadisuryo, such as the NU-200 Si Kumbang, Belalang, and Kunang. Various world leaders have also set foot in Kemayoran, where international events such as the Asian-African Conference in 1955 were held.

The Indonesian Air Force also used Kemayoran as an airbase in addition to Halim Perdanakusuma Air Base. In the late 1950s to the early 1960s, MiG-17, MiG-15 UTI, MiG-19, MiG-21 fighter jets and Ilyushin Il-28 bombers arrived.

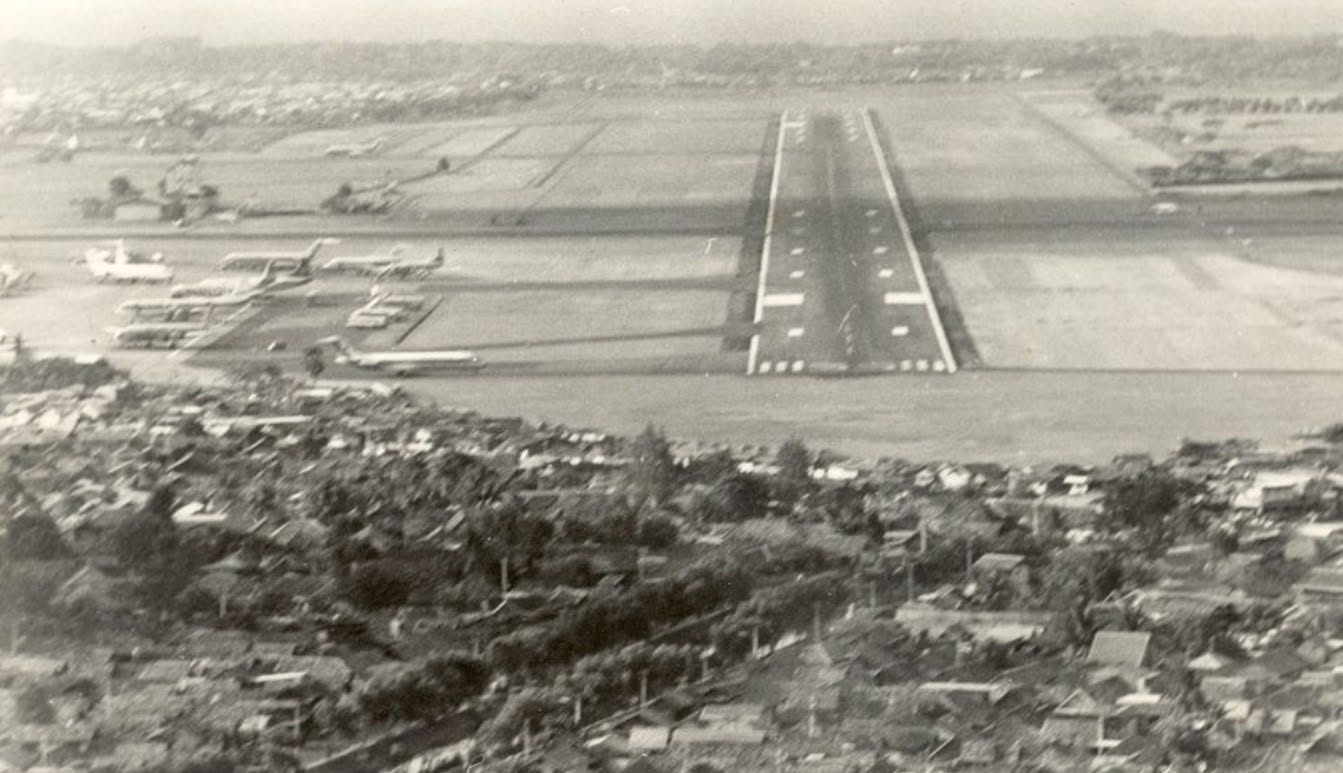
Kemayoran Airport while it was still in operation.

In the 1960s, the management of Kemayoran was transferred to a state-owned enterprise (BUMN) called Perusahaan Negara Angkasa Pura Kemayoran (Angkasa Pura State Company). The government initially invested Rp 15 million at that time. Subsequently, the government increased its investment by transferring terminal buildings, other supporting structures, runways, taxiways, aprons, hangars, and operational equipment. Perusahaan Umum Angkasa Pura (Angkasa Pura Public Company) managed the facilities until the end of its operation in 1985, after which it changed its name to reflect developments.

Entering the 1970s, the era of wide-body jets with advanced technology emerged: Boeing 747, Lockheed L-1011 TriStar, McDonnell Douglas DC-10, and Airbus A300. On 29 October 1973, a McDonnell Douglas DC-10-30 aircraft belonging to Martinair, chartered by Garuda Indonesian Airways for Hajj transportation, was recorded as the largest and heaviest aircraft ever to have stopped over at Kemayoran.

=== Overcrowding problem ===
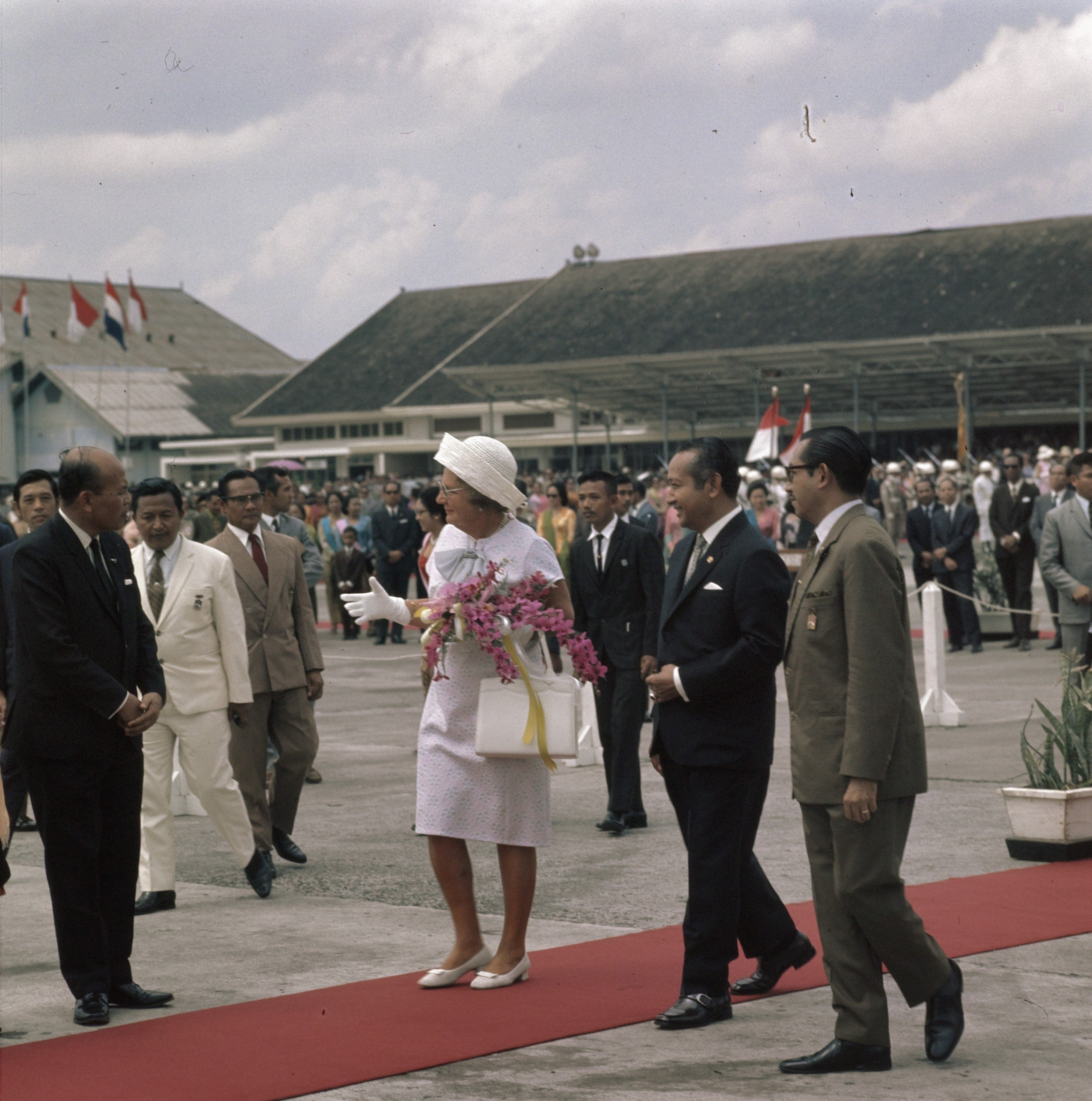
Queen Juliana of the Netherlands arriving at Kemayoran during state visit to Indonesia in 1971

The rapid growth of Jakarta's urban area also impacted the capacity of Kemayoran Airport. Its usage was close to and sometimes exceeded the designed capacity. The airport was only designed to accommodate 500-600 passengers per day. However, by the end of 1967, the number of passengers had already exceeded 1,000 per day. This number continued to increase, reaching 3,000 per day in 1973. As a result, the waiting rooms were always overcrowded and uncomfortable.

To overcome this problem, the citizens demanded that the airport be moved to Curug. However, the Minister of Transportation Sutopo rejected this idea because Curug's location was not strategic. Its facilities and infrastructure were very limited, especially for passengers going to downtown Jakarta. The choice finally fell on the eastern part of Jakarta. On 10 January 1974, President Soeharto inaugurated the operation of Halim Perdanakusuma Airport as a replacement for Kemayoran Airport's International Flights. However, all domestic flights still remain at Kemayoran.

=== Closure ===
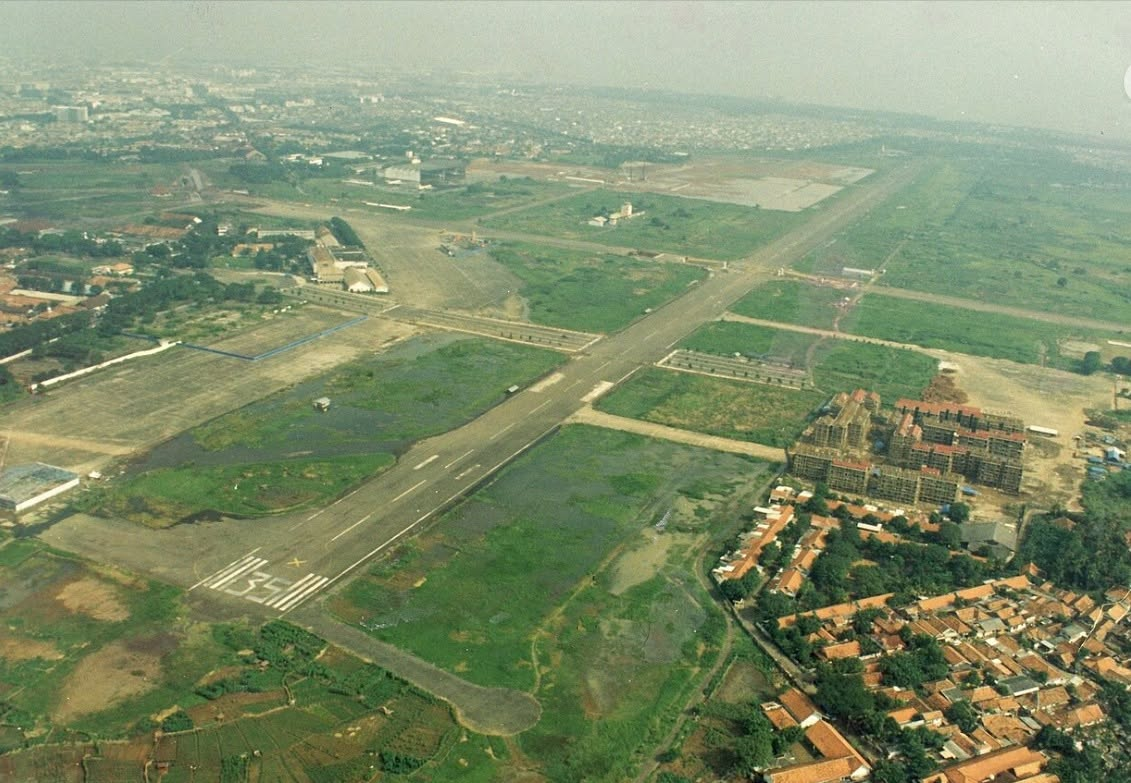
Aerial view after Kemayoran Airport was closed for flight operations.

In the mid-1970s, Kemayoran was deemed too close to the Indonesian military base, Halim Perdanakusuma. Civilian flights in the area were becoming congested, and air traffic was rapidly increasing, posing a threat to international traffic. At this time, the government decided to relocate the airport's operations to a new facility.

The plan received support from the United States Agency for International Development (USAID) in the form of funding, concept studies, and site selection. Initially, USAID studied a flat-contoured plain (200–230 meters above sea level) that was still very quiet between Ci Kahuripan-Klapanunggal and Jonggol, covering an area of 2,300 hectares, as a suitable location for the new international airport to replace Kemayoran Airport. The location is about 50 km southeast of Kemayoran Airport. The reason the Jonggol area was chosen was the need to consider the future aspects of the development of Greater Jakarta through the expansion of the reach of Jakarta's development to the outskirts of the city to prepare for the rapid physical and economic growth of Jakarta, which would certainly have an impact on the population boom in the future.

However, the Ministry of National Development Planning could not agree to USAID's proposed location, Jonggol to replace Kemayoran Airport. They argued that the area was not yet connected to other modes of transportation and was a considerable distance away. As a result, the border area between Cengkareng and North Tangerang was chosen as the location for the new airport. This location spans 1,800 hectares, which is 500 hectares smaller than the proposed USAID land area in Jonggol, Bogor.

On 1 October 1984, Angkasa Pura ceased all domestic flights at Kemayoran. During that time, passengers who had checked in at Kemayoran were immediately transported by buses to Cengkareng to board their planes. Angkasa Pura officially ceased all operational activities at Kemayoran Airport on 31 March 1985, a day before the opening of Soekarno–Hatta International Airport. The aircraft that were based at this airport were also relocated, with most being transferred to Soekarno-Hatta International Airport and the rest to Halim Perdanakusuma Airport.

After its operations were stopped, Kemayoran was used as a test flight location for aircraft made by Nusantara Aircraft Industry, CASA/IPTN CN-235, and hosted the prestigious Indonesian Air Show event in 1986.

=== Post-airport usage ===
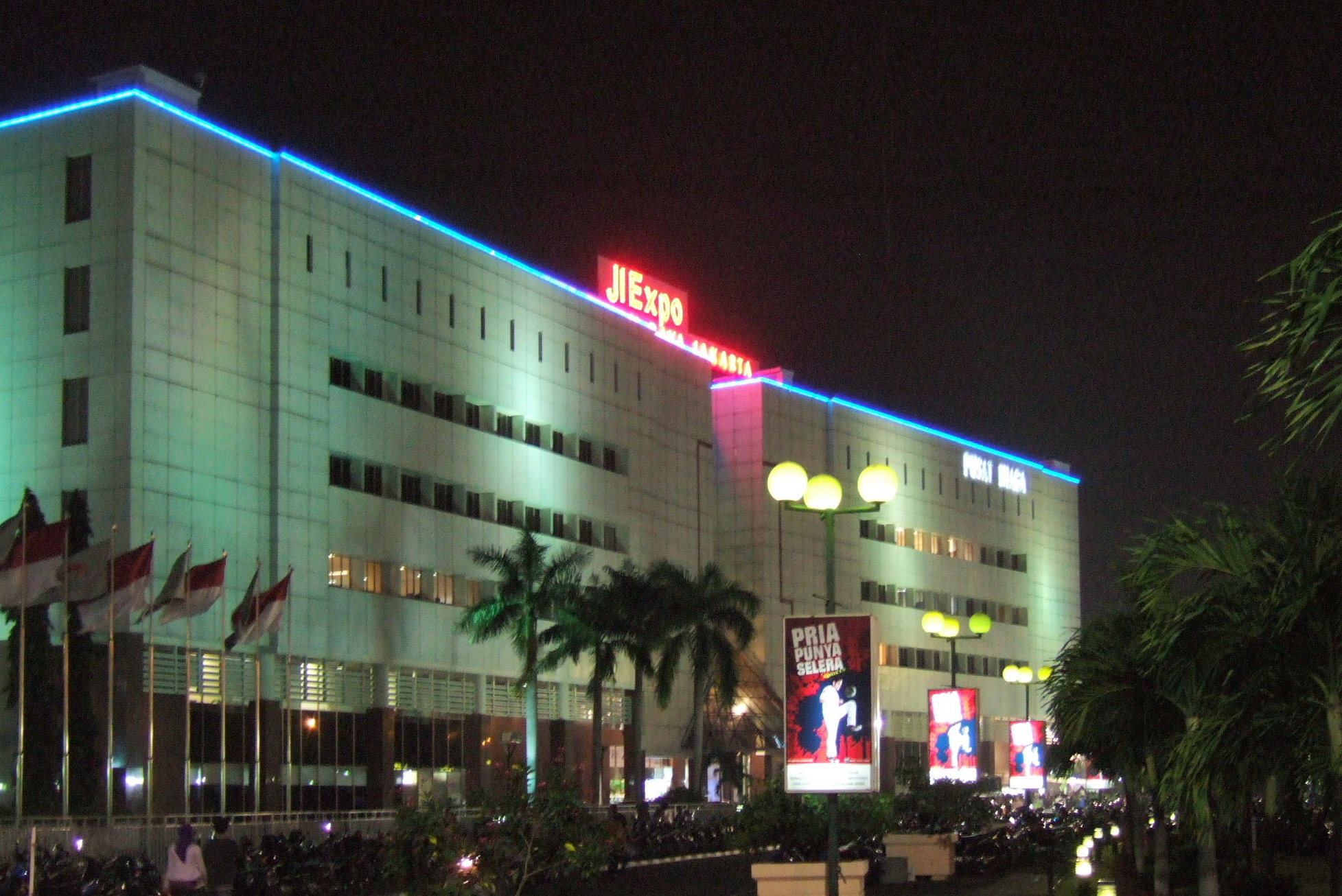
Jakarta International Expo Center was built in 1992 on the site of the former airport tarmac

To avoid a power struggle between agencies over the former airport area, the government issued Government Regulation No. 31 of 1985, in which the state assets that were part of the capital of Angkasa Pura were withdrawn as state assets. After that, the Kemayoran Planning and Development Center (PKK) was formed based on Presidential Decree No. 53 of 1985 in conjunction with Presidential Decree No. 73 of 1999. As an executor, DP3KK was appointed, which carried out construction by utilizing private parties in Indonesia.

The development to turn the former airport area into a city center began in the early 1990s when construction for a housing complex started on the east side of the airport. This was followed by the construction of Jakarta International Expo Center (JIExpo) in 1992 and later on, followed by the construction of skyscrapers at the side of the former airport while the main runway and the second runway were converted into a road. The former main runway that was turned into a road was named in honour of Betawi's legendary Movie Star and Singer, Benyamin Sueb.

The former air traffic control tower and the former main terminal building remain south of the JIExpo site, with a portion of the airport tarmac remaining in front of the terminal, as is the terminal's forecourt. Plans were considered to convert the former main terminal into a government office; this plan was abandoned after 2003, as construction progress has stopped. The current government office stands next to the terminal. The site of the former air traffic control tower was once set for a residential property, with the tower itself torn down, but due to the 1997–98 financial crisis, it has been largely abandoned.

Following the DKI Jakarta Gubernatorial Decree No. 475 of 1993, the former main air traffic control tower was designated as a Cultural Heritage Building that must be preserved. The Decree was signed by then Governor of Jakarta, Soerjadi Soedirdja. Subsequently in 2024, the former Kemayoran terminal building was also designated as a cultural heritage building that must be preserved based on DKI Jakarta Gubernatorial Decree No. 268 of 2024. The decree was signed by the acting Governor of Jakarta Heru Budi Hartono.

== Former airlines and destinations ==
The airport also operates a number of scheduled domestic and international flights to other countries including Australia, Netherlands, Japan, Malaysia, Singapore, Thailand, India, Soviet Union, Italy, France, Germany, Czechoslovakia, Hong Kong, China, United Kingdom, and United States. However, all international routes were ceased and moved to Halim Perdanakusuma International Airport on 10 January 1974.

After the closure of the airport, Soekarno–Hatta International Airport opened for initially domestic flights on 1 May 1985 until it was expanded in February 1991 when some of international flights from Halim Perdanakusuma moved to a new airport located in Tangerang.

== Facilities and operations ==
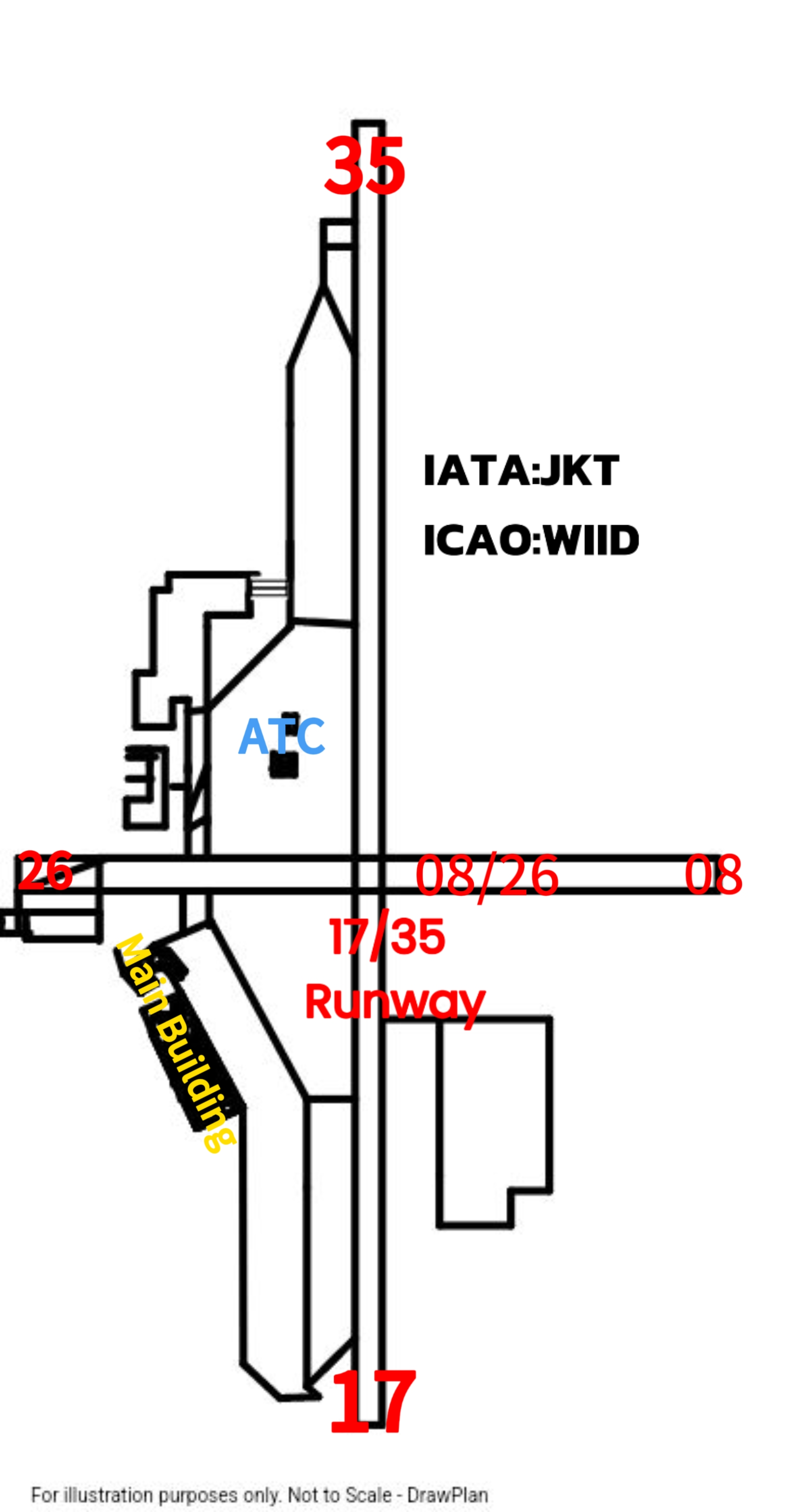
Airport layout

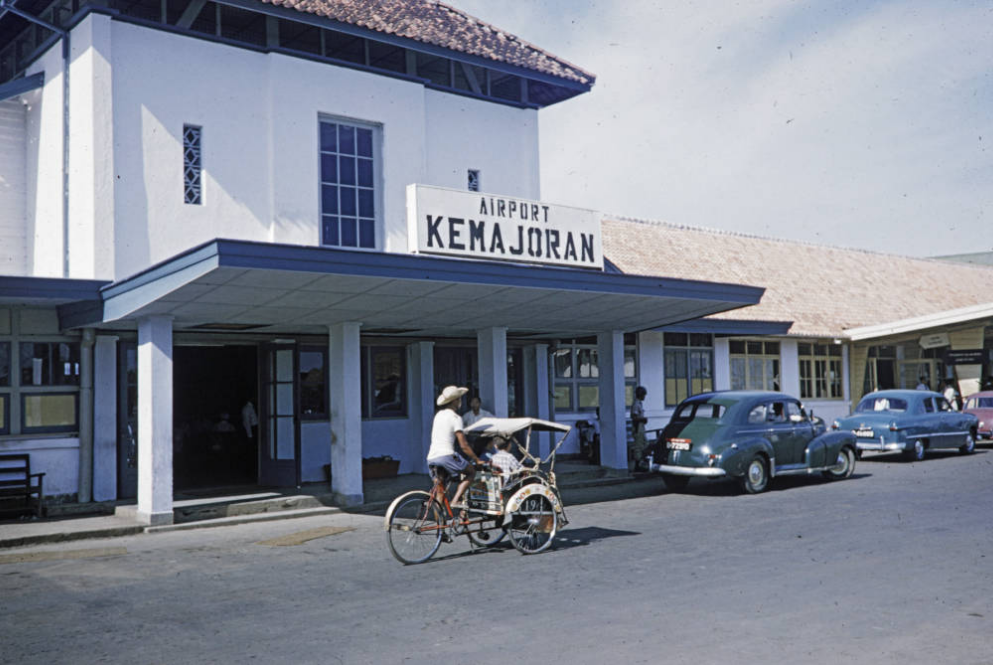
Old terminal building before renovation in 1950s

When it operated in the 1940s, Kemayoran has a circular aerodrome area and had two intersecting (probably grass) runways: runway 17-35, which is the main runway, and runway 08-26, which intersects the main runway by 90° creating a cross and later cruciform shape. Each runway is 800 meters long, oriented north-south and east-west. The airport also included an air traffic control tower, an aviation affairs office, a meteorology office, and a communication center equipped for radio and telegraph communication. A large two-story terminal was designed for passenger comfort that featured cafes, restaurants, telephone booths, a post office, and a loudspeaker system. Not to mention the hangar, which was not only for storing aircraft but also capable of carrying out aircraft and engine maintenance independently.

Around the late 1950s, renovations were carried out on the tower and the terminal building, including the runway and taxiway. The main runway 17-35 was extended to 2,475 meters with a width of 45 meters. while runway 08-26 was extended to 1,850 meters with a width of 30 meters. The runaway was strengthened again in the 1960s to support a maximum take-off weight of 250,000 pounds (around 113 tons). However, after Kemayoran Airport traffic became increasingly dense in 1976, Runway 08-26 had to be closed and used as an aircraft parking area. In early October 1965, the government under President Sukarno began instructing the construction of a new terminal lobby to accommodate foreign tourists and to prepare for the upcoming Conference of the New Emerging Forces. The new terminal lobby and the newly renovated main air traffic control tower were inaugurated in 1966. The terminal building and the air traffic control tower, both with their characteristic 1960s architectural style, can still be seen today.

The main air traffic control tower (approximately five storeys high) has a 360-degree view of the airport grounds. The levels underneath were used as support facilities for air traffic control officers, such as a small pantry, toilets, storerooms, and break rooms. Uniquely, air traffic control officers was not only monitored aircraft traffic, but also human traffic. Around runway 26, there are traffic lights and sirens because the runway is used by local residents as a shortcut. If they want to go to Ancol or Gunung Sahari, the residents of Bendungan Jago prefer to cross runway 26 rather than take a detour. Additionally, close to the main air traffic control tower, stands another tower measuring three storeys tall. The smaller tower served as a supporting office for the main tower. There is also a powerhouse that features a typical 1960s architecture with a few art-deco horizontal ornaments and finishing.

Kemayoran Airport was never equipped with an Instrument landing system (ILS). To assist landings on runways 17-35, there are two navigation locators at the ends of the runway. OB locator is located at the end of runway 35, and its station is located in the Directorate General of Civil Aviation housing complex, not far from Salemba prison. At the end of runway 17, there is a TG locator, whose station is in Ancol on top of a building near the PLN substation owned by Kereta Api Indonesia. The location of Salemba prison and the OB locator is exactly in line with the azimuth of runway 35. Therefore, Salemba prison is also used as a visual checkpoint for the final approach to runway 35.

== In popular culture ==
Kemayoran Airport is the setting for the beginning of The Adventures of Tintin comic, Flight 714 to Sydney, by Hergé. Tintin and his friends, Captain Haddock, Professor Calculus, and Snowy, transit there for refueling stop on the way to Sydney, Australia.

== Accidents and incidents ==
- 13 October 1941: a Royal Netherlands East Indies Army Air Force Lockheed 18-40 aircraft registered LT-910 made an emergency landing 5 minutes after takeoff due to engine failure on its left side. The plane crashed into trees and then into a residential area, catching fire. All 5 passengers and crew members on board, as well as 1 local resident, were killed in the incident.
- On 23 November 1945, a Royal Air Force Douglas DC-3 with registration KG520 crashes at Kemayoran Airport. The Dakota belly landed following an engine failure. The occupants were murdered by Indonesians. Killing 26 people on board.
- On 16 December 1945, a Royal Air Force Douglas Dakota III aircraft registered FL573 crashed into a truck and caught fire after the aircraft experienced instability after takeoff. 1 person was killed when hit by the plane.
- On 6 March 1946, a Royal Air Force Douglas Dakota IV aircraft registered KJ951 made a crosswind landing, causing the aircraft to lose control on the Kemayoran runway. There were no fatalities in the accident.
- On 29 May 1946, a Royal Air Force Douglas Dakota IV aircraft registered KN501 experienced brake failure when landing. There were no fatalities in the accident. However, the aircraft's engines were severely damaged.
- On 27 January 1951, a Grumman G-73 Mallard aircraft registered PK-AKE owned by Bataafsche Petroleum Maatschappij caught fire in the hangar while undergoing routine maintenance.
- On 5 April 1962, a Garuda Indonesia Airways Douglas C-47 Skytrain aircraft registered PK-GDM caught fire in the hangar while undergoing repairs.
- On 1 April 1971, a Merpati Nusantara Airlines NAMC YS-11 aircraft "Nanggala" registered PK-MYN crashed after takeoff. There were no fatalities in the accident.
- On 5 April 1972, a Merpati Nusantara Vickers Viscount, take off from Jakarta, was the subject of an attempted hijacking. The hijacker was killed.
- On 26 September 1972, a Garuda Indonesia Airways Fokker F27 Friendship 600 aircraft registered PK-GFP fell from a height of 30 meters after takeoff. All 3 passengers and crew members on board were killed in the accident.
- On 26 August 1980, a Bouraq Indonesia Airlines Vickers Viscount aircraft registered PK-IVS en route to Kemayoran experienced problems with the right elevator and crashed 26 km northeast of Jakarta. All 37 passengers and crew members were killed. The aircraft was leased from Far Eastern Air Transport.
- On 11 June 1984, a Garuda Indonesia Airways McDonnell Douglas DC-9 aircraft registered PK-GNE experienced 3 bounces when landing. As a result, the rear fuselage almost split. There were no fatalities in the accident.

== Gallery ==
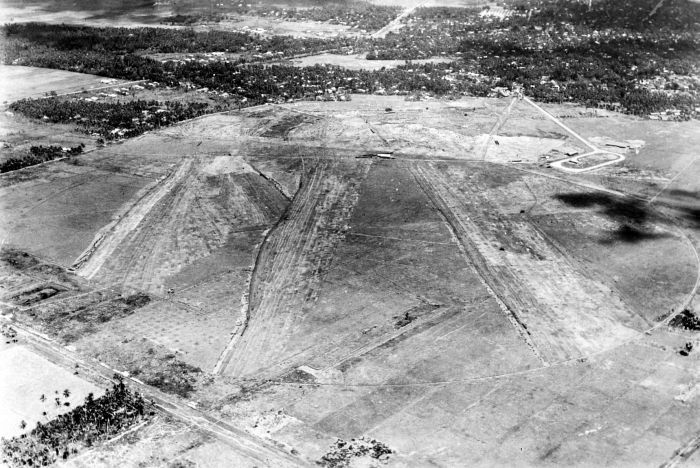
Aerial view of Kemayoran Airport while still under construction.

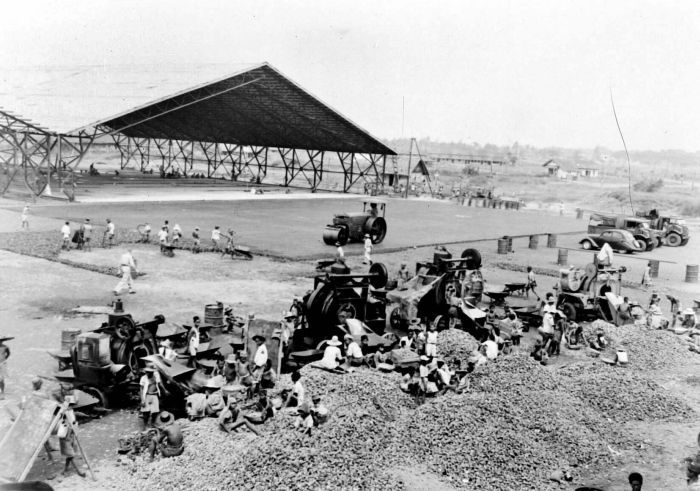
Kemayoran Airport under construction (1948)

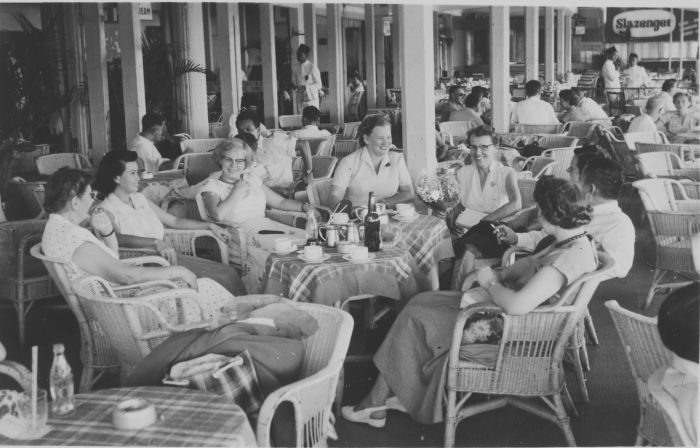
Kemayoran Airport restaurant in the 1950s.

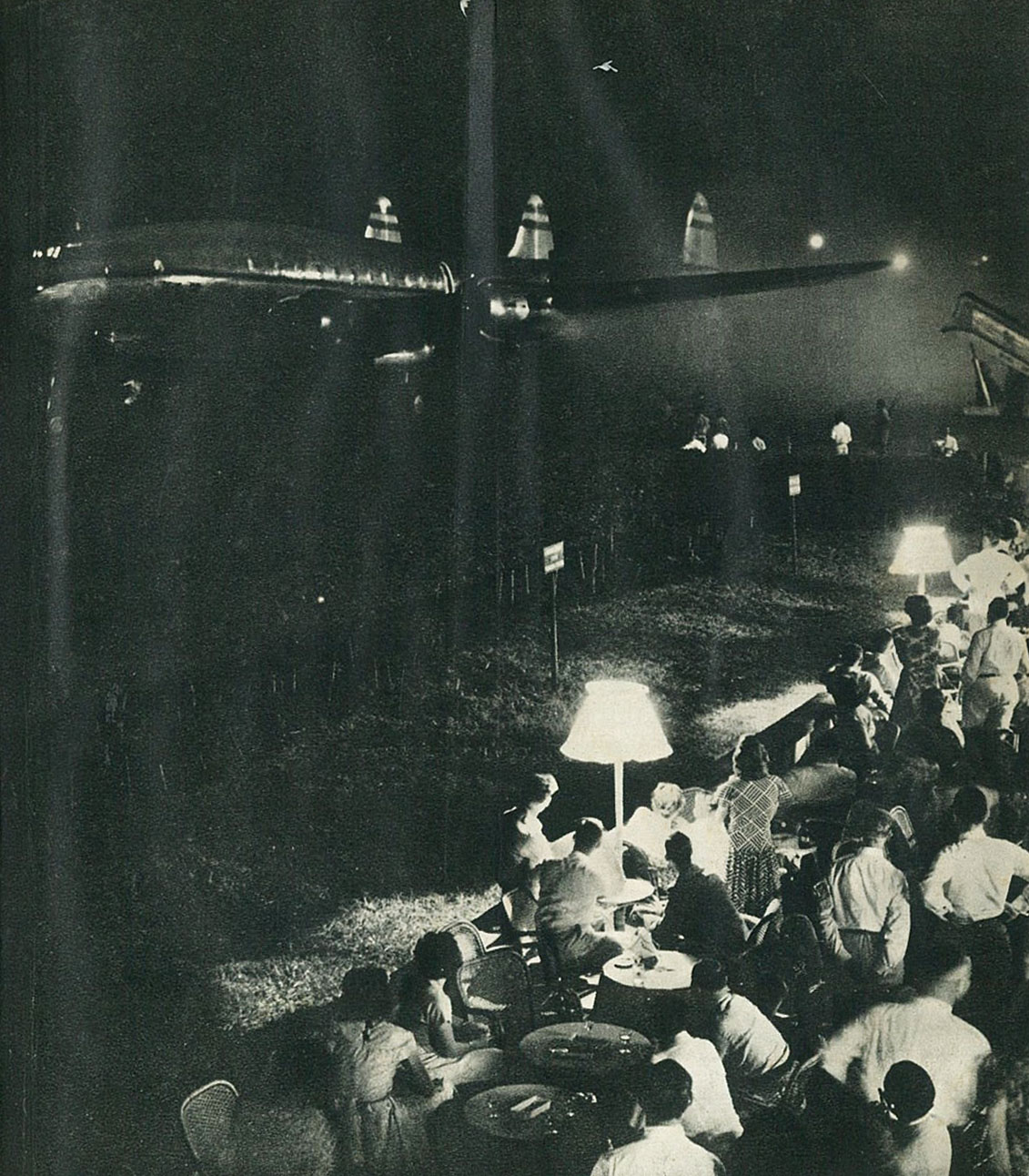
Kemayoran Airport Restaurant at Midnight with KLM Lockheed Constellation visible in the background. (1952)

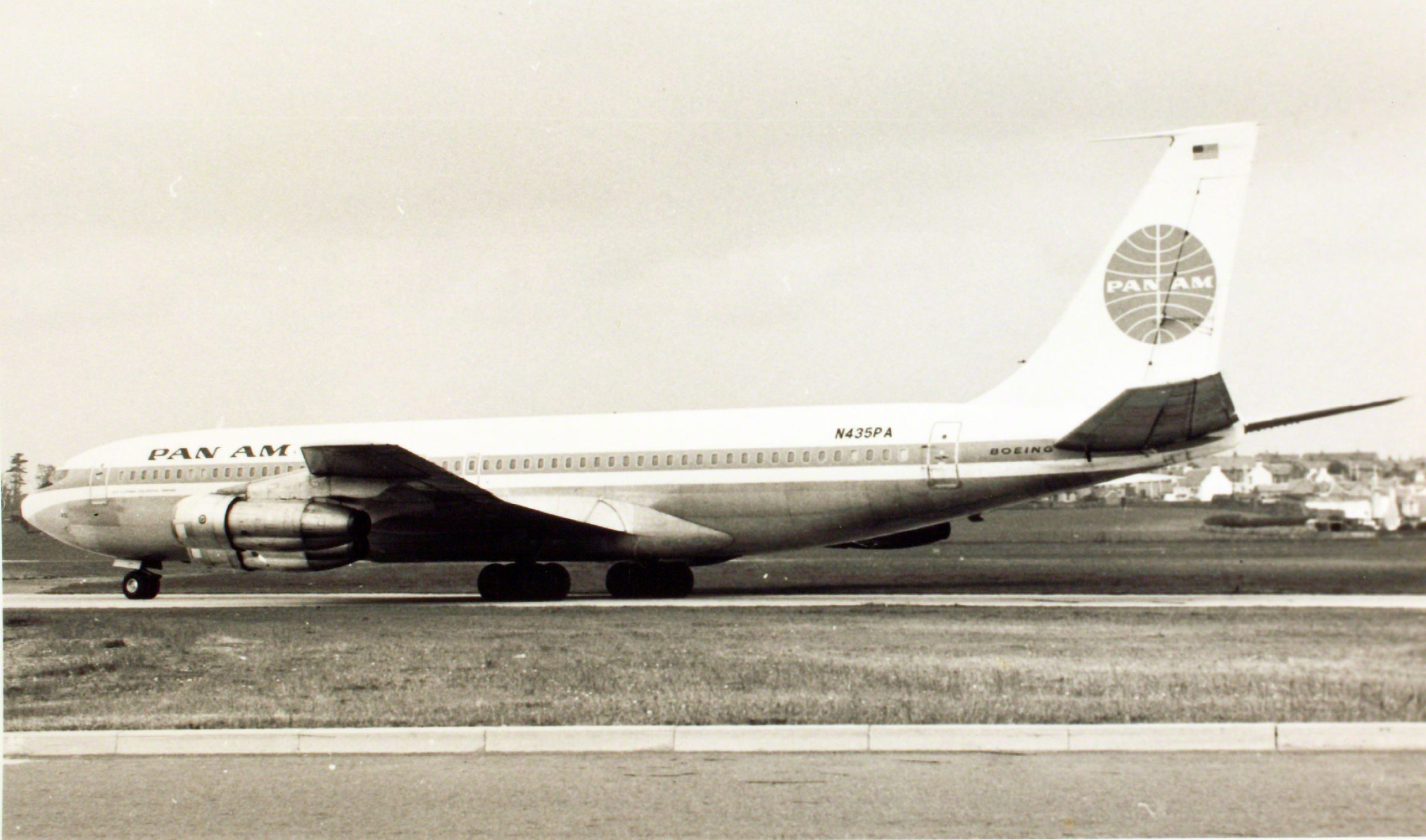
Pan Am Boeing 707 at Kemayoran Airport in 1961.

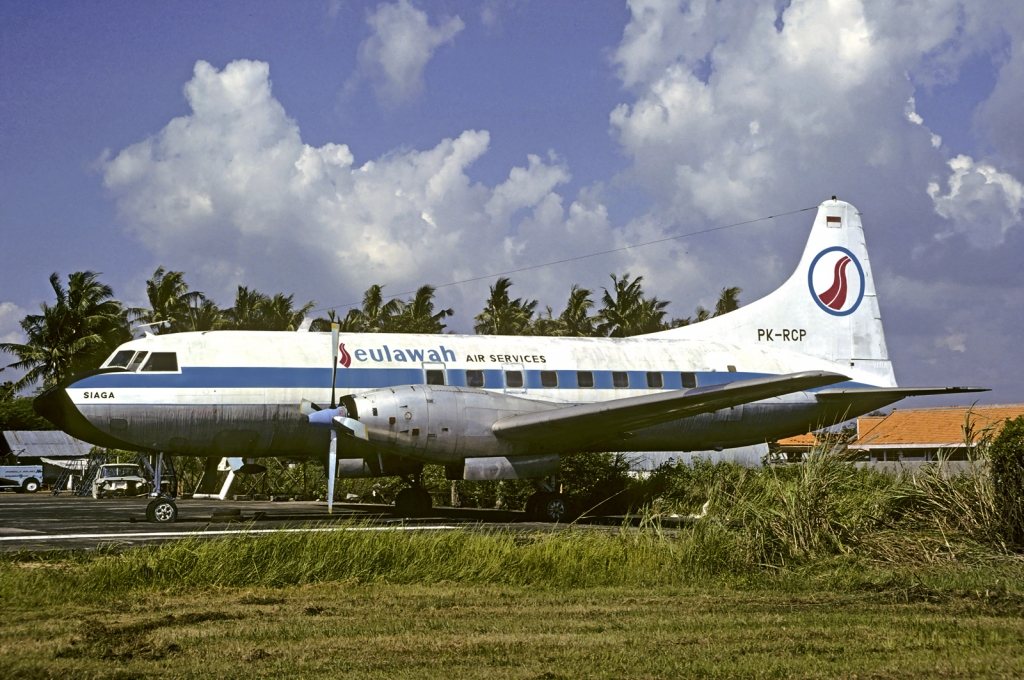
Seulawah Air Services Convair CV-600 at Kemayoran Airport.

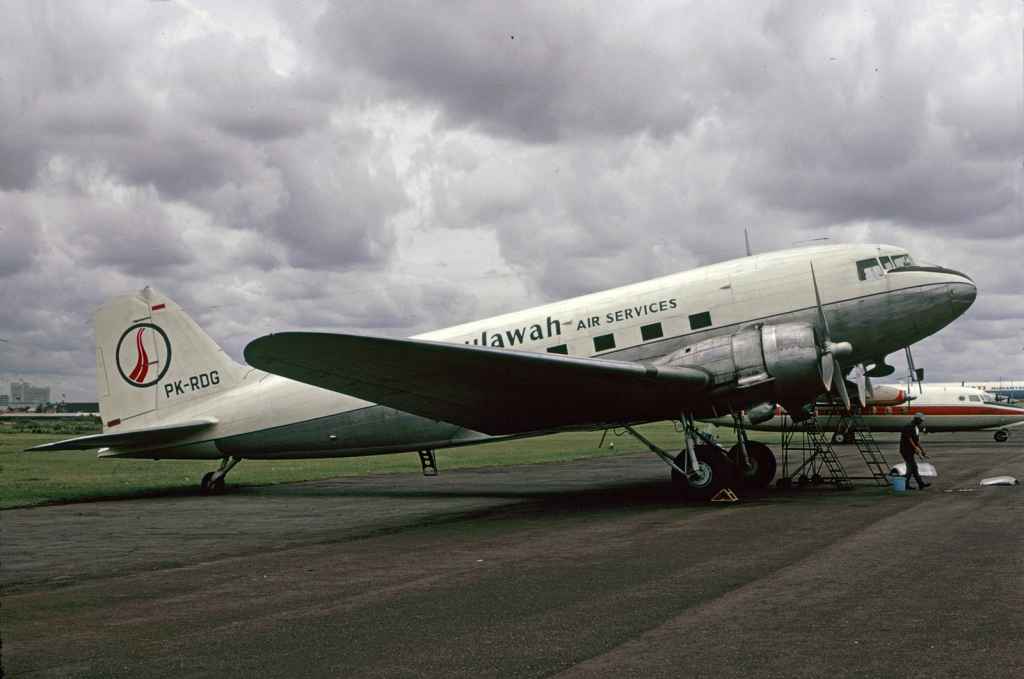
Seulawah Air Services Douglas DC-3 at Kemayoran Airport apron

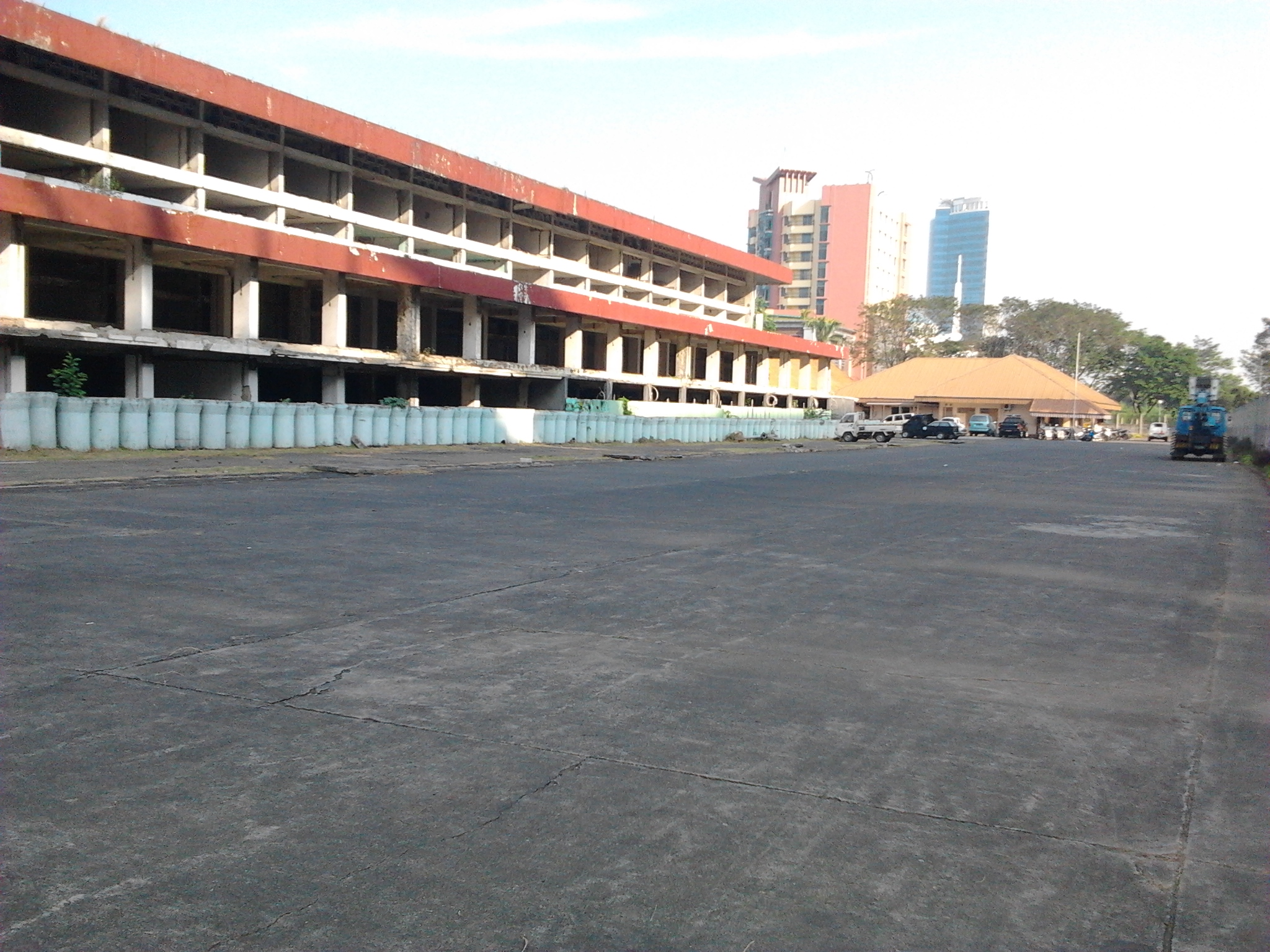
The former main terminal building. Photo taken on 8 July 2012

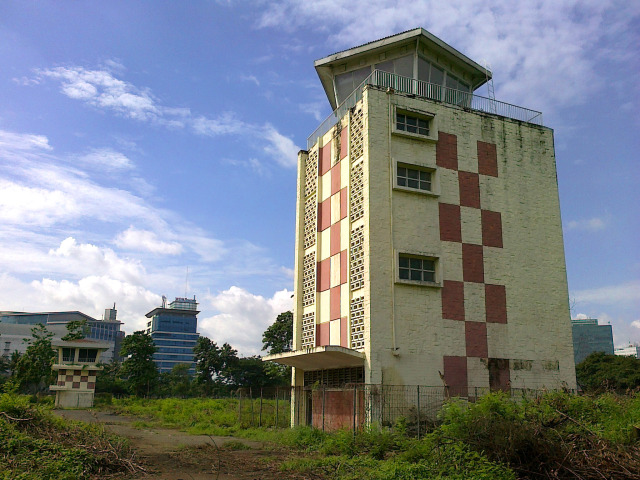
The former main air traffic control tower with a small control tower in the background. Photo taken on 27 January 2013.
