= LIPNUR Sikumbang =

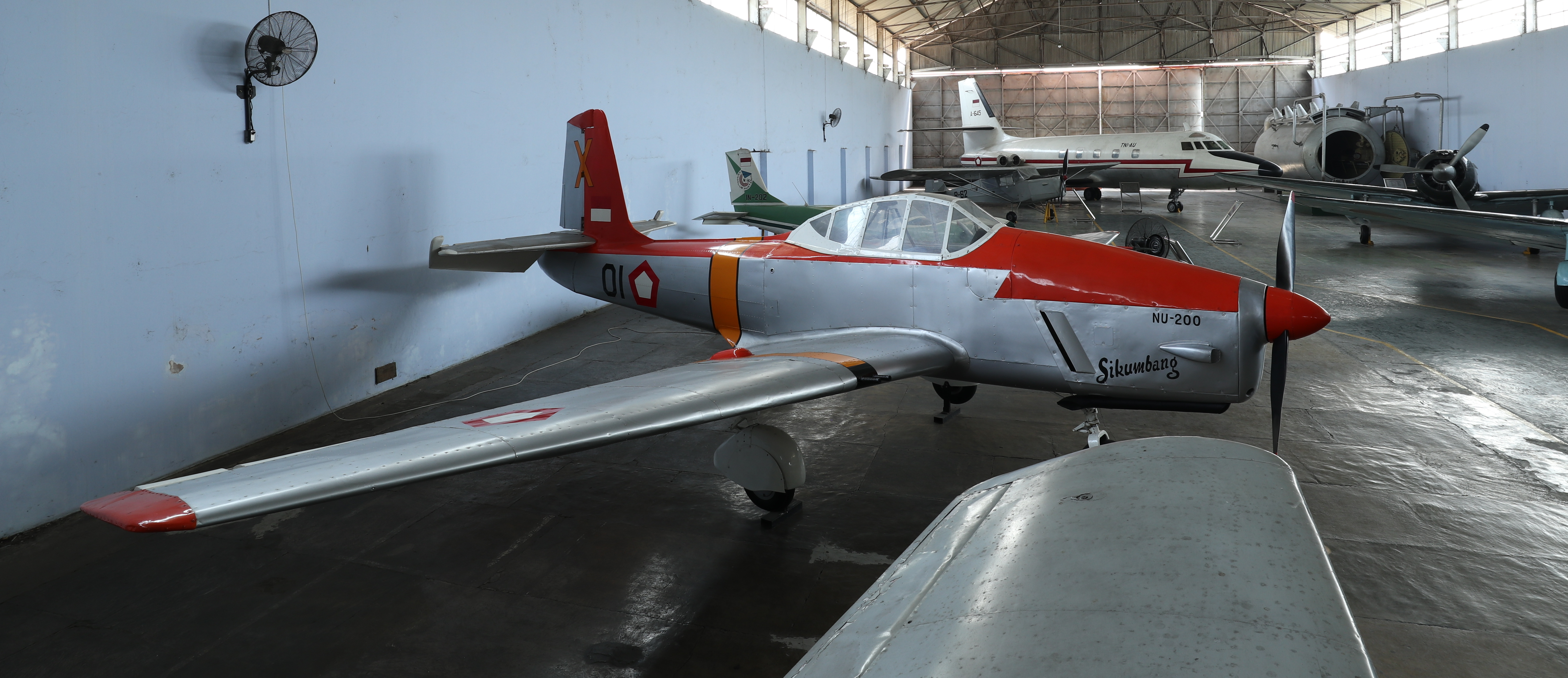
- NU-200 prototype on display at the Dirgantara Mandala Museum in Yogyakarta

General information
- Type: Counter-insurgency aircraft
- Manufacturer: Angkatan Udara Republik Indonesia, Depot Penjelidikan, Pertjobaan dan Pembuatan/LIPNUR
- Designer: Nurtanio Pringgoadisuryo (id)
- Primary user: Indonesian Air Force
- Number built: 2

History
- First flight: 1 August 1954
- Retired: 1967

The LIPNUR Sikumbang (Indonesian: Beetle) was a low-wing monoplane of mixed construction built in Indonesia in 1954 as a COIN and anti-guerrilla-warfare aircraft. Of conventional configuration, it had fixed tricycle undercarriage and seated the pilot under a bubble canopy. A single example was built under the designation NU-200 in 1954, and another as the NU-225 in 1957. The latter machine was grounded in 1967.

== Design and development ==
=== NU-200 ===
Due to various internal rebellions that happened across Indonesia in the early 1950s, Major Nurtanio Pringgoadisuryo, head of Indonesian Air Force’s Research, Development, and Production Depot, was inspired to design and build a light counter-insurgency aircraft to meet the demands of the Air Force. Nurtanio, together with two technicians, Second Lieutenant Achmad and Second Lieutenant Tosin, built the aircraft in their spare time with limited funds from the Air Force and tooling, spare parts and materials available at the depot's facility in Andir airfield, Bandung.

The aircraft was powered by a single 200 hp de Havilland Gipsy Six air-cooled inverted inline piston engine with two-bladed fixed-pitch propeller. The fuselage was made from welded 4130 steel (chromoly) with metal skins, while the wings and tail surfaces were all-wood material. It has cantilevered low wing with NACA 23012 airfoil, with the wing consisted of one-piece two-spar wooden construction with plywood covering, fitted with electric split-type flaps and statically balanced ailerons. The tail surfaces were made of wood with plywood skins, with trim-tab fitted to the port elevator and rudder. The aircraft has a fixed tricycle landing gear with cantilever oleo shock struts and non-steerable nose wheel.

The first prototype was dubbed NU-200 Sikumbang. The "NU" stands for Nurtanio, while "200" refers to the power of its Gipsy Six engine. The NU-200 first flew on 1 August 1954 piloted by Captain Powers, an American flight instructor and test pilot hired by the Indonesian Air Force. Originally, Nurtanio was supposed to flew the first flight, however Marshal Soerjadi Soerjadarma, the Air Force chief of staff, ordered him not to do so. The NU-200 flew for 15 minutes. Captain Powers praised the aircraft's flight control, although there's an issue with the engine cooling system, which forced him to reduce the power.

The NU-200 was flown to Kemayoran Airport in February 1955 for an exhibition. Nurtanio also planned to flew the aircraft over the 2,900 m (9,500 ft) summit of Mount Merapi in central Java. Marshal Soerjadarma, on recommendation from Nurtanio's friend Jacob Salatun, again disapproved the idea and ordered him to cancel the flight. Instead, Nurtanio flew the aircraft over Bandung and as he landed it, the engine was having a trouble and "spluttering to a halt".

== Variants ==
- NU-200: First prototype, powered by a 200 hp de Havilland Gipsy Six engine with two-bladed fixed-pitch wooden propeller and fixed tricycle landing gear.
- NU-225: Improved pre-production variant, powered by a 225 hp Continental O-470-A engine with Hartzell metal propeller and retractable tricycle landing gear.
- NU-260 Kumbang: Four-seat liaison aircraft variant of the NU-225, also planned for the civilian market. A single prototype was under construction before the project was cancelled.

== Specifications (NU-200) ==
Data from Jane's All The World's Aircraft 1955–56

General characteristics

- Crew: 1
- Length: 8.16 m (26 ft 9 in)
- Wingspan: 10.61 m (34 ft 10 in)
- Height: 3.35 m (11 ft 0 in)
- Wing area: 16.9 m^{2} (182 sq ft)
- Aspect ratio: 6.6:1
- Airfoil: NACA 23015 at root, NACA 23009 at tip
- Empty weight: 795 kg (1,753 lb)
- Gross weight: 1,090 kg (2,403 lb)
- Fuel capacity: 205 L (54 US gal; 45 imp gal)
- Powerplant: 1 × de Havilland Gipsy Six air-cooled inverted six-cylinder inline engine, 150 kW (200 hp)
- Propellers: 2-bladed fixed pitch

Performance

- Maximum speed: 256 km/h (159 mph, 138 kn)
- Cruise speed: 224 km/h (139 mph, 121 kn)
- Range: 960 km (600 mi, 520 nmi)
- Service ceiling: 5,030 m (16,500 ft)
- Rate of climb: 5.1 m/s (1,000 ft/min)

== See also ==
- LIPNUR Belalang
- LIPNUR Kunang
- LIPNUR Super Kunang

Aircraft of comparable role, configuration, and era

- Fletcher FD-25
- American Electric Piranha
- SIAI Marchetti SF.260
- Soko J-20 Kraguj
