= IPTN N2130 =

Proposed regional airliner

N2130
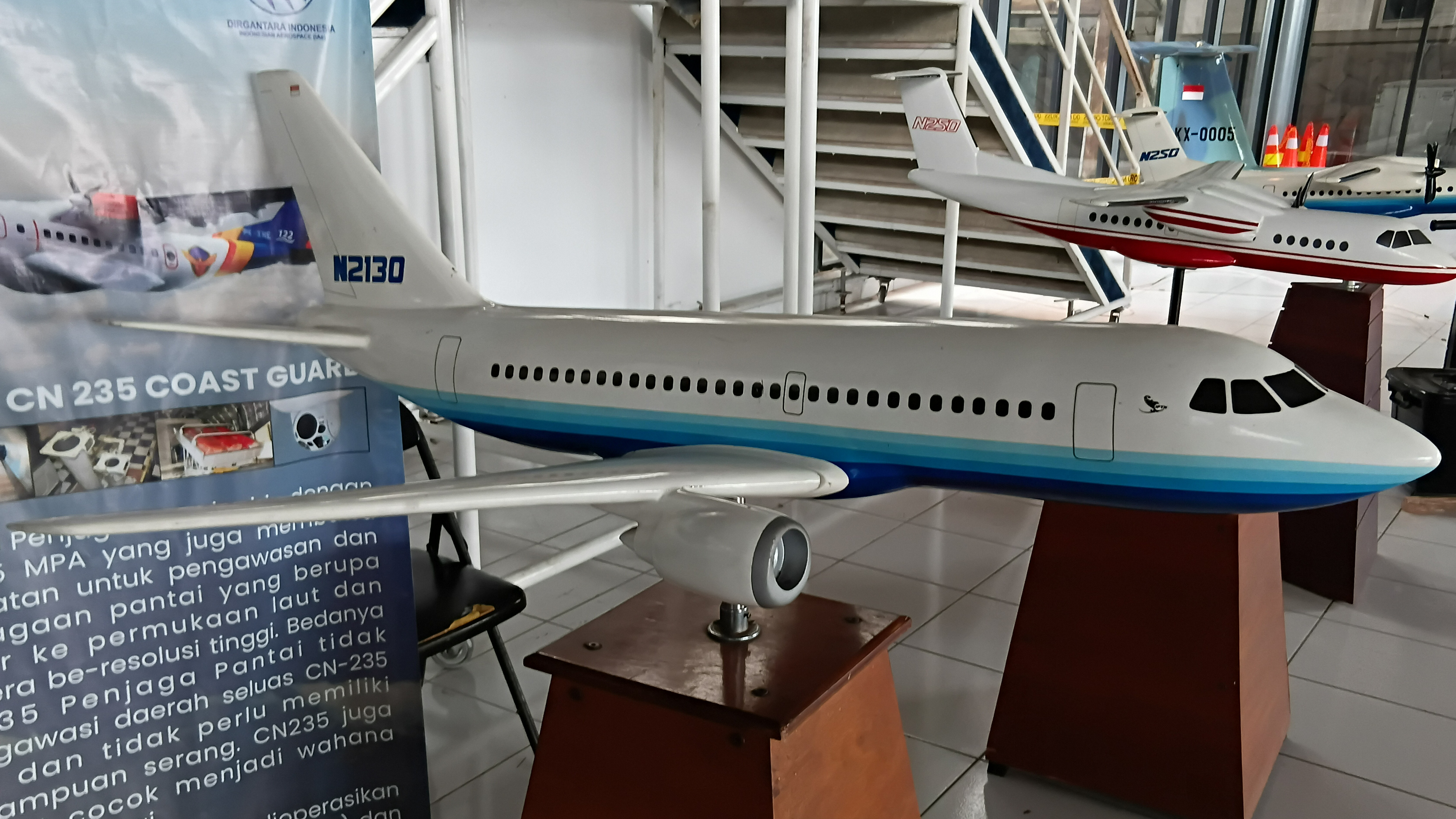
- A scale model of IPTN N2130

General information
- Type: Regional jet
- National origin: Indonesia
- Manufacturer: IPTN
- Status: Cancelled 1998
- Number built: 0

History
- First flight: never built

The IPTN N2130 was a proposed 80-130 passenger commuter airliner of original design by IPTN (now Indonesian Aerospace). The N2130 was estimated to cost two billion US dollars. The project was cancelled in 1998 due to the Asian financial crisis.

The aircraft has similarities with the Boeing 737 and Airbus A318.

== Variants ==
- N2130-80 - 80 seater Regional Jet
- N2130-100 - 104 seat Regional Jet
- N2130-130 - 132 seat Regional Jet

== Specifications ==
	2130-S	2130-M	2130-L
Cockpit crew	2	2	2
Seating capacity	80	104	132
Length	27.23 metres (89.3 ft)	29.65 metres (97.3 ft)	33.37 metres (109.5 ft)
Wingspan	28.95 metres (95.0 ft)		
Wing area			
Wing sweepback			
Overall height			
Maximum cabin width			
Fuselage width	3,91 m	3,91 m	3,91 m
Cargo capacity			
Operating empty weight, typical			
Maximum take-off weight (MTOW)	40,000 kilograms (88,000 lb)	45,000 kilograms (99,000 lb)	51,000 kilograms (112,000 lb)
Cruising speed (mach)	0.8	0.8	0.8
Maximum speed			
Takeoff field length (MTOW, SL, ISA)	1750	1750	1750
Maximum range, fully loaded	2,220 kilometres (1,200 nmi)	2,970 kilometres (1,600 nmi)	
Maximum fuel capacity			
Service ceiling			
Engines (×2)			
Thrust (×2)			
