= Indonesian Aerospace Elang Hitam =

Indonesian unmanned aerial vehicle

Elang Hitam
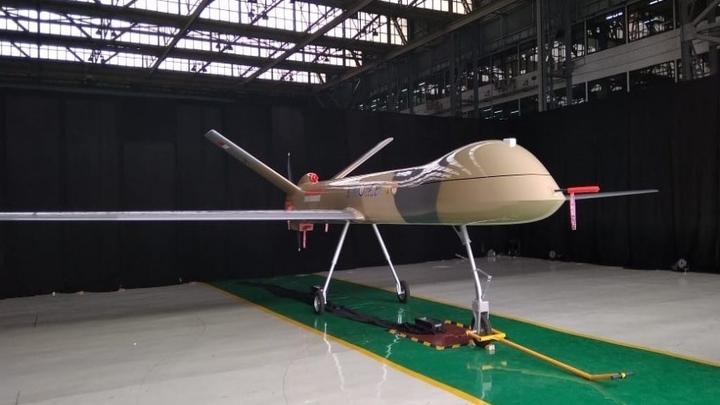
- Elang Hitam rolled out in IAe hangar, December 2019

General information
- Type: Unmanned combat aerial vehicle
- National origin: Indonesia
- Manufacturer: Indonesian Aerospace
- Designer: Indonesian Aerospace, BRIN (Note: previously BPPT and LAPAN)
- Status: Under development
- Primary user: Indonesian National Armed Forces
- Number built: 1 prototype

History
- First flight: 28 July 2025; 10 months ago

The Elang Hitam (English: Black Eagle) is an unmanned aerial vehicle (UAV) and Medium-altitude long-endurance UAV (MALE) being developed by Indonesian Aerospace (IAe / PT DI) in cooperation with a consortium of six other institutions—Agency for Assessment and Application of Technology (BPPT), National Institute of Aeronautics and Space (LAPAN), Indonesian Ministry of Defense, Indonesian Air Force, Bandung Institute of Technology (ITB), and PT LEN Industri.

This drone was first shown on 30 December 2019 at the IAe hangar in Bandung, West Java.

== Development history ==
The development of a MALE UCAV was initiated by the Ministry of Defense's Research and Development department in 2015. The UAV was designed for the needs of the Indonesian Air Force. The development started with preliminary design and basic design, which was marked with the construction of a wind tunnel model and its test in 2016. Another wind tunnel model was constructed and tested in 2018.

A consortium consisted of Agency for Assessment and Application of Technology (BPPT), Directorate General of Defense Potential of Ministry of Defense, Indonesian Air Force, Bandung Institute of Technology (ITB), Indonesian Aerospace, and PT LEN Industri was formed in 2017. In 2019, LAPAN entered as a member of the consortium, and took part in the development of the MALE UCAV. During development, the UAV was formerly known as PUNA MALE (Indonesian: Pesawat Udara Nirawak jenis Medium Altitude Long Endurance, lit. 'Unmanned MALE aircraft').

The first prototype was rolled out on 30 December 2019 at the Indonesian Aerospace hangar. Indonesian Aerospace planned to build two more prototypes in 2020. The first prototype would be used for pre-certification developmental testing, with the other two to be used for test flights and structural tests, respectively. Two additional prototypes were planned; in total five prototypes would be built.

First flight is expected to take place at the end of 2020. The Elang Hitam, according to its development plan, will be armed with missiles and capable of flying up to 30 hours non-stop with a cruising altitude of up to 23,000 ft. The specification is said to match the Chinese-made CH-4 Rainbow drone.

Due to the Covid-19 pandemic, the first flight which was originally scheduled to fly for the first time in 2020 has been postponed to August 2021. The first flight was attempted in December 2021, but it failed.

Two members of the Elang Hitam consortium, BPPT and LAPAN, was dissolved in September 2021 and merged into National Research and Innovation Agency (BRIN).

On 1 June 2022, PT LEN Industri's contract to develop Elang Hitam mission system is renewed by Indonesian Defense Ministry.

On 17 July 2022, Indonesia announced a collaboration with Turkey to manufacture air-to-surface missiles that can be easily mounted on UAVs.

Chairman of BRIN Laksana Tri Handoko stated that development of the Elang Hitam as a military platform was discontinued as of 15 September 2022. The cancellation were due to its failed test flight attempt in December 2021 and difficulties on acquiring key technologies from foreign partners. Instead, the Elang Hitam would be repurposed for civilian use.

In October 2024, the Defense Industrial Policy Committee (KKIP) decided that the development of Elang Hitam was returned as a UCAV for military purposes.

Elang Hitam successfully carried out its maiden flight at Kertajati Airport, West Java on 28 July 2025.

== Specifications ==
Data from LAPAN, BRIN, IAe SINDOgrafis

General characteristics

- Capacity: 300 kg (661 lb)
- Length: 8.65 m (28 ft 5 in)
- Wingspan: 16 m (52 ft 6 in)
- Height: 2.6 m (8 ft 6 in)
- Empty weight: 575 kg (1,268 lb)
- Max takeoff weight: 1,300 kg (2,866 lb)
- Powerplant: 1 × Rotax 915 iS turbocharged engine , 104 kW (139 hp)
- Propellers: 2-bladed

Performance

- Maximum speed: 235 km/h (146 mph, 127 kn)
- Range: 250 km (160 mi, 130 nmi) LOS
- Endurance: 30 hours
- Service ceiling: 9.144 m (30.000 ft)

Avionics

=== Armaments ===
- IAe 70 mm Folding-Fin Aerial Rocket
- Roketsan MAM-L guided bomb
- Roketsan MAM-C guided bomb
