= LIPNUR Kindjeng =

B-8m Kindjeng

General information
- Type: Sports aircraft
- Manufacturer: Angkatan Udara Republik Indonesia, Depot Penjelidikan, Pertjobaan dan Pembuatan/LIPNUR

The LIPNUR B-8m Kindjeng was a prototype sports biplane built in Indonesia. it was powered by a Lycoming O-320 engine.
