= LIPNUR Kolentang =

Kolentang

General information
- Type: Gyrocopter
- Manufacturer: Angkatan Udara Republik Indonesia, Depot Penjelidikan, Pertjobaan dan Pembuatan/LIPNUR

The LIPNUR Kolentang was an Indonesian autogyro based on a Bensen design.
