= LeVier Cosmic Wind =

Cosmic Wind
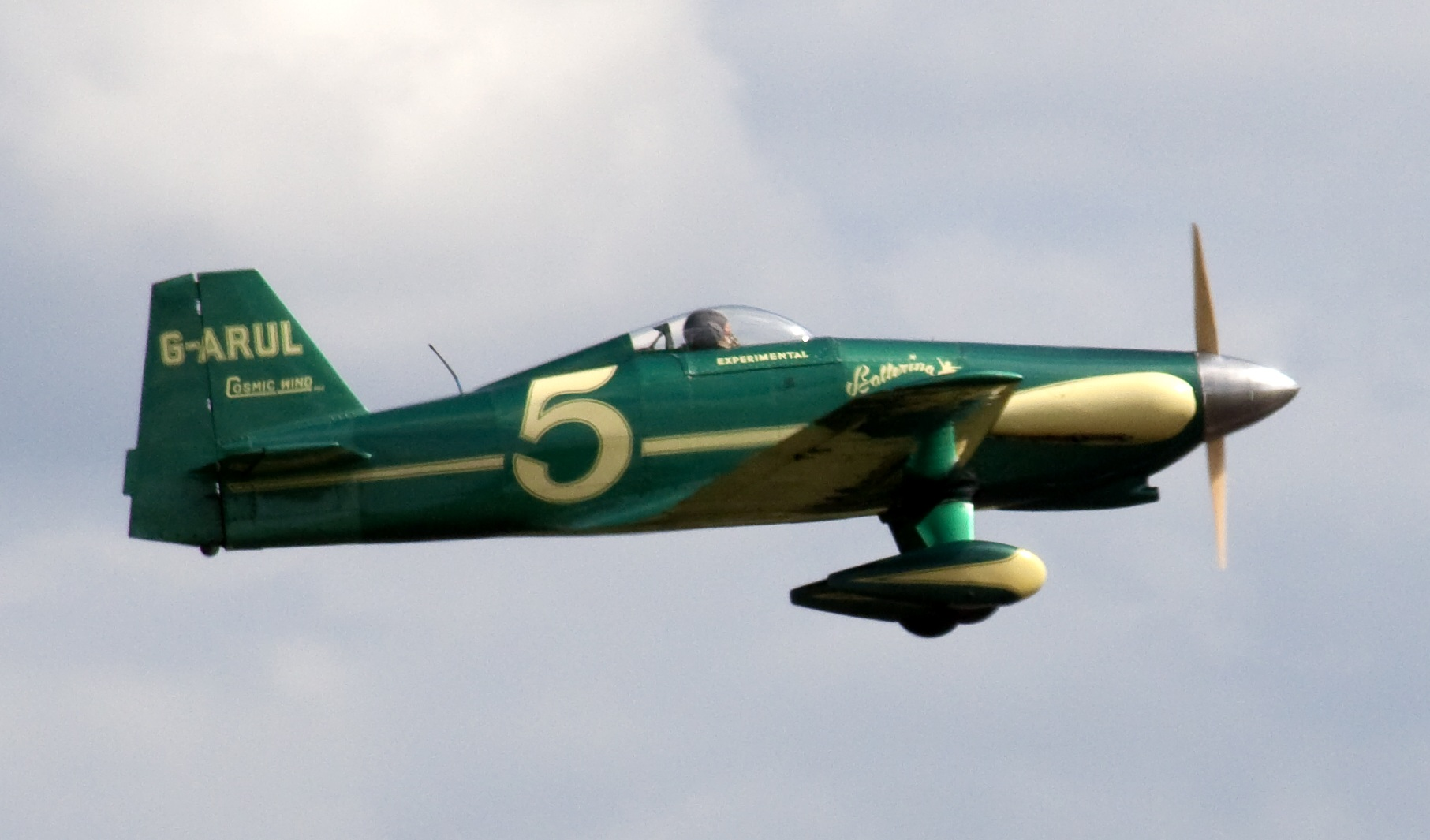
- Cosmic Wind G-ARUL at the 2009 Cosford Air Show

General information
- Type: Racing aircraft
- National origin: United States
- Designer: Tony LeVier
- Number built: 6

History
- First flight: July 3, 1947
- Variant: American Electric Piranha

The LeVier Cosmic Wind is a small single engine, single seat racing monoplane designed and built by staff of the Lockheed Corporation in 1947. It did not race successfully in the US but one won the premier cross-country competition in the UK in 1964. It still flies today.

== Design and development ==
The Cosmic Wind was designed and built by Lockheed's chief test pilot, Tony LeVier, and a group of Lockheed engineers. A very small single-seat racer, it was aimed at the Goodyear Trophy for Formula 1 class racers initiated in the US soon after World War II.

It is an all-metal low-wing cantilever monoplane. Wings and tail surfaces are all straight-edged and tapered. The ailerons are full span and carry trim tabs, as does the full-fin-depth rudder. The undercarriage is fixed, with streamlined main legs and wheels in long fairings. The roller tailwheel is tucked into the rear corner of the fuselage forward of the rudder. The cockpit is enclosed with a small, single-piece, perspex canopy. The first aircraft were powered by 85 hp (63 kW) Continental C-85 horizontally opposed engines but more recently at least four have used the 100 hp (75 kW) Continental O-200-A. The engine installation includes a large pointed spinner and long, bulbous cylinder head/exhaust fairings.

== Operational history ==
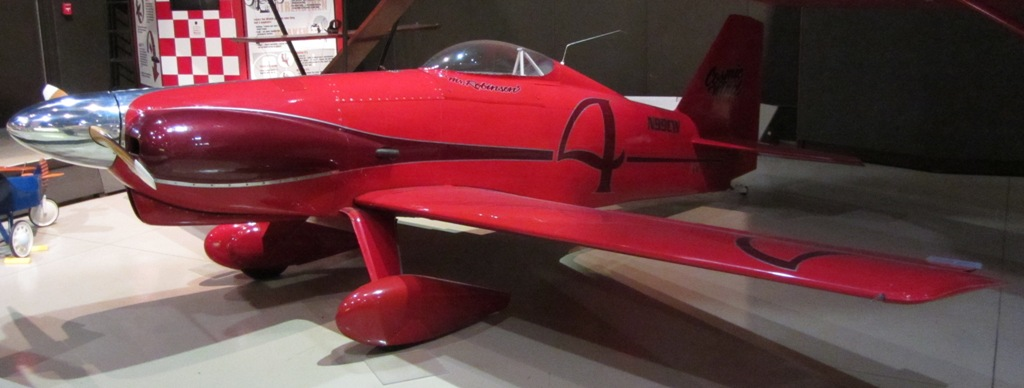
Cosmic Wind on display

Three Cosmic Winds were built at Lockheed's between 1947 and 1948 and a fourth rather later. A fifth was also built in the US by amateur constructors. The last example was built in the UK as late as 1972. The type was not particularly successful in competitions in the 1940s, coming only 3rd and 4th in the 1947 Goodyear Trophy races. One example of the first three, named Ballerina and exported to the UK as G-ARUL, won the King's Cup Race of 1964; it remains active in the UK, and is a regular participant in air displays. G-ARUL was rebuilt follolwing a 1966 crash. The UK-built Cosmic Wind remains on the civil aircraft register as G-BAER, but currently (2010-10) lacks a Permit to Fly.

In the US, the amateur-built example is now in the EAA AirVenture Museum, Oshkosh, Wisconsin. Another Cosmic Wind, built or modified with a shoulder rather than low wing, is in the Planes of Fame Air Museum, Chino, California.

== Specifications (85 hp engine) ==
Data from Airlife's World Aircraft

General characteristics

- Crew: 1
- Length: 16 ft 8 in (5.08 m)
- Wingspan: 18 ft 11 in (5.77 m)
- Height: 4 ft 3 in (1.3 m)
- Max takeoff weight: 849 lb (385 kg)
- Powerplant: 1 × Continental C85 air cooled horizontally opposed piston, 85 hp (63 kW)

Performance

- Maximum speed: 185 mph (298 km/h, 161 kn)
- Cruise speed: 160 mph (257 km/h, 139 kn)
- Range: 318 mi (512 km, 276 nmi)
- Rate of climb: 2,500 ft/min (12.7 m/s) initial
