= LIPNUR Belalang =

Belalang
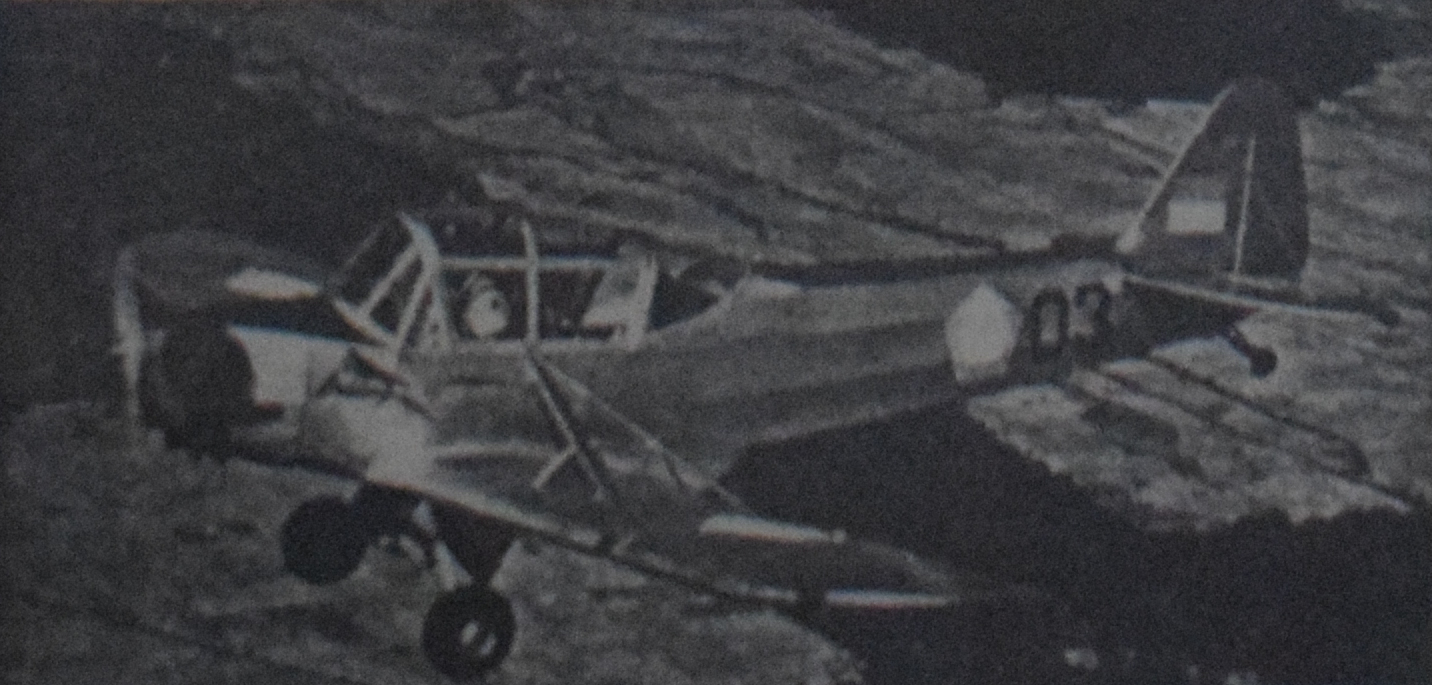
- NU-85 Belalang prototype in-flight

General information
- Type: Military trainer
- National origin: Indonesia
- Manufacturer: Angkatan Udara Republik Indonesia, Depot Penjelidikan, Pertjobaan dan Pembuatan/LIPNUR
- Designer: Nurtanio Pringgoadisuryo (id)
- Status: Retired
- Primary users: Indonesian Air Force Indonesian Army; Indonesian Civil Aviation Institute
- Number built: 9 (estimated)

History
- Introduction date: 1959
- First flight: 17 April 1958
- Developed from: Piper J-3 Cub

The LIPNUR Belalang (Indonesian: Grasshopper) was a military trainer aircraft built in small numbers in Indonesia by LIPNUR in the late 1950s. It was essentially a Piper L-4J Grasshopper converted to give it a low wing. The NU-85 prototype flew for the first time on 17 April 1958 and the first production of NU-90 took place in 1959. The aircraft was operated by Indonesian Air Force. Indonesian Army and Indonesian Civil Aviation Institute at Curug, Tangerang also used this aircraft.

== Design and development ==
In 1949-1950 period, the Indonesian Air Force (then called AURI) received around 60 Piper L-4J Grasshoppers from Royal Netherlands East Indies Air Force as part of the transfer of sovereignty. AURI used them as liaison and primary trainer aircraft. In 1957, AURI decided that their ex-Dutch L-4Js, which were powered by 65 hp Continental O-170, were already ageing and needed to be replaced. The L-4Js also has high wing configuration so its aerobatic performance is very limited.

Nurtanio Pringgoadisuryo, head of AURI’s Research, Development, and Production Depot at Andir airfield in Bandung, decided to modified the ageing L-4Js as it can be developed rapidly and with low technology and thus has a low production cost. An L-4J was then modified by converting it into a low wing design with "V" lift struts and it was powered with an 85 hp Continental C-85 four-cylinder horizontally opposed piston engine with Sensenich two-bladed fixed-pitch propeller. The aircraft maintained its old canopy but due to the new wing structure the canopy was hinged open to the right. The prototype was then designated as NU-85 Belalang. The 85 was derived from the 85 hp engine, while the name Belalang (grasshopper) was used as his single-engine designs were named after insects.

The NU-85 prototype first flew on 17 April 1958. Another source stated that it was first flown on 26 April 1958, piloted by Nurtanio himself. After testing, it was determined that the NU-85 performed better than the L-4Js in their role as primary trainer. Despite the performance observed, Nurtanio determined it still needed further refinement.

Then in 1959, Nurtanio designed the NU-90. The differences from its predecessor are it was powered by more powerful 90 hp Continental C-90-12F flat-four direct-drive engine. It also has bubble canopy that were split into two sections, the forward section hinged to the right and the rear section slides to the aft. The improved NU-90A variant was powered with 100 hp Continental O-200 engine with 6 ft (1.8 m)-diameter McCauley metal fixed-pitch propeller. The NU-90A also has sliding canopy. It retains many of the L-4J's features, although modified, such as its USA-35B airfoil but with the flaps removed, extended length of the ailerons, the split-axle mainwheels which was moved 10 cm forward, and also L-4Js original wing structures. The wings itself was braced with V-struts from the top section of the fuselage longerons and was set 1° 37’ incidence at the root and 5° dihedral. The control surfaces were consisted of aluminum-alloy-frame covered with fiberglass. The fuselage was of welded steel construction covered with fiberglass, while the vertical stabilizer was fabric-covered welded steel.

== Operational history ==
Three pre-production NU-90 were sent to the Indonesian Air Force Academy in Yogyakarta for evaluation. Although the aircraft were still in the evaluation stage, eight cadets managed to solo fly after being trained with the three Belalangs. The three aircraft were then sent back to the LIPNUR facility at Bandung to be reconditioned and overhauled. Those aircraft then were transferred to the Indonesian Aviation Civil Institute in Curug, Tangerang. Satisfied with the aircraft's performance, Indonesian Air Force ordered 50 units of Belalang to replace the L-4J Grasshoppers, but the orders could not be fulfilled as the LIPNUR facility at that time lacked tools to mass-produced them. The Indonesian Army Aviation Command also expressed interest with Belalang. The Indonesian Army Aviation School at Kalibanteng airfield in Semarang received 5 Belalangs to be used as primary trainers. As of 2017, a single incomplete Belalang still exist and used as a teaching tool at a vocational high school in Semarang.

== Variants ==
- Belalang NU-85 - 85 hp Continental C-85 engine and hinged canopy, single prototype.
- Belalang NU-90 - 90 hp Continental C-90-12F engine, three pre-production aircraft.
- Belalang NU-90A - 75 kW (100 hp) Continental O-200 engine replacing 67 kW (90 hp) Continental C-90-12F of earlier versions, sliding canopy, revised undercarriage, five production aircraft.

== Operators ==
Indonesia

- Indonesian Air Force
- Indonesian Army
  - Indonesian Army Aviation Command
- Politeknik Penerbangan Indonesia Curug

== Specifications (90A) ==
Data from Jane's All The World's Aircraft 1965-66

General characteristics

- Crew: 2
- Length: 7.70 m (25 ft 3 in)
- Wingspan: 9.50 m (31 ft 2 in)
- Height: 2.03 m (6 ft 8 in)
- Wing area: 15.0 m^{2} (161 sq ft)
- Aspect ratio: 6:1
- Airfoil: USA-35B
- Empty weight: 472 kg (1,041 lb)
- Gross weight: 682 kg (1,504 lb)
- Fuel capacity: 45 L (12 US gal; 9.9 imp gal)
- Powerplant: 1 × Continental O-200-A air-cooled flat-four engine, 75 kW (100 hp)
- Propellers: 2-bladed McCauley fixed-pitch, 1.83 m (6 ft 0 in) diameter

Performance

- Maximum speed: 184 km/h (114 mph, 99 kn)
- Cruise speed: 144 km/h (89 mph, 78 kn)
- Range: 560 km (350 mi, 300 nmi)
- Service ceiling: 3,700 m (12,000 ft)
- Rate of climb: 3.0 m/s (600 ft/min)

== See also ==
- Piper J-3 Cub
- LIPNUR Kunang
- LIPNUR Super Kunang
- LIPNUR Sikumbang
