= LIPNUR Kumbang =

X-02 Kumbang

General information
- Type: Utility aircraft
- Manufacturer: Angkatan Udara Republik Indonesia, Depot Penjelidikan, Pertjobaan dan Pembuatan/LIPNUR
- Status: Project cancelled

The LIPNUR Kumbang was a project by Indonesia's aerospace industry to develop a locally produced four-seat utility aircraft. Work was cancelled before the aircraft actually flew. One source describes it as a rotary-wing design.

== Specifications ==
General characteristics

- Crew: one, pilot
- Capacity: 3 passengers
