= LIPNUR Kunang =

NU-25 Kunang
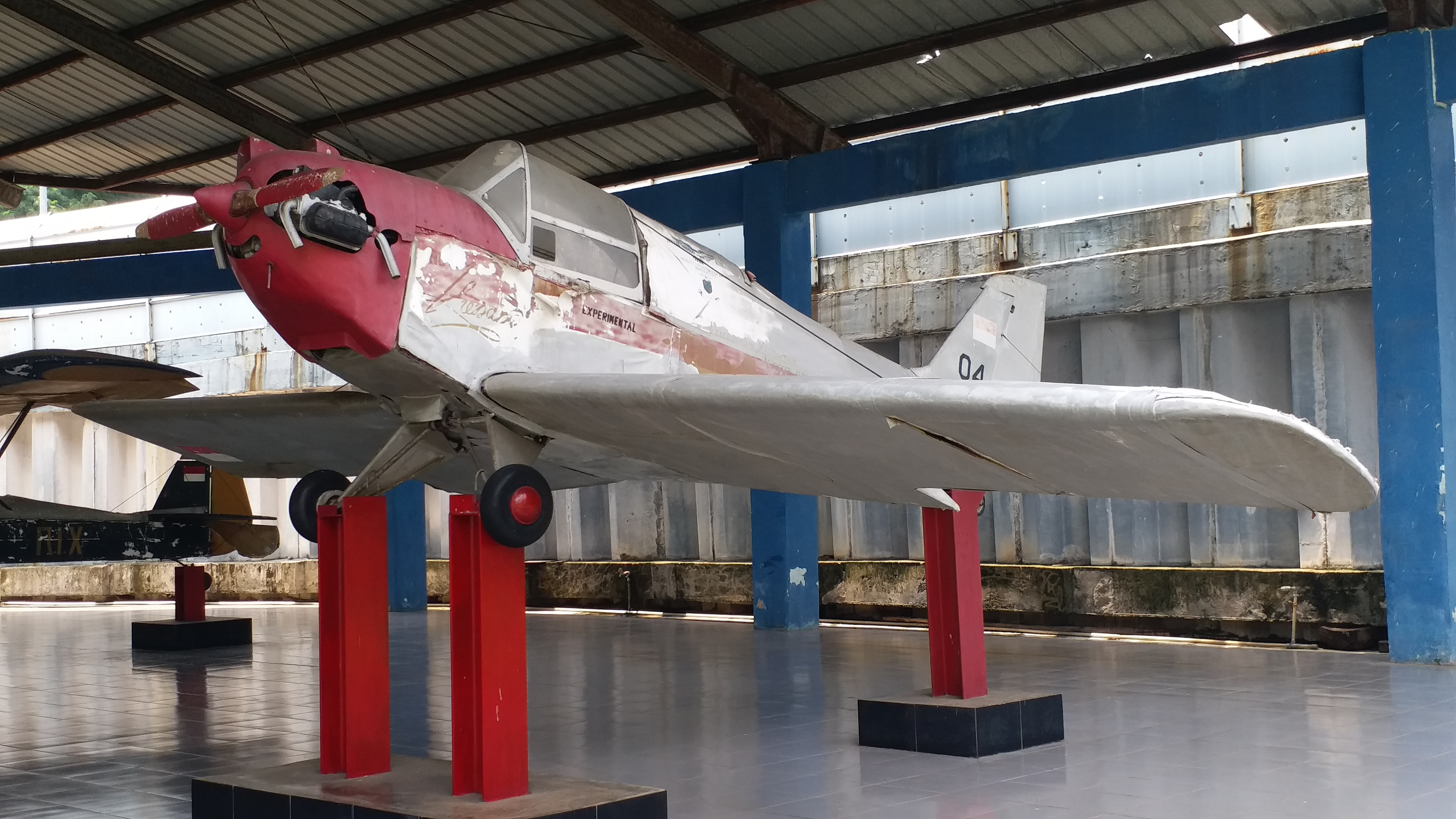
- LIPNUR Kunang at Satriamandala Museum, 2023

General information
- Type: Sports aircraft
- Manufacturer: Angkatan Udara Republik Indonesia, Depot Penjelidikan, Pertjobaan dan Pembuatan/LIPNUR
- Designer: Nurtanio Pringgoadisuryo (id)
- Status: Retired
- Number built: 1

History
- First flight: 2 November 1958
- Variants: LIPNUR Kunang, The original version LIPNUR Super Kunang, With more powerful engine Volkswagen with 36 horsepower

The LIPNUR Kunang was a single-seat sports aircraft built in Indonesia that first flew in 1958 in the hope that it would inspire interest in aviation amongst Indonesian youth. The only example that was built was subsequently grounded. It was a single-seat monoplane of conventional layout with fixed tailwheel undercarriage.

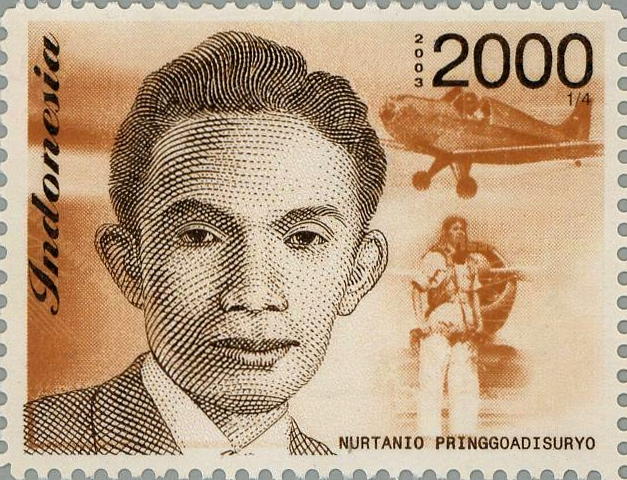
A stamp commemorating Nurtanio with NU-25 Kunang at the top right

== Aircraft on display ==
The sole prototype is now on display at the Satriamandala Museum, Jakarta. Some source claimed that the aircraft on display is a replica.

== Specifications ==
Data from Jane's All The World's Aircraft 1961–62

General characteristics

- Crew: 1
- Wingspan: 8.60 m (28 ft 3 in)
- Height: 1.77 m (5 ft 10 in)
- Wing area: 7.7 m^{2} (83 sq ft)
- Aspect ratio: 9.6:1
- Airfoil: NACA 2412
- Empty weight: 160 kg (353 lb)
- Gross weight: 260 kg (573 lb)
- Fuel capacity: 15 L (4.0 US gal; 3.3 imp gal)
- Powerplant: 1 × Volkswagen 4-cylinder air-cooled horizontally-opposed piston engine, 19 kW (25 hp)

Performance

- Cruise speed: 137 km/h (85 mph, 74 kn)

== See also ==
- LIPNUR Super Kunang
- LIPNUR Belalang
- LIPNUR Sikumbang
