= Fletcher FD-25 =

Light ground-attack aircraft

FD-25 Defender
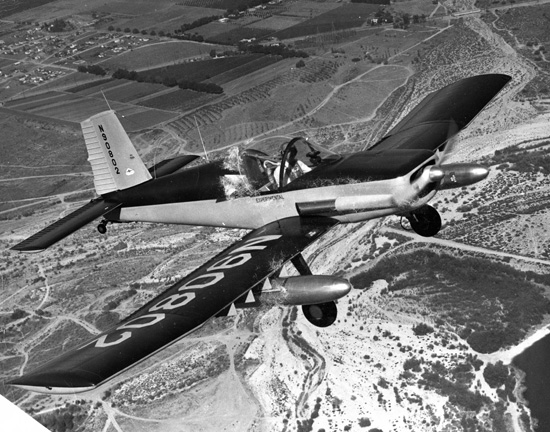

General information
- Type: Counterinsurgency aircraft
- Manufacturer: Fletcher
- Designer: John Thorp
- Primary users: Royal Cambodian Air Force Republic of Vietnam Air Force Royal Thai Police
- Number built: 13

History
- First flight: 1951

The Fletcher FD-25 Defender was a light ground-attack aircraft developed in the United States in the early 1950s.

== Design and development ==
Designed by John Thorp, the Defender was a conventional low-wing cantilever monoplane with fixed tailwheel undercarriage. Provision was made for two machine guns in the wings, plus disposable stores carried on underwing pylons. Construction throughout was all-metal, and the pilot sat under a wide perspex canopy.

== Operational history ==
Three prototypes were built, two single-seaters and a two-seater, but no orders were placed by the US military. In Japan, however, Toyo Aircraft Industry acquired the rights to the design, and built around a dozen aircraft, selling seven (five single-seater attack versions and two two-seat trainers) to Cambodia, and four to Vietnam. One example (FD-25B JA3051) served with the Royal Thai Police.

== Related development ==
The wing design of the Fletcher FU-24 aerial topdressing plane was loosely based on that of the FD-25 Defender. Almost 300 were built under licence in New Zealand from the mid-1950s and used for agricultural and skydiving operations.

== Surviving aircraft ==
One example (FD-25B N240D) remains in an airworthy condition today and appeared at the EAA AirVenture Oshkosh airshow in 2010. Two (a single-seater and a two-seater) are on museum display at the Tokyo Metropolitan College of Industrial Technology in Japan.

== Specifications ==
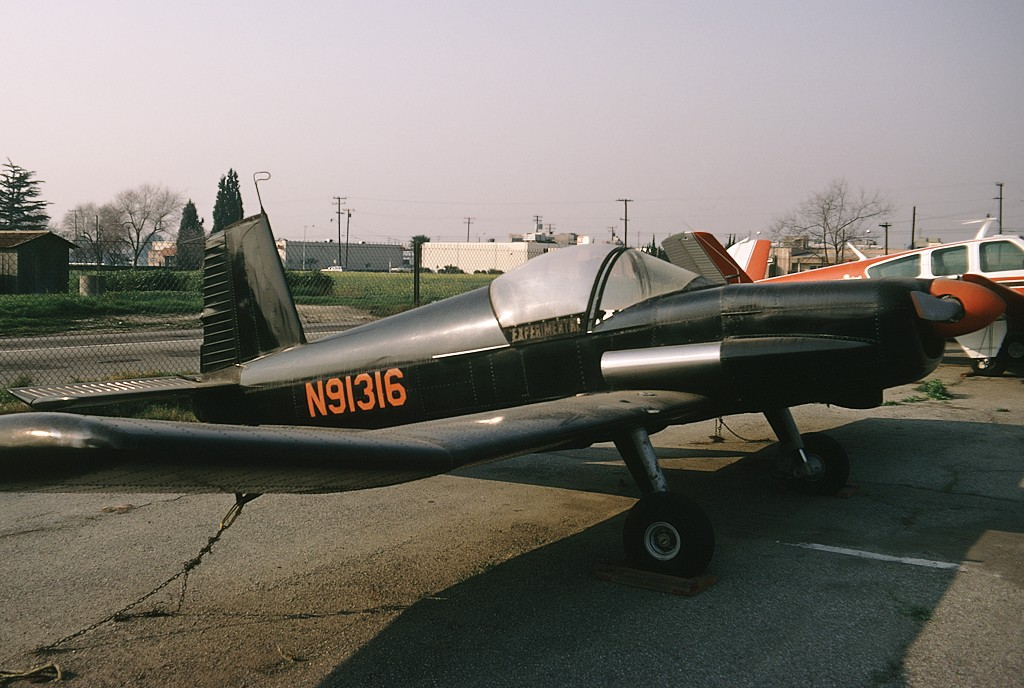
Fletcher Defender at Fullerton, California, in 1971

Data from Jane's All the World's Aircraft 1955–56

General characteristics

- Crew: 1
- Length: 20 ft 11 in (6.38 m)
- Wingspan: 30 ft 0 in (9.14 m)
- Height: 6 ft 3 in (1.91 m)
- Wing area: 150 sq ft (14 m^{2})
- Aspect ratio: 6:1
- Airfoil: NACA 65.5-415
- Empty weight: 1,228 lb (557 kg)
- Gross weight: 2,500 lb (1,134 kg)
- Fuel capacity: 60 US gal (50 imp gal; 230 L)
- Powerplant: 1 × Continental E-225-8 6-cylinder, air-cooled, horizontally-opposed pistonengine, 225 hp (168 kW)

Performance

- Maximum speed: 187 mph (301 km/h, 162 kn) at sea level
- Cruise speed: 162 mph (261 km/h, 141 kn)
- Range: 630 mi (1,010 km, 550 nmi)
- Service ceiling: 16,500 ft (5,000 m)
- Rate of climb: 1,725 ft/min (8.76 m/s)

Armament

- Guns: 2 × wing-mounted .30-in (7.62 mm) machine guns
- Rockets:
  - 40 × 2.75 inch rockets or
  - 4 × 5-inch rockets or
  - 20 × 8 cm rockets
- Bombs: 2 × 250 lb (113 kg) bombs

== See also ==
Aircraft of comparable role, configuration, and era

- SIAI Marchetti SF.260
- American Electric Piranha
- Soko J-20 Kraguj
- LIPNUR Sikumbang
