= Indonesian Aerospace =

Indonesian aerospace company

Indonesian Aerospace (IAe)
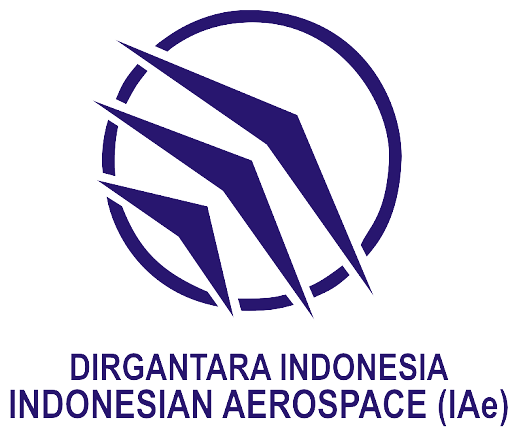
- Native name: PT Dirgantara Indonesia (Persero)
- Type: State-owned company
- Industry: Aerospace and Defense
- Founded: 23 August 1976 (as Nurtanio Aircraft Industry (Indonesian: Industri Pesawat Terbang Nurtanio)
- Headquarters: Bandung, West Java, Indonesia
- Area served: Worldwide
- Products: Commercial Airliners; Military aircraft Aircraft Component; Aircraft Services; Defense; Engineering
- Number of employees: 3,689 (2021)
- Parent: PT Len Industri
- Website: indonesian-aerospace.com

Indonesian Aerospace (IAe; Indonesian: PT Dirgantara Indonesia), is an Indonesian aerospace company involved in aircraft design and the development and manufacture of civilian and military regional commuter aircraft, and a subsidiary of state-owned electronics manufacturer Len Industri. The company was formerly known as PT Industri Pesawat Terbang Nusantara (Persero) (IPTN; lit. 'Nusantara Aircraft Industry (State-owned) Limited'). It was expanded from a research and industrial facility under the auspices of the Indonesian Air Force, namely Lembaga Industri Penerbangan Nurtanio (LIPNUR) or Nurtanio Aviation Industry Institute.

Established in 1976 as a state owned company, it has developed its capability as an aircraft manufacturer and diversified into other areas, such as telecommunication, automotive, maritime, information technology, oil & gas, control & automation, military, simulation technology, industrial turbine, and engineering services.

== History ==
=== Pioneering ===
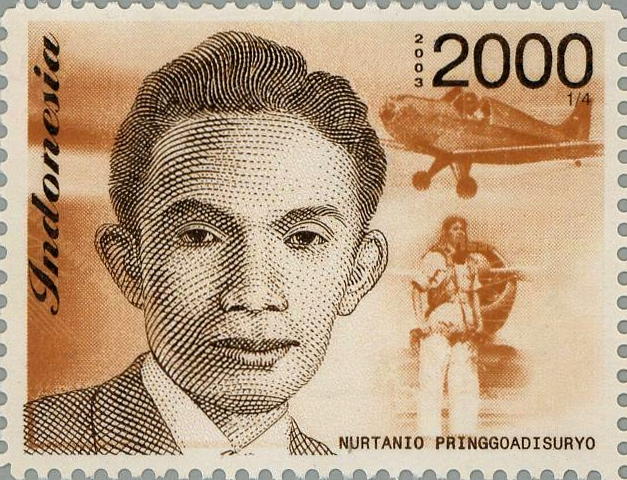
Nurtanio Pringgoadisuryo

Though aircraft production in Indonesia existed before independence in 1945, the National Aviation Industry was pioneered in 1946 at Yogyakarta by the formation of Planning and Construction Bureau (Indonesian: Biro Rencana dan Konstruksi) within the Indonesian Air Force. Wiweko Soepono, Nurtanio Pringgoadisurjo, and J. Sumarsono, opened a simple workshop at Magetan, near Madiun. With basic materials, gliders were designed and built – Zogling, NWG-1 (Nurtanio Wiweko Glider) among others.

In 1948, a motorised aircraft, WEL-X was built by Wiweko Soepono using a Harley Davidson engine. The small craft was registered as RI-X. This era marked the rise of several aeromodelling clubs.

The war for independence, however, halted all progress until 1953. In that year, The Experimental Section (Indonesian: Seksi Percobaan) was organised. Consisting of only 15 personnel, led by Nurtanio Pringgoadisurjo, The team built and tested three prototypes of a single-seat all metal aircraft at Andir Airport (Later renamed Husein Sastranegara International Airport) in Bandung.

On 24 April 1957, The Experimental Section graduated into The Inspection, Trial, and Production Sub-Depot (Indonesian: Sub Depot Penyelidikan, Percobaan dan Pembuatan) based on Decision Letter of Indonesian Air Force Chief of Staff number 68.

In 1958, a light training aircraft prototype named Belalang 89, or Grasshopper 89, was flown. The design was later produced as Belalang 90. Five Belalang 90 were built and used for military training. Within the same year, a sport plane, "Kunang 25", was also built and flown.

=== Preparation ===
On 1 August 1960, by the order of the Chief of Staff of the Indonesian Air Force (order #488), The Aviation Industry Preparation Agency was to be formed to establish the Indonesian aviation industry as part of national strategies on national industrial production. By 16 December 1961, the new body, known as LAPIP (Lembaga Persiapan Industri Penerbangan), was actively negotiating for technological transfers and contracts.

LAPIP was able to secure a joint licensing and production contract with the Polish People's Republic (through the latter's foreign trade monopoly, the Complete Industrial Facilities Export Centre (CEKOP)). Within the same year, Indonesia was producing the PZL-104 Wilga, locally named the Gelatik. 44 were manufactured for agriculture, transport, and aero club purposes.

In 1965, the Aircraft Industry Project Implementation Command (Komando Pelaksana Proyek Industri Pesawat Terbang; KOPELAPIP) and the Independent Aircraft Industry National Company (PN. Industri Pesawat Terbang Berdikari) were formed to expand and formulate specific uses of the young aviation industry.

Within the same timeline, Aviation Studies were promoted in the country's top universities. One of the first schools was founded within the machine department of the engineering faculty of the Bandung Institute of Technology by Oetarjo Diran and Liem Keng Kie.

In September 1974, Pertamina's Advanced Technology Division signed a license contract with MBB and CASA for producing Bölkow Bo 105 and CASA C.212 Aviocar.

=== Nurtanio Aircraft Industry ===
On 26 April 1976, mandated by Government Act No. 15, in Jakarta, PT Industri Pesawat Terbang Nurtanio was officially established with BJ. Habibie as the president and CEO. The infrastructure was completed and inaugurated on 23 August 1976 by President Suharto. The new body was a merger between Nurtanio Aviation Industry Institution (Lembaga Industri Penerbangan Nurtanio/LIPNUR) and Pertamina's Advanced Technology Division.

The name 'Nurtanio' is a tribute to Nurtanio Pringgoadisuryo, one of the first aviation pioneers in Indonesia, who designed the Sikumbang, an indigenous all metal aircraft (maiden flight: 1 August 1954). As a result of his death caused by a flight training accident on 1 March 1966, the Aviation Industry Preparation Agency was then renamed Nurtanio Aviation Industry Institution LLC (Indonesian: Lembaga Industri Penerbangan Nurtanio (Abbreviated as LIPNUR)).

Initially, IPTN manufactured the NBO 105 (MBB Bo 105) under license from MBB, followed by the NC 212 (CASA C-212 Aviocar), under license by CASA.

=== Nusantara Aircraft Industry ===
On 11 October 1985, the name PT Industri Pesawat Terbang Nurtanio was changed to the PT Industri Pesawat Terbang Nusantara or IPTN. Nusantara signifies the Indonesian 17,000 island archipelago.

The exclusion of "Nurtanio" from IPTN was due to some highly questionable accusations. One of the allegations was a personal use of company's letterhead by Nurtanio's family to appropriate some IPTN stocks. None was proven true.

=== Dirgantara Indonesia / Indonesian Aerospace ===
Following the 1997 Asian financial crisis, a major restructuring program was implemented. At its peak, in 2004, the Indonesian Aerospace reduced its payroll from 9670 to 3720. Furthermore, the 18 business divisions were reorganised into the following:

- Aircraft
- Aircraft Services
- Aerostructure
- Defense
- Engineering Services

The restructuring focused on new business goals, downsizing and adaptation of man-power according to available workloads, and a pinpoint market targeting along with a concentrated business mission.

The IPTN was re-introduced as PT Dirgantara Indonesia (abbreviated DI) or Indonesian Aerospace (abbreviated IAe). IAe was officially inaugurated by the president of Indonesia, Abdurrahman Wahid, in Bandung on 24 August 2000.

On 4 July 2011, Indonesia's government said it will inject Rp.2 trillion ($234 million) to Indonesian Aerospace to keep the debt-ridden firm afloat with a view to making a joint venture with EADS. Before injection, the amount of unpaid debt to the government was Rp.1.1 trillion ($129 million).

== Services ==
- Engineering work packages; design, development, testing
- Manufacturing subcontracts
- Aircraft Maintenance Repair and Overhaul (MRO)
- Engine Maintenance and Overhaul (MRO)

== Facilities ==
Indonesian Aerospace covers an area of 86.98 ha. The backbone of the production is sustained by 232 high tech operations. Apart from these, there are other minor high-tech facilities spread over various assembly lines, laboratories, and service & maintenance units. They are located mainly in Bandung.

Starting in August 2026, PT Dirgantara Indonesia (PTDI) will begin relocating its main manufacturing facilities from Bandung to Kertajati International Airport, Majalengka, on a new industrial site covering approximately 150–200 hectares. The relocation follows the Memorandum of Understanding (MoU) signed between PT Dirgantara Indonesia (PTDI) and PT Bandarudara Internasional Jawa Barat (BIJB) on 15 July 2026, reflecting both parties' shared commitment to developing the Kertajati area into one of Indonesia's leading aerospace industrial hubs. The new complex is planned to support aircraft manufacturing, final assembly, maintenance, research and development, and future expansion of Indonesia's aerospace industry, while strengthening Kertajati's role as a strategic national aviation and aerospace center.

== Products ==
=== Indonesian Aerospace and its precursors ===
(PT Dirgantara Indonesia (DI) – (IAe) Indonesian Aerospace)

==== AURI ====
(Angkatan Udara Republik Indonesia, Depot Penjelidikan, Pertjobaan dan Pembuatan – Indonesian Air Force Research, Development, and Production Depot)

- NU-200 Sikumbang
- NU-225 Sikumbang (X-09)
- NU-260 Sikumbang (X-02)
- Belalang 85 (X-03) – converted Piper J-3 Cub
- Belalang 90 – converted Piper J-3 Cub
- Kunang 25 (X-04)
- Super Kunang 35 (X-05 and X-07)
- Kindjeng 150 (X-06)
- B-8m Kolentang – based on Bensen B-8

==== LIPNUR ====
(Lembaga Industri Penerbangan Nurtanio – Nurtanio Aviation Industry Institution)

- LIPNUR Gelatik (License-built PZL-104 Wilga)
- LIPNUR LT-200 Angkatang (License-built Pazmany PL-2)
- LIPNUR Belalang
- LIPNUR Kindjeng
- LIPNUR Kolentang
- LIPNUR Kumbang
- LIPNUR Kunang
- LIPNUR Kunang-kunang
- LIPNUR Manyang
- LIPNUR Sikumbang
- LIPNUR Super Kunang I
- LIPNUR Super Kunang II

==== IAe Aircraft production ====
- CASA/IPTN CN235 civil, military, and maritime version (Joint development with CASA under Aircraft Technology (Airtech)).
- Indonesian Aerospace CN295 (Variant of C-295 made by Indonesian Aerospace).
- Indonesian Aerospace N219 is a 19-seat commercial turboprop aircraft. First flew in August 2017, it was certified by Indonesian Directorate General of Civil Aviation in December 2020. IAe (PT DI) has received 257 orders of N219 from abroad and domestic.
- Indonesian Aerospace N245 is a planned 50-seat commercial turboprop aircraft. In mid 2018, IAe (PT DI) completed wind tunnel testing and finalized the design.
- Indonesian Aerospace IPTN N250 is a 50-seat commercial turboprop aircraft.
- Indonesian Aerospace IPTN N2130 was a proposed 80-130-seat commuter airliner now cancelled after the Asian Financial Crisis.
- Elang Hitam is a medium-altitude long-endurance unmanned aerial vehicle currently being developed.

Joint Development & production aircraft

- KAI KF-X, Joint Development South Korea & Indonesia Government, with development cost sharing consisted of 20 percent Indonesian Government and 80 percent South Korea. KAI and IAe (PTDI) are appointed as System Integrator. KAI KF-X is a multirole fighter. Currently in prototype development phase.

License-built aircraft

- NAS 330J, a licensed built Aérospatiale Puma helicopter, first made in 1981.
- NAS 332, a licensed built Eurocopter Super Puma helicopter, first made in 1983.
- Eurocopter EC725, 6 helicopters for Indonesian Air Force.
- NB 412, a licensed built Bell 412 helicopter made since 1984.
- NBO 105, a licensed built Bölkow Bo 105 helicopter, discontinued in July 2011 after 123 units production since 1976.
- NBK 117, a licensed built MBB/Kawasaki BK 117, first produced in 1981.
- Eurocopter Fennec as replacement of NBO 105 production line.
- Eurocopter Ecureuil as replacement of NBO 105 production line.
- NC212, a licensed built CASA C-212 Aviocar aircraft.

=== IAe Armaments ===
- FFAR 2.75 inch rocket under Belgium's license.
- SUT torpedo.
- NDL-40 Ground-to-Ground Rocket Multi Launcher.
- R-Han 122 rocket munition.
- RN01-SS

== Development projects ==
Indonesian Aerospace has plans to construct the N245, designed to carry 50 passengers for about 400 kilometres in remote areas or where passenger demand is low. The design is based primarily on that of the CN235, with body shape and tail modifications. The development cost of the aircraft has thus far reached $150 million, with an expected break even point of 50–70 aircraft sales. The aircraft is meant as a market competitor to the ATR 42 and Bombardier Dash 8 Q300.

== See also ==
- Aviation in Indonesia
- Science and technology in Indonesia
- Philippine Aerospace Development Corporation
- Aerospace Industrial Development Corporation
