= American Electric Piranha =

Counter-insurgency aircraft

Piranha
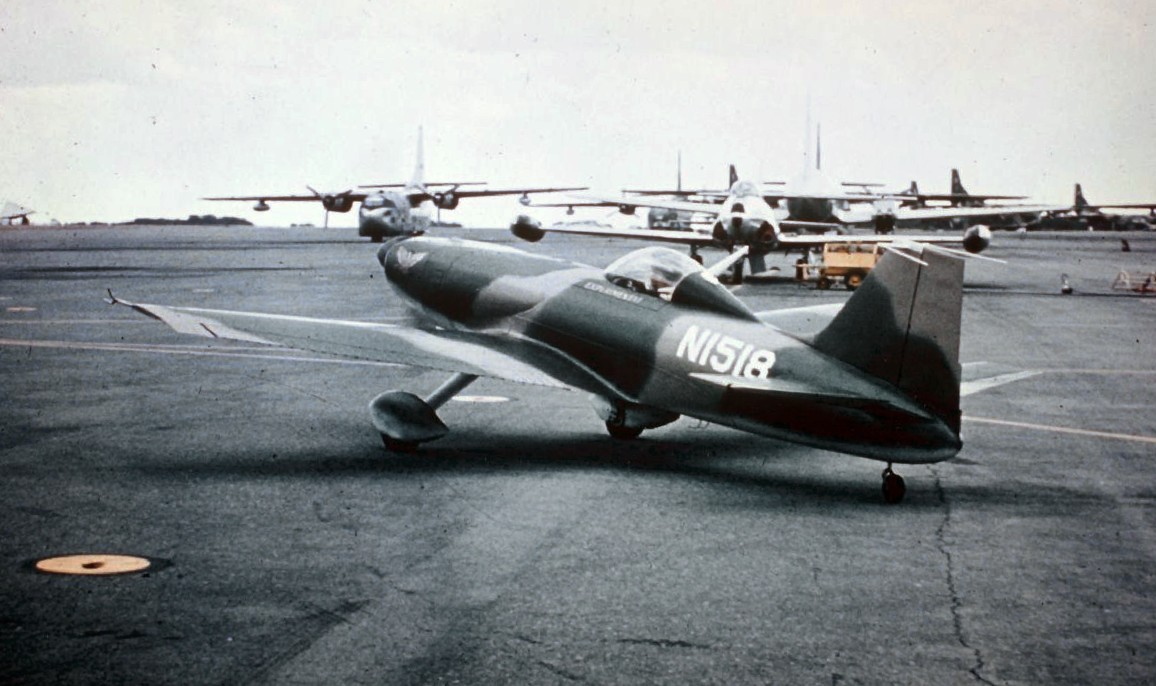

General information
- Type: Counter-insurgency aircraft
- National origin: United States
- Manufacturer: American Electric Corporation
- Designer: Milt Blair

History
- First flight: 1966
- Developed from: LeVier Cosmic Wind

The American Electric Piranha (also named Blair-American USA or American USA) was a prototype American counter-insurgency aircraft. Designed by Milton Blair and Richard Ennis in the early 1960s, the project was financed by the American Electric Corporation.

Developed for use by the United States Air Force under Project Little Brother, initial flight testing of the Piranha took place at Mojave Airport in California; following delivery for evaluation, it was tested at Eglin Air Force Base in Florida. The design armament of the Piranha was two pods each carrying four Zuni unguided rockets, mounted on the aircraft's wingtips, and a single 500-pound (230 kg) bomb on a belly hardpoint.

Development of the Piranha ceased following the death of Milton Blair in an unrelated aircraft accident. The prototype, N1518, is flown by a private owner in Kansas.

== Specifications ==
Data from Sport Aviation

General characteristics

- Crew: one
- Wing area: 70 sq ft (6.5 m^{2})
- Gross weight: 3,200 lb (1,451 kg)

Armament

- Hardpoints: 1 with a capacity of 500 pounds (230 kg)
- Rockets: 2 4-round 5.0-inch (127 mm) Zuni rocket pods

== See also ==
Related development

- LeVier Cosmic Wind

Aircraft of comparable role, configuration, and era

- Fletcher FD-25 Defender
