= LIPNUR Super Kunang =

Super Kunang

General information
- Type: Sports aircraft
- National origin: Indonesian
- Manufacturer: Angkatan Udara Republik Indonesia, Depot Penjelidikan, Pertjobaan dan Pembuatan/LIPNUR

History
- First flight: 25 October 1963

LIPNUR developed and manufactured the Super Kunang - also known as the Super Kunang 35 - in the 1960s. Powered by a Volkswagen air-cooled engine and seating only one person, it was used as a light sports plane.

Kunang-Kunang means 'Firefly' in Indonesian.

== Development ==
The prototype Super Kunang I (X-05) first flew on 25 October 1963. In production, it was known as the Super Kunang 35.
Both the prototype and a 2-seat variant (see below) were exhibited at the National Research Exhibition in Jakarta (1-13 July 1965).

== Variants ==
A two-seat prototype, the Super Kunang II (X-07), was flown on 15 January 1965 but doesn't seem to have gone into production.

== Specifications ==
from
General characteristics

- Crew: one
- Length: 20 ft 0 in (6.10 m)
- Wingspan: 25 ft 0 in (7.62 m)
- Height: 5 ft 0 in (1.52 m)
- Wing area: 107 sq ft (9.94 m^{2})
- Empty weight: 506 lb (229.5 kg)
- Gross weight: 726 lb (329.3 kg)
- Powerplant: 1 × Volkswagen , 36 hp (26.8 kW)

Performance

- Cruise speed: 80 mph (129 km/h, 70 kn)
- Rate of climb: 460 ft/min (2.33 m/s)
