= 1908 Prohibition National Convention =

American political convention

- 1908 presidential election

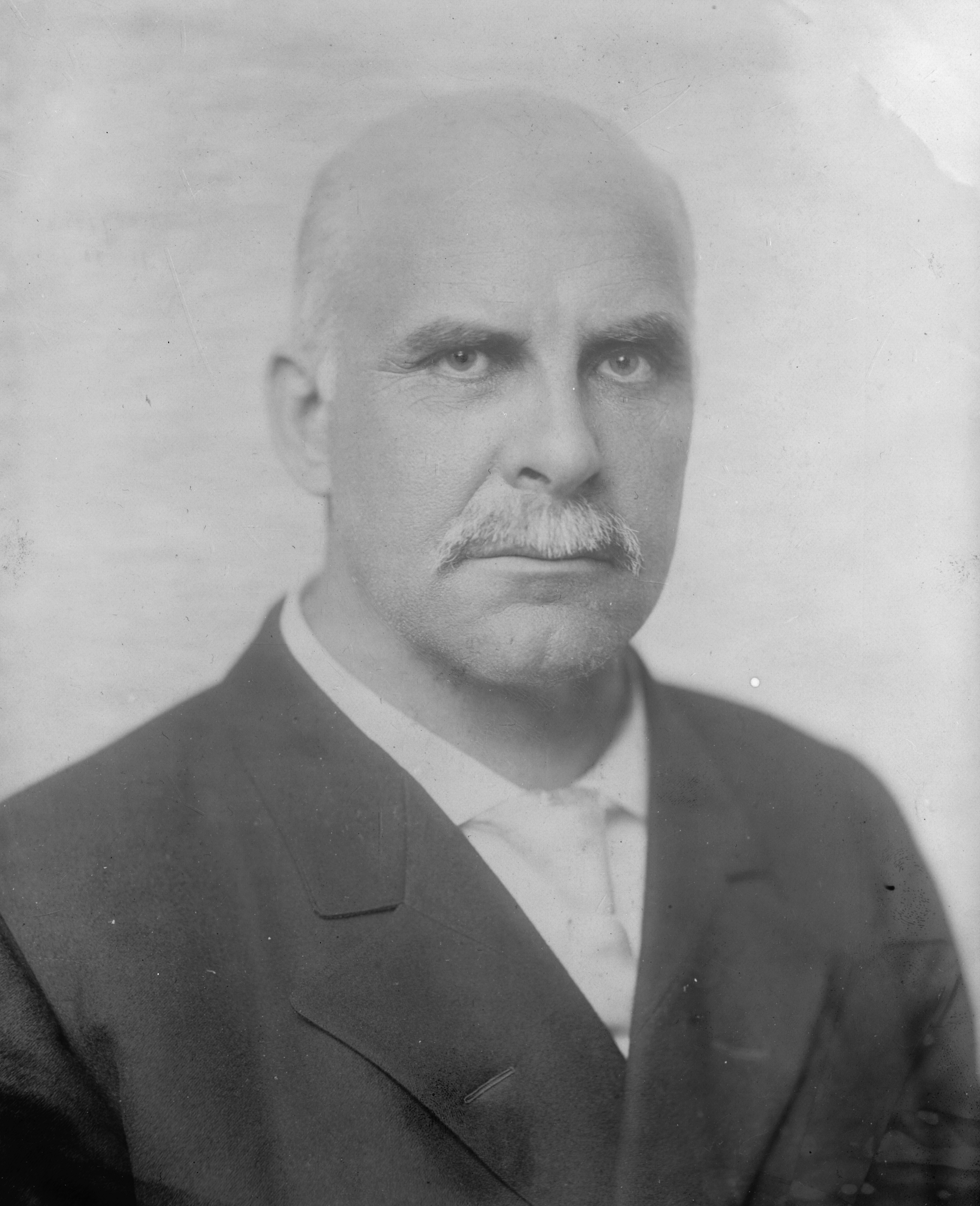
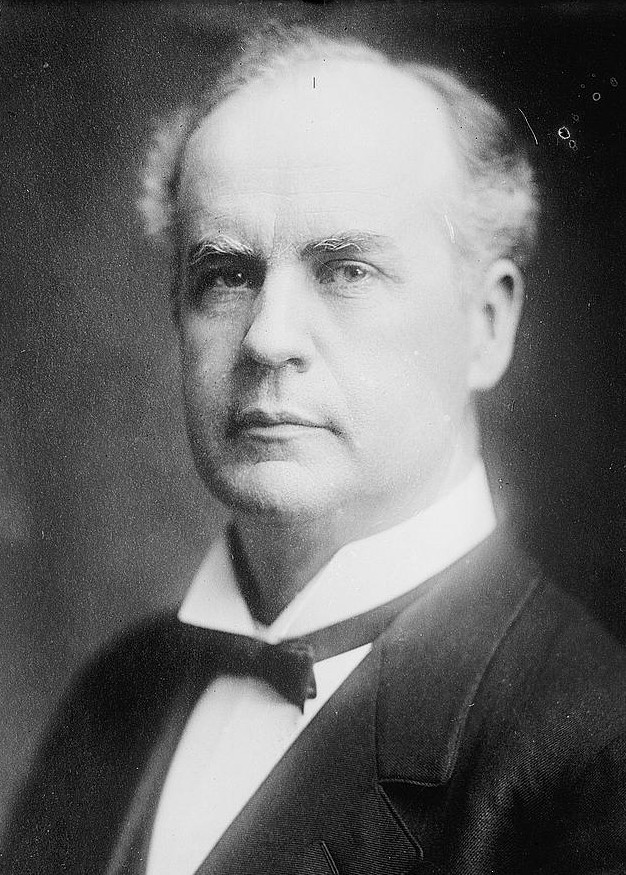
- Nominees (Chafin & Watkins)

Convention
- Date(s): July 15–16, 1908
- City: Columbus, Ohio
- Venue: Franklin County Memorial Hall

Candidates
- Presidential nominee: Eugene W. Chafin of Illinois
- Vice-presidential nominee: Aaron S. Watkins of Ohio

Voting
- Total delegates: 1,087

The 1908 Prohibition National Convention was held at Franklin County Memorial Hall in Columbus, Ohio, July 15–16, 1916. It nominated Eugene W. Chafin for president and Aaron S. Watkins for vice president.

== Logistics ==
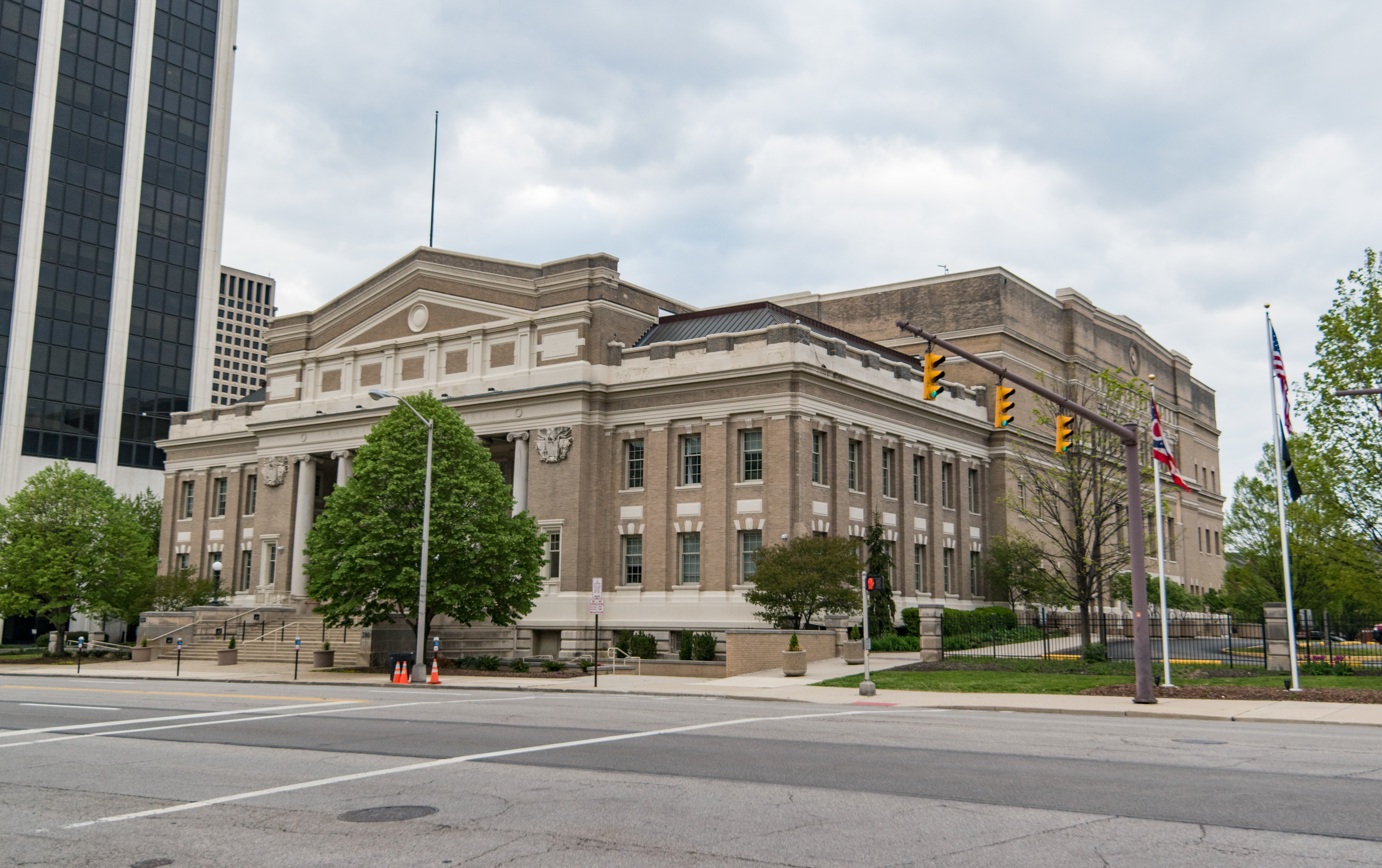
Franklin County Memorial Hall, venue of the convention (photographed in 2020)

Cover page for official publication of convention

The convention was held in Columbus, Ohio. The general sessions of the convention were held each evening at Franklin County Memorial Hall. The convention was held July 15 and 16.

Upon arriving in the city, delegates were escorted from Union Station to their hotels by a brass band sitting on a water sprinkler vehicle (a literal "water wagon", playing on a euphemism for alcohol abstinence).

== Presidential nomination ==
Heading into the convention, indications arose that the presidential balloting could be contentious. Some party leaders sought to nominate a ticket that included a Southern Democrat and Northern Republican.

Mentioned as possible candidates ahead of the convention were:

- James B. Cranfill of Texas, Prohibition Party's 1892 vice presidential nominee
- Alfred L. Mannierre of New York
- William B. Palmore of Missouri, reverend and editor of The St. Louis Christian Advocate
- Daniel P. Sheen of Illinois, then-candidate for the party's nomination in the Illinois gubernatorial election
- Joseph P. Tracy of Michigan
- Frederick F. Wheeler of California

The convention nominated Eugene W. Chafin of Illinois. Chafin was also a contender, at the time, for the party's nomination in the Illinois gubernatorial election.

The nomination for president took three ballots. The top failed competitor was considered to have been William B. Palmore, who received many votes on the first ballot but placed weakly on the third (once it became clear Chafin was headed towards securing the nomination). Chafin did not receive strong support on the first ballot, receiving only 195 of 1,083 votes. His support increased on the second ballot. His state, Illinois, had largely cast its votes for Daniel R. Sheen on the first ballot. However, on the third ballot, Illinois's delegation flipped to Chafin. Also flipping to Chafin on the third ballot were the Indiana, New York, and Wisconsin delegations. Receiving 636 votes on the third ballot. After Chafin secured the nomination, the convention voted to make his nomination unanimous.

Presidential vote (Note: Information on the actual balloting is conflicting. The New York Times reported that when the National Committee met in 1907 they had allotted for 1,508 delegates to the National Convention, but there were only reportedly 1,083 and 1,087 votes on the first and second ballots for President respectively. This also clashes with those results reported by "Ohio Elects the President", where it is posited there were 1,025 votes cast on the first ballot and 1,273 votes cast on the second.)
Candidate	1st	2nd	3rd	Unanimous
√ Eugene W. Chafin	195	376	636	1,087
William A. Palmore	273	418	415	-
Alfred L. Manierre	159	121	4	-
Daniel R. Sheen	124	157	12	-
Joseph P. Tracy	105	81	7	-
Frederick F. Wheeler	72	73	-	-
Oliver W. Stewart	61	47	-	-
James B. Cranfill	28	-	-	-
George R. Stewart	7	-	-	-
Charles Scanlon	1	-	-	-

=== Chafin notification and acceptance of nomination in Chicago (July 18) ===
Chafin was formally notified of his nomination and accepted it on July 18 at a meeting held at Chicago's Music Hall. The speech formally notifying him was delivered by Charles Scanlon. The meeting was attended by many top Prohibition Party officials. Party Chairman Charles S. Jones called the notification meeting to order, with Samuel Dickie serving as the meeting's chairman. Among the other speakers at the meeting were Clinton N. Howard (New York activist), Felix T. McWhirter (treasurer of the national party), and Daniel R. Sheen.

In his acceptance speech, Chafin declared

If one or more political parties are to be kept in power twenty-five or fifty years, each succeeding administration carrying out the policy of the past and refusing to enact into law the progress attained, then such party or parties have violated the very spirit of our Constitution and turned our democracy into despotism, making the political boss[es] dictator[s]...We are dangerously near that condition of things into epending presidential campaign. The attempt made by Republicans and Democrats to create a fictitious issue is the most farcical in our history in the face of the fact that the question of prohibition of the liquor traffic has attracted wider attention of the press and people than all other public issues combined. The calm though and common sense of the moral citizenship have pronounced [a] sentence of death upon the liquor traffic, and the only thing that stays its execution is the protecting care of these two old political parties kept alive by blind political prejudice.

== Vice presidential nomination ==
The convention initially voted to nominate William B. Palmore for vice president. However, he declined this nomination. It then proposed to nominate Aaron S. Watkins (a professor from Ohio) for vice president by acclamation. The delegates were eager to adjourn in time to catch early evening trains home from Columbus, thus Watkins was a compromise choice to whom there was hope there might be no opposition. However, various delegates brought force various motions that delayed the nomination vote, and ultimately forced a vote by ballot to be taken for vice president.

Three candidates were put forth in the vote: Watkins, T. B. Demaree of Kentucky, and Charles S. Holler of Indiana. Watkins's nomination prevailed with an overwhelming nomination, and the convention then adopted a motion by the Kentucky delegation to consider his nomination unanimous.

Vice presidential vote
Candidate	Unanimous	1st	Unanimous
√ Aaron S. Watkins	-	?	1,087
William A. Palmore	1,087	-	-
T. B. Demaree	-	?	-
Charles S. Holler	-	?	-

== Notable speakers ==
On the opening day of the convention, several former presidential nominees of the party spoke to the convention. This included former John St. John (former governor of Kansas), Joshua Levering, Silas C. Swallow, and John G. Woolley.
