= Hunkins =

Hunkins is a surname. It may refer to:

- Eusebia Hunkins (1902-1980), American composer

The Massachusetts-Wisconsin Hunkins family:

- Robert Hunkins, Sr. (born 1679), a snowshoe soldier and Hunkins family progenitor
- Robert Hastings Hunkins (born 1774), a historical figure known for being a Wisconsin territory early settler
- Benjamin Hunkins (born 1810), an early Wisconsin politician who had a role in shaping the Wisconsin constitution

== See also ==
- The surname Hunkin
