= 1912 Prohibition National Convention =

American political convention

- 1912 presidential election

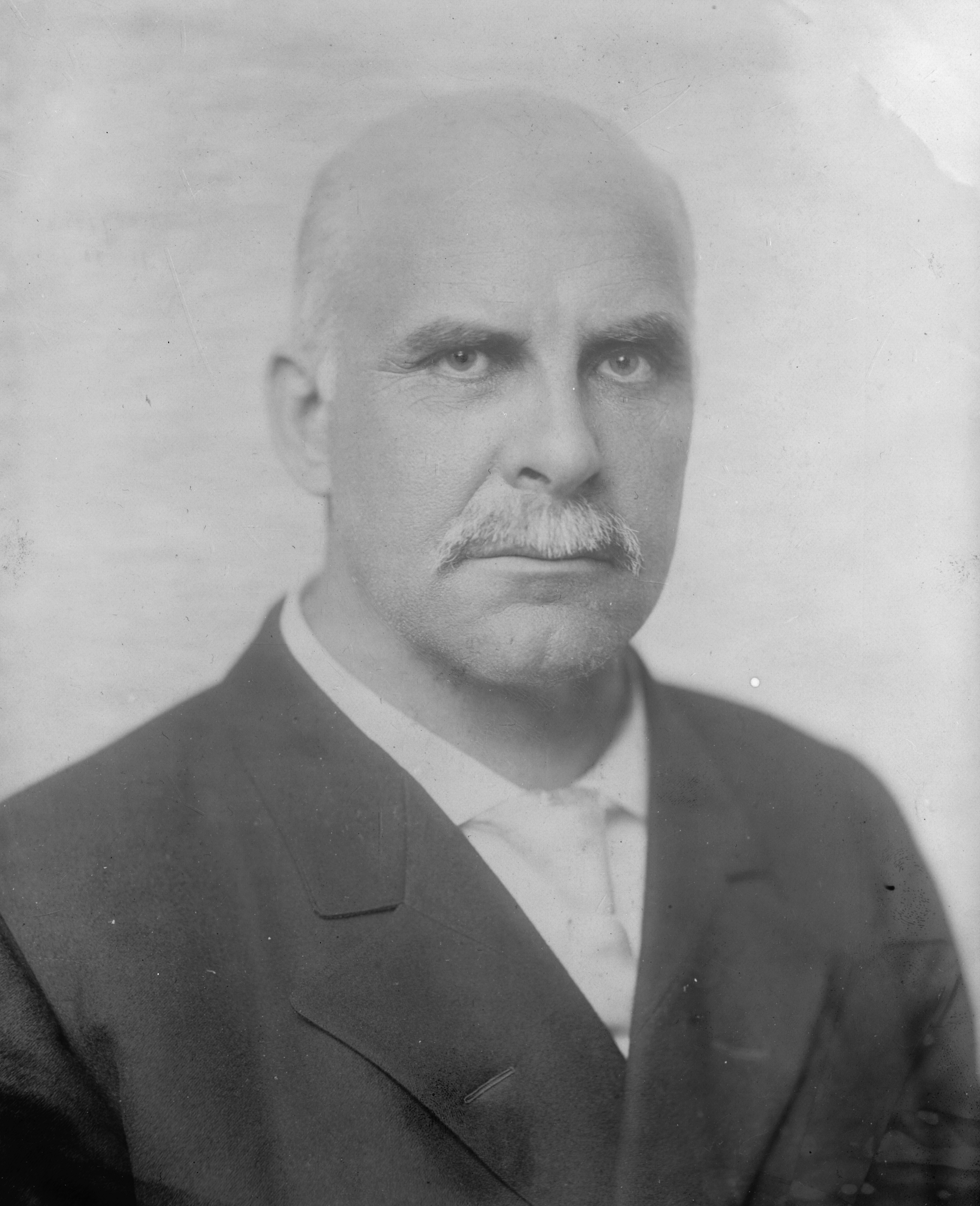
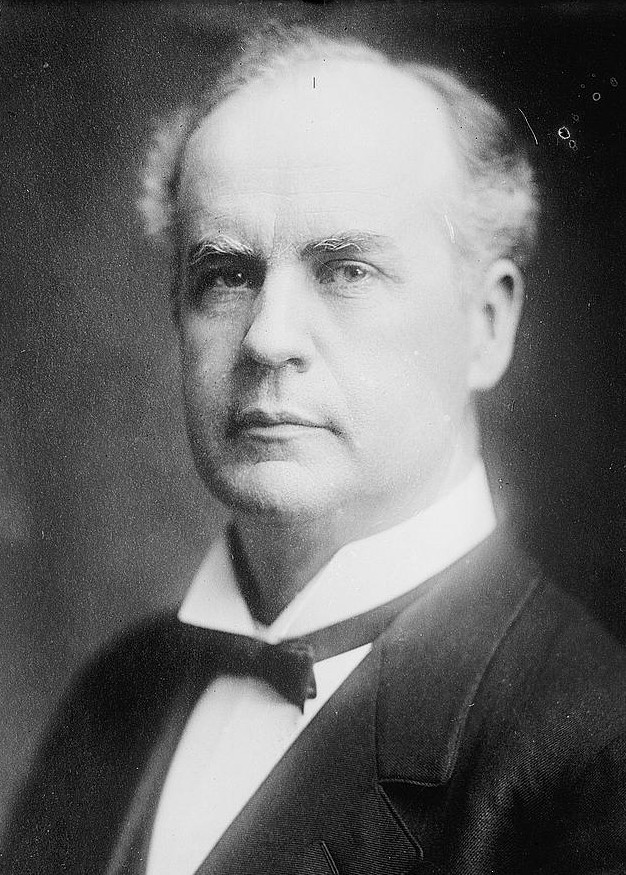
- Nominees (Chafin & Watkins)

Convention
- Date(s): July 10–12, 1912
- City: Atlantic City, New Jersey
- Venue: Steel Pier
- Keynote speaker: Clinton N. Howard of New York

Candidates
- Presidential nominee: Eugene W. Chafin of Arizona
- Vice-presidential nominee: Aaron S. Watkins of Ohio

The 1912 Prohibition National Convention was held July 10–12, 1912, at Steel Pier in Atlantic City, New Jersey. It nominated Eugene W. Chafin for president and Aaron S. Watkins for vice president, the same ticket that the Prohibition Party had nominated in the previous presidential election.

== Logistics ==
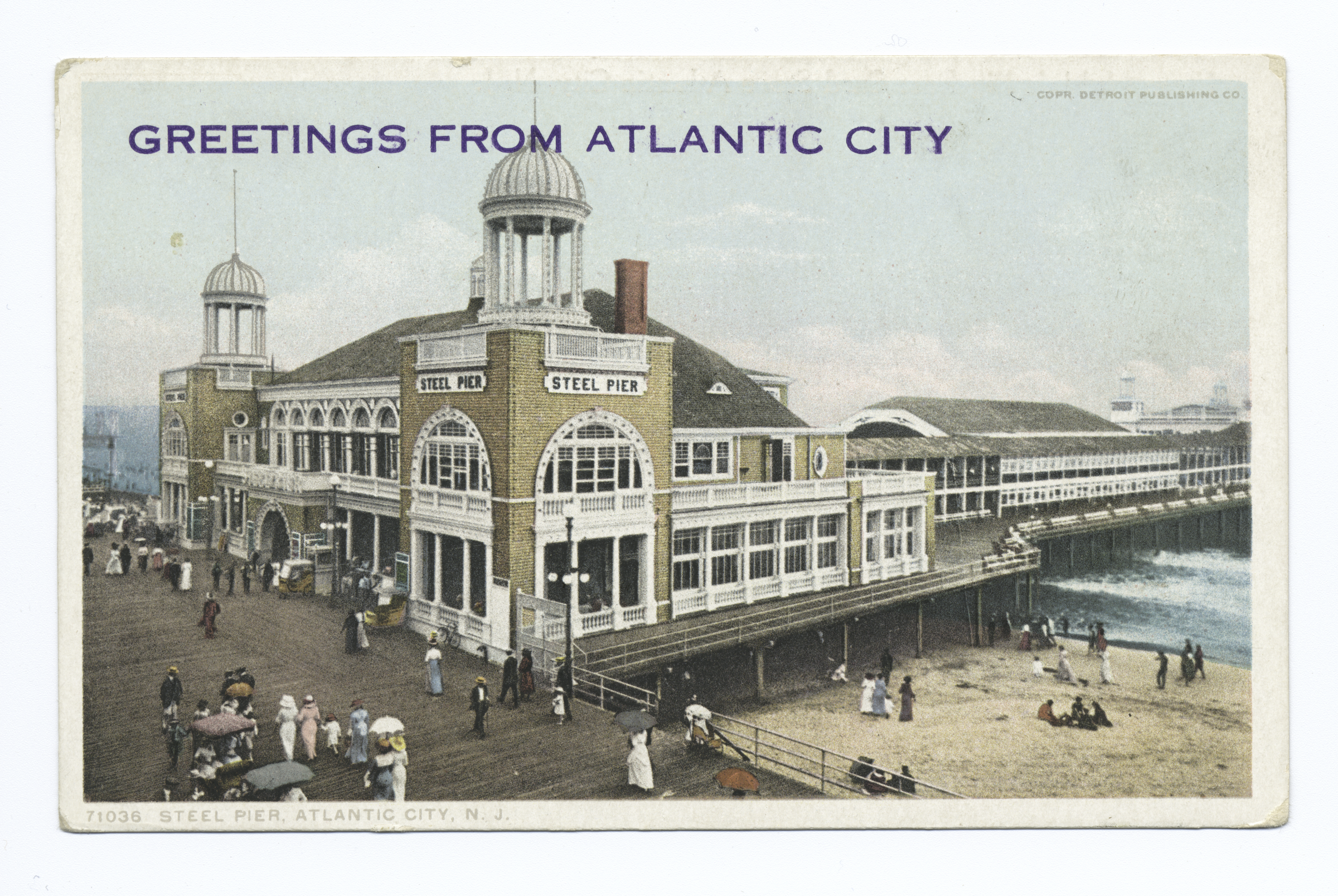
Postcard of Steel Pier, the location of the convention

The convention was held July 10–12, 1912, at Steel Pier in Atlantic City, New Jersey. The more than 1,000 delegates were housed at hotels in the oceanside resort city.

The keynote speech was delivered during its opening session by the convention's temporary chairman, Clinton N. Howard of New York.

== Chairman election ==
After a decade as party chairman, Charles R. Jones of Illinois was retiring from the position. Heading into the convention, W.G. Calderwood (head of the Minnesota state party) was regarded to be a front-runner to succeed him, due to the large growth in membership that his state's party had seen during the eight years in which he had headed it.

On July 11, the convention voted on a party chairman, with the vote proving contentious. On the fourth ballot, the delegates compromised on Virgil G. Hinshaw of Oregon.

== Presidential and vice presidential nominations ==
Ahead of the convention, Charles Scanlon of Pennsylvania was speculated as a likely nominee for the Prohibition Party in 1912.

Eugene W. Chafin of Arizona (Note: at the time of his nomination in 1908, Chafin had lived in Illinois; by 1912 he had moved to Arizona) was nominated for president, beating out four other contenders (including Andrew Jackson Houston). Chafin had been the party's presidential nominee in the previous presidential election, as well.

For vice president, the convention nominated Aaron S. Watkins of Ohio, who had been its vice presidential nominee in the previous election.

== Platform ==
The party platform adopted at the convention was 425 words. In addition to its advocacy for alcohol prohibition; the platform also supported women's suffrage; the direct-election of U.S. senators (Note: at the time, the Seventeenth Amendment to the United States Constitution was still in the process of being adopted); lengthening presidential terms to six years while also limiting presidents to a single term; abolishing child labor in mines, factories, and workshops.

== See also ==
- 1964 Democratic National Convention –also held in Atlantic City
