= Tornado outbreak of May 10–12, 2014 =

May 2014 severe weather event in the United States

- Loop of storms across portions of northern Kansas and southern Nebraska on May 11

Meteorological history
- Duration: May 10–12, 2014

Tornado outbreak
- Tornadoes: 44 confirmed
- Max. rating: EF3 tornado
- Duration: 2 days, 6 hours, 30 minutes
- Highest winds: Tornadic – 150 mph (240 km/h) (Sutton, Nebraska EF3 on May 11) (Per the NOAA Damage Assessment Toolkit, a 152 mph (245 km/h) damage rating was issued for the Beaver Crossing, Nebraska EF3 on May 11)
- Highest gusts: Non-tornadic – 122 mph (196 km/h) (Seward County, Nebraska on May 11)

Winter storm
- Max. snowfall: Snow – 43 in (110 cm) at Sierra Madre Mountains, Wyoming

Extratropical cyclone
- Lowest pressure: 992 hPa (mbar); 29.29 inHg

Overall effects
- Fatalities: 0 (+1 non-tornadic)
- Injuries: 1 (+2 non-tornadic)
- Damage: >$97.4 million (2014 USD)
- Areas affected: Central United States, Rocky Mountains
- Part of the Tornado outbreaks of 2014 and 2013–14 North American winter

From May 10–12, 2014, a large and widespread tornado outbreak of 44 tornadoes spanned across portions of the central and Great Plains regions of the United States. The May 11 portion is sometimes referred to as the Mother's Day tornado outbreak by locals, due to it occurring on the celebration at the time. The outbreak began on the 10th, with isolated tornadoes across Idaho, Kansas, Missouri and also Alabama. The strongest tornado of that event was an EF2 tornado that struck Orrick, Missouri, causing widespread damage in town.

The following day on the 11th, dozens of tornadoes were reported across Kansas, Nebraska, Iowa and South Dakota, with the event's epicenter taking place across southern and eastern Nebraska, where a prolific and cyclical, high-precipitation supercell produced 17 tornadoes from areas southeast of Hastings, to the Omaha metropolitan area. Two large EF3 tornadoes caused severe damage to portions of Clay, Fillmore, York and Seward Counties. The first one impacted rural farmsteads until eventually passing by Sutton. The parent supercell brought in powerful rear flank downdraft winds that were estimated at 100 mph (160 km/h) into the downtown area. The second EF3 was a massive and rainwrapped wedge tornado, which spanned 1.5 mi (2.4 km) wide and struck farms near Cordova, before eventually making a direct hit on the small city of Beaver Crossing. Severe rear flank downdraft and inflow winds occurred alongside as well as the supercell tracked through southeastern Nebraska. Winds of 70 mph (110 km/h) were reported near the Omaha metro area, notably Douglas County.

On the 12th, minor tornadic activity was reported. Only two tornadoes, both rated EF0 occurred outside of Elyria and Medina, Ohio, before the outbreak came to an end.

Alongside tornadic events, major and historic flash floods caused by an organized convective complex struck northern Ohio on May 12. A winter storm brought heavy snow cover for parts of the Rocky Mountains and High Plains. 43 in (110 cm) of snow was reported at the Sierra Madre Range, Wyoming. One person was killed along US 285 near Denver, Colorado, by the storm.

Only one person was injured by one of the tornadoes from this outbreak. Other injuries were inflicted by the winter storm that persisted through May 10–12, where one death also occurred.

== Meteorological synopsis ==
SPC outlooks on May 11, 2014

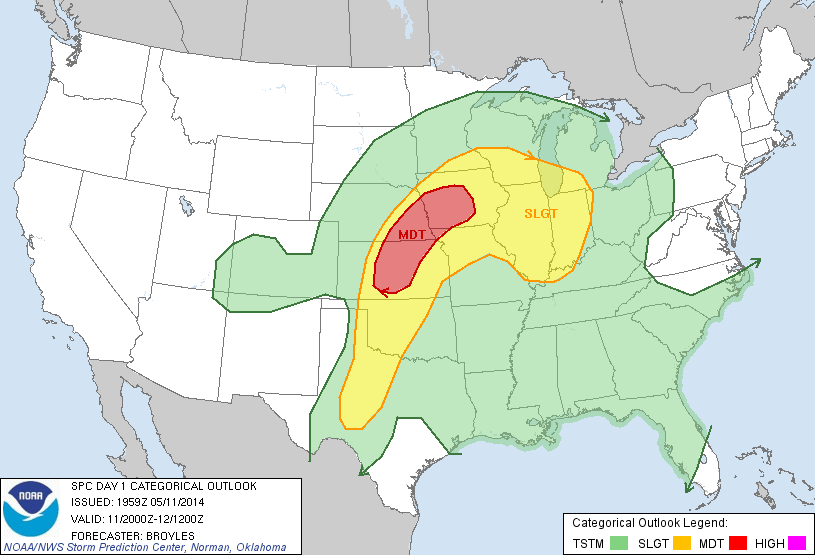
Day 1 20z categorical outlooks

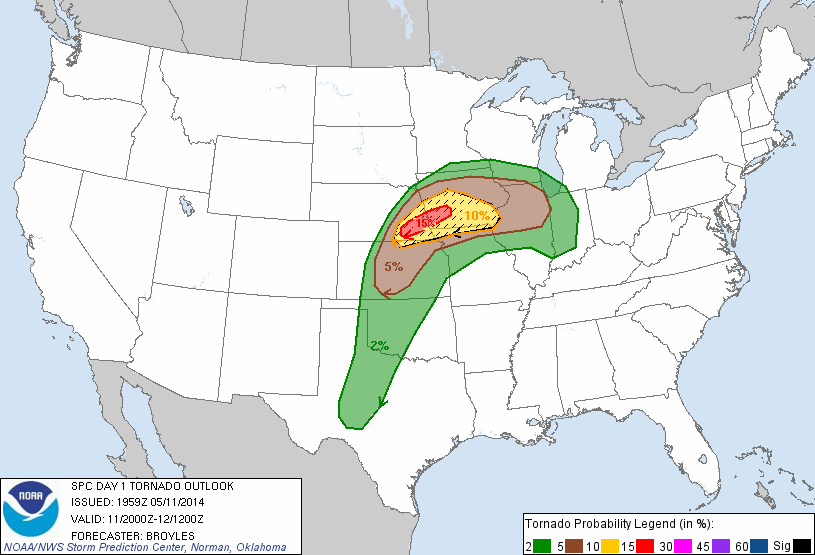
Day 1 20z tornado outlooks

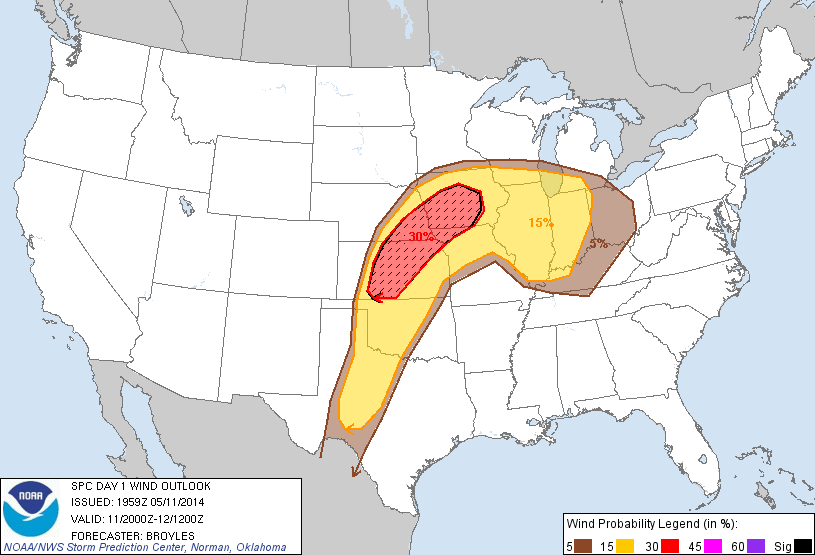
Day 1 20z wind outlooks

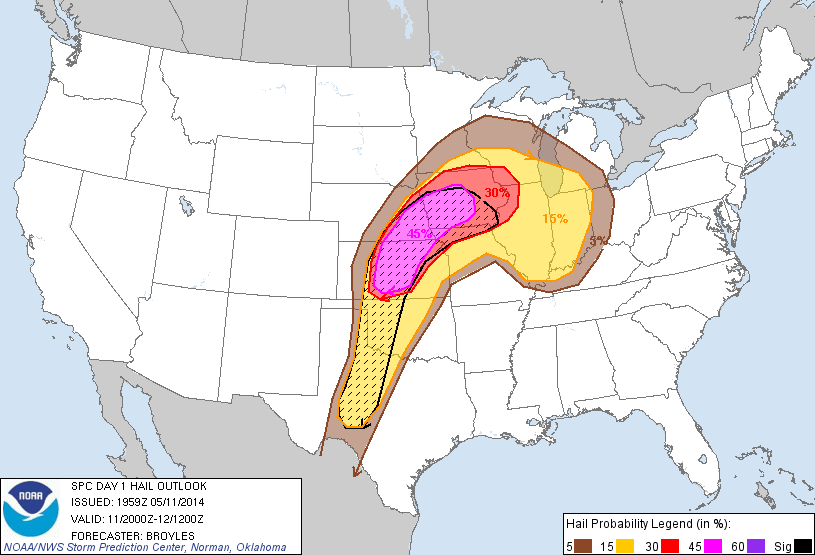
Day 1 20z hail outlooks

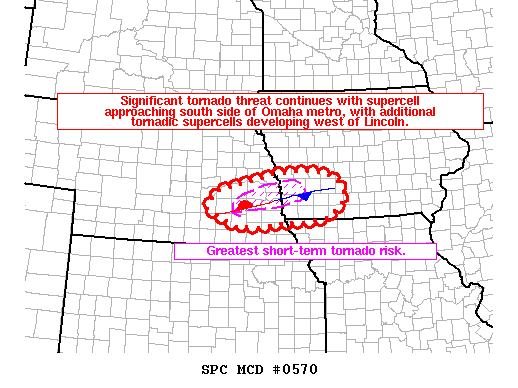
Mesoscale discussion regarding significant supercell and tornado threats in southeastern Nebraska to southwestern Iowa on May 11

On May 9, 2014, at 11:30 p.m. CDT (04:30 UTC), the Storm Prediction Center outlined a slight risk for severe weather across portions of Missouri, Illinois, Indiana, Kentucky, Tennessee, and Arkansas. A 2% probability for tornadoes within 25 mi (40 km) of a point within the region was also outlined, as a cold front moved eastward through the Great Lakes region and the Ozarks into an environment with moderate atmospheric instability and strong wind shear.

=== May 10 ===
By May 10, 1:00 a.m. CDT (06:00 UTC), the slight risk shifted westward, including much of the central Great Plains region, with a 5% probability for a tornado within 25 mi (40 km) of a point within portions of northwest Missouri and northeast Kansas, where increasing temperatures and maximized low-level shear along a warm front enhanced the threat for tornadoes. As the day progressed further, several supercell thunderstorms formed along a front over areas in central Missouri, producing several tornadoes and bringing strong wind and hail to the region. Additionally, an isolated tornado was reported in the northeastern parts of Idaho.

=== May 11 ===
On May 11, 1:00 a.m. CDT (06:00 UTC), a moderate risk was outlined for portions of northeast Kansas, southeast Nebraska, northwest Missouri, and much of southwest and central Iowa, in light of the ample moisture and high temperatures ahead of a warm front within the region. A 10% probability for a tornado within 25 mi (40 km) of a point was highlighted for much of the same area. Alongside this, a slight risk was outlined, stretching from central Texas to the Great Lakes region, alongside a 2% and 5% hatched area for tornadoes overlapping much of same areas. At 3:00 a.m. CDT (08:00 UTC), a line of strong thunderstorms rapidly formed near the Kansas/Nebraska border and shifted northward, bringing strong wind and hail to the area. As the day progressed, the moderate risk area was expanded to include more of the central Great Plains region, with a 15% hatched area for tornadoes being outlined for portions of southwest Iowa and southeast Nebraska, as strong, low-level wind shear, considerable moisture, and moderate instability favored supercellular development across the region. In the afternoon hours, thunderstorms began to rapidly develop near Hastings, Nebraska, with one severe storm that was moving eastward along a warm front producing numerous tornadoes across the region, including two that were rated EF3. Strong wind gusts, heavy rain, and large hail were also reported. Additional supercells moved across the Central Plains region, stretching from central Kansas to central Iowa. Very large hail was reported, alongside numerous tornadoes and damaging winds.

=== May 12 ===
On May 12, 1:00 a.m. CDT (06:00 UTC), a slight risk was outlined for a large portion of the southwestern and midwestern regions of the United States, stretching from southern Texas to the Great Lakes region, as moderate atmospheric instability redevelops and a cold front that was over portions of Iowa, eastern Kansas, and central Oklahoma. A 2% probability for a tornado within 25 mi (40 km) of a point was outlined for much of the same areas, alongside a 5% hatched risk area for central-to-northeast Missouri, eastern Iowa, northwestern Illinois, and southwest Wisconsin. Clusters of strong thunderstorms began to develop that afternoon, affecting areas from southern Michigan to the southern Great Plains. Strong wind and hail were reported across the region, alongside several tornado reports. That evening, a warm front over Lake Erie tracked over Ohio, with several embedded supercells forming over north-central portions of the state. The slow-moving storms produced two confirmed tornadoes and extreme levels of rainfall, resulting in numerous flash floods.

== Confirmed tornadoes ==
Confirmed tornadoes by Enhanced Fujita rating
EFU	EF0	EF1	EF2	EF3	EF4	EF5	Total
0	24	12	6	2	0	0	44

=== May 10 event ===
List of confirmed tornadoes – Saturday, May 10, 2014 (Note: All dates are based on the local time zone where the tornado touched down; however, all times are in Coordinated Universal Time for consistency.)
EF#	Location	County / Parish	State	Start Coord.	Time (UTC)	Path length	Max width	Damage (Note: All damage totals are in 2014 USD unless otherwise stated.)	Summary	Refs
EF0	NW of Monteview	Jefferson	ID	43.9914°N 112.6153°W	1747–1753	0.02 mi (0.032 km)	15 yd (14 m)	$0	A brief tornado touched down over open fields.	
EF1	E of Black	Geneva	AL	31.0012°N 85.6421°W	2007–2016	2.15 mi (3.46 km)	100 yd (91 m)	$85,000	A house sustained considerable damage and metal barn was destroyed. Support beams at the barn were blown over, which resulted in concrete footings being pulled out of the ground at that location.	
EF2	N of Sibley to Orrick to SW of Henrietta	Jackson, Ray	MO	39.2125°N 94.1701°W	2215–2255	12.63 mi (20.33 km)	500 yd (460 m)	Unknown	See section on this tornado	
EF0	N of Lexington	Ray	MO	39.2118°N 93.8694°W	2300–2302	0.64 mi (1.03 km)	25 yd (23 m)	$0	Brief tornado caused no damage.	
EF1	NNE of Marshall	Saline	MO	39.1665°N 93.172°W	0026–0043	7.27 mi (11.70 km)	1,350 yd (1,230 m)	$10,000	Large wedge tornado damaged trees, power lines, and farm structures.	
EF0	NW of Severy	Greenwood	KS	37.6598°N 96.2804°W	0116–0117	0.08 mi (0.13 km)	75 yd (69 m)	$0	Rope tornado touched down in an open field, causing no damage.	

=== May 11 event ===
List of confirmed tornadoes – Sunday, May 11, 2014
EF#	Location	County / Parish	State	Start Coord.	Time (UTC)	Path length	Max width	Damage	Summary	Refs
EF0	WNW of Deweese	Clay	NE	40.3824°N 98.2745°W	2026–2027	0.07 mi (0.11 km)	150 yd (140 m)	$0	Tornado briefly touched down in a field, causing no damage.	
EF3	NNW of Fairfield to S of Saronville to NE of Sutton	Clay, Fillmore	NE	40.4926°N 98.1207°W	2050–2128	20.21 mi (32.52 km)	1,300 yd (1,200 m)	$14,000,000	See section on this tornado	
EF0	NW of Charleston	Lee	IA	40.6059°N 91.5592°W	2124	0.1 mi (0.16 km)	30 yd (27 m)	$0	Brief tornado snapped tree limbs.	
EF2	NW of Grafton to N of Fairmont	Fillmore	NE	40.6638°N 97.7309°W	2125–2141	9.38 mi (15.10 km)	750 yd (690 m)	$3,500,000	A home was shifted 30 ft (9.1 m) off its foundation, and another lost part of its roof. Grain bins were destroyed and irrigation pivots were overturned. Widespread tree and power pole damage occurred.	
EF0	S of Grafton	Fillmore	NE	40.6185°N 97.6994°W	2125–2126	0.04 mi (0.064 km)	100 yd (91 m)	$0	Brief anticyclonic tornado remained over open fields with no damage.	
EF1	NW of Fairmont to NW of Exeter	Fillmore	NE	40.6424°N 97.5922°W	2140–2148	6.2 mi (10.0 km)	150 yd (140 m)	$150,000	Anticyclonic tornado pushed an outbuilding and a grain bin off of their foundations, and the roof of another outbuilding was partially blown off. Numerous irrigation pivots were overturned, a home sustained minor roof damage, and extensive tree damage occurred.	
EF3	N of Exeter to Beaver Crossing to S of Goehner	Fillmore, York, Seward	NE	40.6922°N 97.4531°W	2157–2228	19.14 mi (30.80 km)	2,640 yd (2,410 m)	$11,400,000	See section on this tornado	
EF0	E of McCool Junction	York	NE	40.7501°N 97.3875°W	2204–2206	0.61 mi (0.98 km)	25 yd (23 m)	$0	Satellite tornado moved southwest and merged with the main Beaver Crossing EF3 tornado, causing no damage.	
EF0	NW of Beaver Crossing	Seward	NE	40.79°N 97.29°W	2213–2219	1.71 mi (2.75 km)	100 yd (91 m)	$0	Another satellite of the Beaver Crossing EF3 tornado caused minor tree damage.	
EF2	E of Beaver Crossing	Seward	NE	40.77°N 97.2°W	2223–2238	7.96 mi (12.81 km)	500 yd (460 m)	Unknown	Tornado rapidly developed after the initial Beaver Crossing EF3 tornado dissipated. Large outbuildings were completely destroyed, trees were snapped, power lines were downed, and a semi-truck was flipped.	
EF2	S of Garland	Seward	NE	40.872°N 97.0351°W	2253–2305	4.67 mi (7.52 km)	500 yd (460 m)	Unknown	Multiple homes were impacted, including one that had its roof torn off. Large, well-constructed outbuildings were destroyed, and extensive tree and power line damage occurred.	
EF1	E of McCool Junction to N of Beaver Crossing	York, Seward	NE	40.7407°N 97.3808°W	2258–2310	5.55 mi (8.93 km)	700 yd (640 m)	$60,000	Irrigation pivots were overturned, grain bins were destroyed, and power poles were snapped. Outbuildings were destroyed and tree damage occurred as well.	
EF1	NW of Malcolm	Lancaster	NE	40.9211°N 96.9135°W	2307–2313	3 mi (4.8 km)	400 yd (370 m)	Unknown	Tornado completely destroyed several outbuildings and damaged the roof of a house at a farmstead. Trees were snapped and a hay bale was thrown nearly one half-mile.	
EF2	N of Raymond	Lancaster	NE	40.97°N 96.7955°W	2311–2320	2.5 mi (4.0 km)	300 yd (270 m)	Unknown	A house near the beginning of the path sustained structural damage, and a well-built garage was destroyed with a nearby camper being rolled over 100 yards. Several farmsteads were hit, including one where the roof was partially removed from the farmhouse, farm machinery was tossed, and every outbuilding on the property was destroyed. Trees were uprooted as well.	
EF1	S of Frizell	Pawnee	KS	38.1383°N 99.2157°W	2312–2318	2.5 mi (4.0 km)	300 yd (270 m)	Unknown	Multiple-vortex tornado remained over rural areas, causing tree damage and overturning irrigation sprinkler pivots.	
EF1	WNW of Raymond	Lancaster	NE	40.959°N 96.7986°W	2320–2330	5.27 mi (8.48 km)	280 yd (260 m)	Unknown	The roof was torn off of an outbuilding and tree damage occurred.	
EF0	E of Ceresco	Saunders	NE	41.0609°N 96.6082°W	2342–2345	1.8 mi (2.9 km)	200 yd (180 m)	Unknown	Tornado remained over open country and caused no damage.	
EF0	E of Ardell	Edwards	KS	37.8772°N 99.4722°W	2344–2345	0.75 mi (1.21 km)	25 yd (23 m)	$0	Brief, weak tornado.	
EF1	SE of Daykin to NE of Swanton	Jefferson, Saline	NE	40.2988°N 97.2741°W	2355–0015	15.5 mi (24.9 km)	500 yd (460 m)	Unknown	A church, a home, and a farmstead sustained minor damage near the beginning of the path. Extensive tree damage occurred as the tornado struck Swanton, and minor structural damage occurred in town as well. A modular home sustained roof damage before the tornado dissipated. One person was injured.	
EF1	SW of Waterloo to S of Elkhorn	Saunders, Douglas	NE	41.1632°N 96.3776°W	2359–0025	10.7 mi (17.2 km)	800 yd (730 m)	Unknown	Tornado touched down near the Two Rivers State Recreation Area. Numerous trees were toppled, some of which caused damage to homes and vehicles. Homes in the Elk Valley subdivision sustained shingle damage.	
EF1	NW of Elkhorn to S of Bennington	Douglas	NE	41.2989°N 96.254°W	0021–0027	5.16 mi (8.30 km)	200 yd (180 m)	Unknown	Tornado moved through several subdivisions. Numerous trees and power poles were downed, and homes sustained roof and garage door damage. One home lost a large section of its roof. A farm shed was damaged before the tornado dissipated.	
EF0	N of Spink	Union	SD	42.8713°N 96.7332°W	0032–0038	2.5 mi (4.0 km)	50 yd (46 m)	$20,000	A two-story garage lost part of one of its second story walls, a hog barn was damaged, and the top of a grain bin was ripped off. Tree damage occurred as well.	
EF1	ESE of Middleburg	Sioux	IA	43.0973°N 96.0144°W	0135–0146	4 mi (6.4 km)	100 yd (91 m)	$3,000,000	Three farmsteads were damaged, with a house sustaining damage at one of them. Structures and vehicles sustained considerable damage at a dairy farm.	
EF0	NE of Hudson	Stafford	KS	38.1762°N 98.5622°W	0144–0148	3.43 mi (5.52 km)	50 yd (46 m)	$0	Tornado moved through open fields, causing no damage.	
EF0	NNE of Newkirk	Sioux	IA	43.1031°N 95.9293°W	0150–0152	0.86 mi (1.38 km)	50 yd (46 m)	$0	Tornado remained over open country and caused no damage.	
EF0	E of Sheldon	O'Brien	IA	43.178°N 95.814°W	0159–0201	0.86 mi (1.38 km)	50 yd (46 m)	$5,000	Tree damage occurred and a vehicle was damaged by flying debris.	
EF0	ESE of Springvale	Pratt	KS	37.5155°N 98.9246°W	0203–0206	4.6 mi (7.4 km)	50 yd (46 m)	$0	Weak tornado caused no damage.	
EF0	SW of Sterling	Rice	KS	38.191°N 98.2257°W	0212–0213	0.42 mi (0.68 km)	50 yd (46 m)	$0	Brief tornado caused no damage	
EF0	NW of Sterling	Rice	KS	38.2345°N 98.2205°W	0220–0222	1.02 mi (1.64 km)	50 yd (46 m)	$0	Tornado caused power flashes but no noticeable damage.	
EF2	SSW of Guthrie Center to ESE of Fanslers	Guthrie	IA	41.6108°N 94.5128°W	0243–0248	10.34 mi (16.64 km)	240 yd (220 m)	$1,300,000	A large condominium building was severely damaged, losing its roof and many of its second floor walls. Numerous trees were snapped and barns were damaged as well.	
EF0	NNW of Inman	McPherson	KS	38.2951°N 97.789°W	0251–0253	1.25 mi (2.01 km)	75 yd (69 m)	$0	Tornado caused power flashes but no noticeable damage.	
EF0	WSW of Inman	McPherson	KS	38.2239°N 97.8003°W	0254–0256	0.68 mi (1.09 km)	50 yd (46 m)	$0	Brief tornado caused no damage.	
EF1	E of Fanslers	Guthrie	IA	41.7239°N 94.4243°W	0256–0303	4.33 mi (6.97 km)	190 yd (170 m)	$400,000	Trees were uprooted, including one that crushed a car.	
EF0	E of McPherson	McPherson	KS	38.363°N 97.6304°W	0305–0308	1.13 mi (1.82 km)	75 yd (69 m)	$0	Brief tornado caused no damage.	
EF0	N of Dallas Center	Dallas	IA	41.7351°N 93.9776°W	0321–0327	5.91 mi (9.51 km)	100 yd (91 m)	$100,000	Farm buildings were damaged.	
EF0	SW of Napier	Boone	IA	41.9471°N 93.7634°W	0344–0346	1.68 mi (2.70 km)	100 yd (91 m)	$25,000	A short-lived tornado caused minor damage to a farmstead.	

=== May 12 event ===
List of confirmed tornadoes – Monday, May 12, 2014
EF#	Location	County / Parish	State	Start Coord.	Time (UTC)	Path length	Max width	Damage	Summary	Refs
EF0	SW of Shawville	Lorain	OH	41.3474°N 82.0332°W	2345–2350	1.02 mi (1.64 km)	100 yd (91 m)	$75,000	Tornado remained mainly over farmland. Several trees were downed and a few buildings sustained minor roof damage. Downgraded from EF1 to EF0 post-survey.	
EF0	WNW of Poe	Medina	OH	41.086°N 81.864°W	0015–0017	0.21 mi (0.34 km)	40 yd (37 m)	$25,000	Homes and businesses sustained minor roof and fascia damage.	

=== Sibley–Orrick, Missouri ===
Sibley–Orrick, Missouri
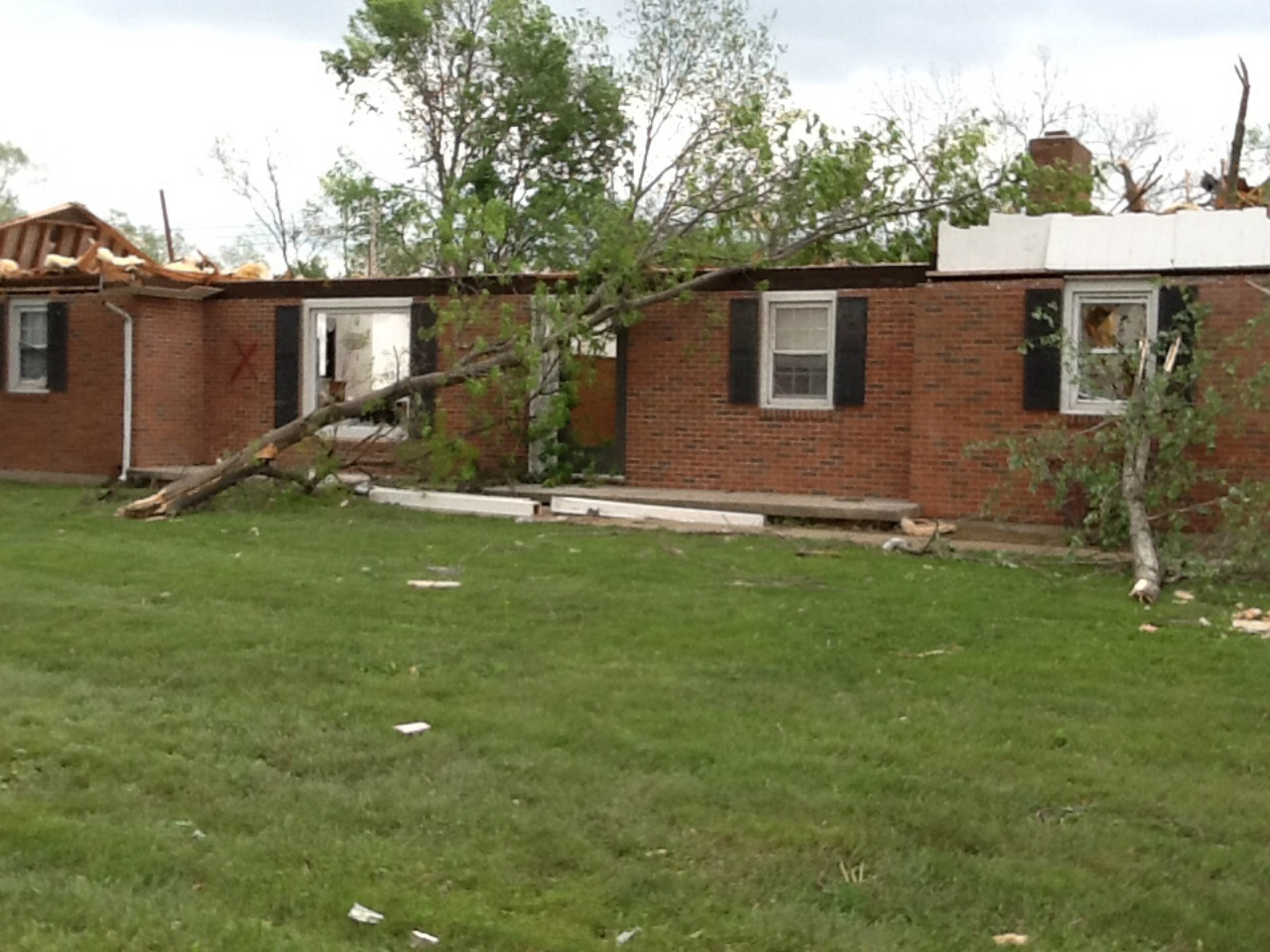
- A home in Orrick that suffered EF2 roof damage

Meteorological history
- Formed: May 10, 2014, 5:15 p.m. CDT (UTC–05:00)
- Dissipated: May 10, 2014, 5:55 p.m. CDT (UTC–05:00)
- Duration: 40 minutes

EF2 tornado
- on the Enhanced Fujita scale
- Highest winds: 122 mph (196 km/h)

Overall effects
- Fatalities: 0
- Injuries: 0

A supercell formed over the Kansas City metropolitan area, dropping this strong tornado on the northern bank of the Missouri River, near Sibley in Jackson County. It first began causing EF0 damage to trees in this area, before moving out of Jackson County, where it would intensify to EF1 strength, snapping or damaging powerlines along Egypt Road. As the tornado was 5 mi (8.0 km) west of Orrick, the National Weather Service forecasting office for the Kansas City, Missouri area issued a tornado warning for parts of Ray County at 5:30 p.m. CDT (12:30 UTC).

The tornado would begin to close in on Orrick, parallel to MO 210. Upon entering the small city, the tornado would cause EF1 damage to a stick-built pole barn on Sibley Road. One home had its garage and side walls blown out, windows shattered and roof damaged. Entering the main part of Orrick, the tornado began to intensify and cause EF2 damage to a house, which had its roof ripped off. At the same time, the tornado nearly destroyed much of the city's high school, with the roof for a majority blown off. EF1 damage was inflicted for nearly the entirety of Orrick as the tornado traversed through. Upon exiting, the tornado weakened and remained at EF0 intensity. Rear flank downdraft winds estimated at 104 mph (167 km/h) snapped trees along State Highway T within Fleming. After passing north and east of Camden, the tornado would dissipate to the southwest of Henrietta. The supercell responsible for this tornado produced an EF0 tornado north of Lexington, and an EF1 tornado northeast of Marshall.

The event was the first notable tornado of the outbreak, directly striking the city of Orrick. 80% of the structures in Orrick suffered damage by the tornado, blocking off access to the city. This tornado tracked for 12.63 mi (20.33 km), and had a width of 500 yd (0.28 mi; 0.46 km) across Jackson and Ray Counties. In light of the damage, Orrick High School was closed for the remaining school year, and the school's senior class had their graduation ceremony in Excelsior Springs.

=== Clay Center–Saronville–Sutton, Nebraska ===
Clay Center–Saronville–Sutton, Nebraska
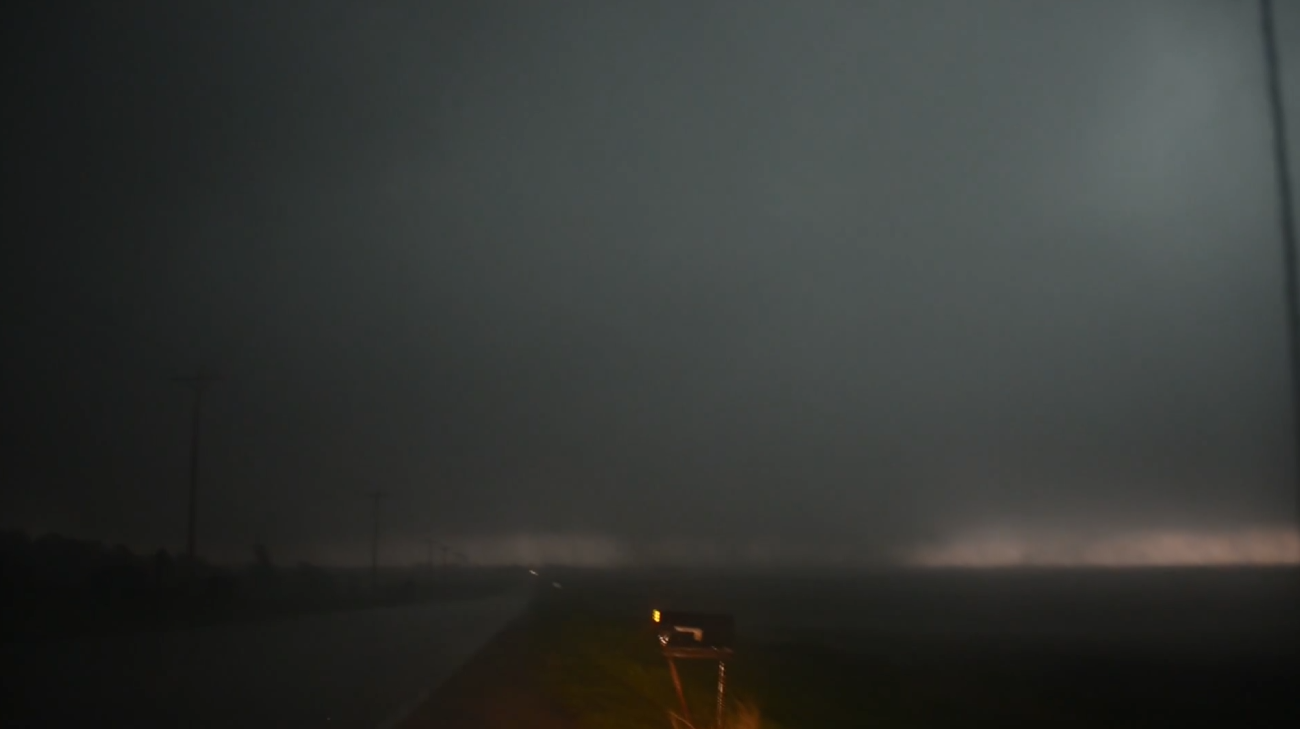
- The tornado as it was east of Clay Center

Meteorological history
- Formed: May 11, 2014, 3:50 p.m. CDT (UTC–05:00)
- Dissipated: May 11, 2014, 4:28 p.m. CDT (UTC–05:00)
- Duration: 38 minutes

EF3 tornado
- on the Enhanced Fujita scale
- Highest winds: 150 mph (240 km/h)

Overall effects
- Fatalities: 0
- Injuries: 0
- Damage: $14 million (2014 USD)

The first major tornado on Mother's Day touched down north-northwest of Fairfield, in central Clay County. This large, multiple-vortex tornado descended from a low-based supercell, which brought darkness early on into the afternoon hours as it passed south of Clay Center at EF0 intensity. The tornado then began to strengthen to EF1 intensity east of the town, accompanying 85 mph (137 km/h) rear flank downdraft winds swept across portions of Clay County, damaging or destroying several trees and powerlines. Farming equipment, especially irrigation pivots were flipped and or severely totaled by both the tornado and accompanying rear flank downdraft.

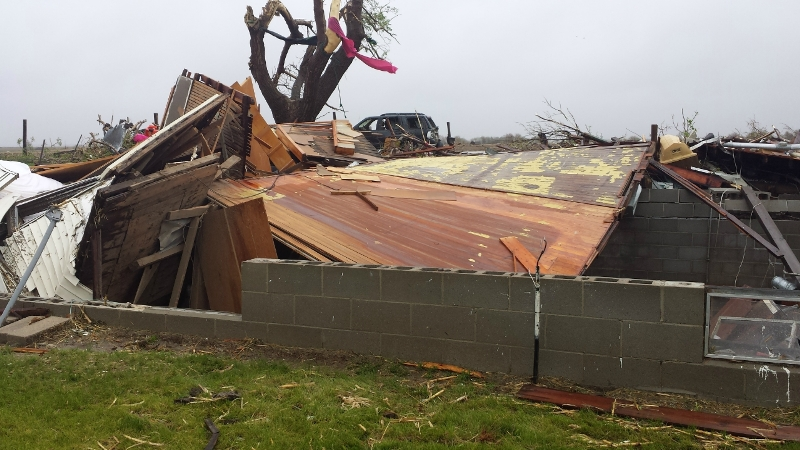
A farmhouse north of Sutton was destroyed at mid-range EF3 intensity

After tracking for 3.5 mi (5.6 km), the tornado enlargened in width, and briefly intensified further to the south of Saronville, causing EF2 damage to several trees, which had their trunks snapped. EF1 damage persisted as many barns were heavily destroyed, and rural homes suffered minor damage. West of Sutton, the tornado caused considerable EF2 damage to a pole barn. The tornado would then begin to curve around the small city from the west, with predominantly EF1 damage inflicted on homesteads. North of Sutton, along Road X, the tornado became intense as it impacted farmstead at EF3 intensity. A poorly-built residence was completely leveled, with debris filling up the basement. EF2 damage was inflicted to several utility poles, and one outbuilding that had limited anchoring was partially swept off its foundation. For the remainder of its time, the tornado caused EF1 damage to multiple homes along the Clay–Fillmore County border, before it weakened and dissipated north of US 6 in Fillmore County.

This was the first significant tornado produced by the prolific supercell that tracked across southeastern Nebraska. Many homes and farms were impacted by this large and often obscured tornado, which tracked for 20.21 mi (32.52 km) across the two counties, and was 1,300 yd (0.74 mi; 1.2 km) at its widest. A total of $14 million (2014 USD) was caused by this tornado, making it the most costly event of the entire outbreak. Rear flank downdraft winds of around 100 mph (160 km/h) impacted the downtown area of Sutton, causing major and widespread damage throughout the city.

=== Cordova–Beaver Crossing, Nebraska ===
Cordova–Beaver Crossing, Nebraska
- Shot of the large tornado behind a farmstead near Cordova

Meteorological history
- Formed: May 11, 2014, 4:57 p.m. CDT (UTC–05:00)
- Dissipated: May 11, 2014, 5:28 p.m. CDT (UTC–05:00)
- Duration: 31 minutes

EF3 tornado
- on the Enhanced Fujita scale
- Highest winds: 140 mph (230 km/h) (Per NOAA DAT, winds of 152 mph (245 km/h) were estimated)

Overall effects
- Fatalities: 0
- Injuries: 0
- Damage: $11.4 million (2014 USD)

This severe tornado began just south on the Fillmore–York County border, north of Exeter. The tornado began at EF1 intensity, as it flipped an irrigation pivot onto fleeing storm chasers. After entering York County, the tornado widened and intensified to EF2 strength as it began to snap utility poles and destroy barns west of Cordova. At the same time, the parent supercell's rear flank downdraft produced many instances of estimated straight-line winds above 100 mph (160 km/h), including 118 mph (190 km/h) in 7 places, snapping powerpoles and destroying outbuildings across eastern Fillmore and York Counties, as well as creating one instance of estimated 122 mph (196 km/h) winds, which peeled the roof off of a house.

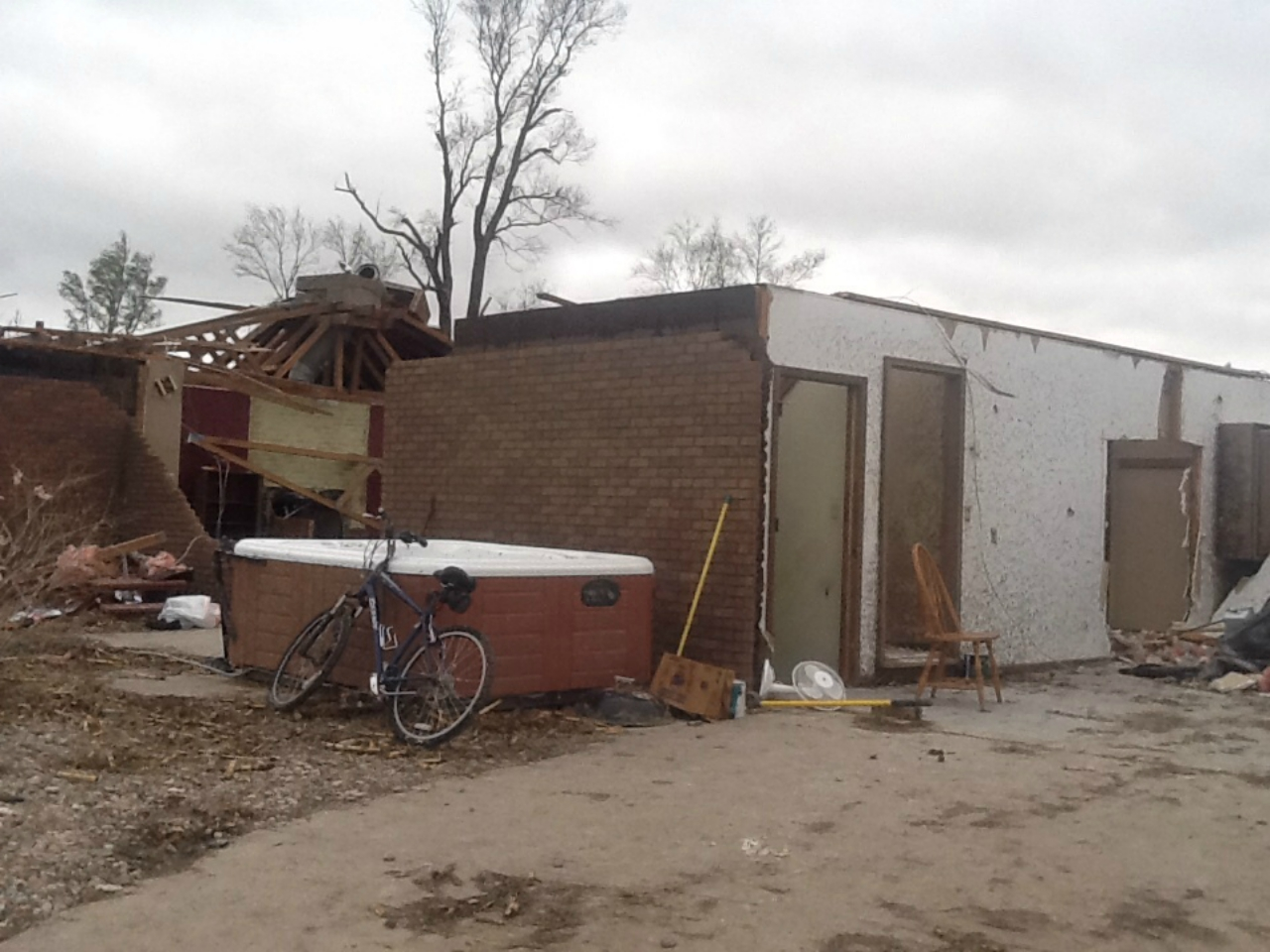
EF3 damage to a farmhouse near Cordova

As the tornado crossed over into Seward County, it began to pass north of Cordova and intensify to EF3 strength, impacting two homesteads on County Road 462. One farmhouse only had its inner walls standing, and a nearby barn was completely destroyed at one of these properties as well. The tornado continued causing EF3 damage as another farmhouse on Denton Road suffered major damage to its exterior walls, with only the interior room standing. Two satellite tornadoes also formed one after another north of the EF3 tornado.

Aerial view of damage in Beaver Crossing

The ongoing rear flank downdraft, with near mid-range EF2-equivalent winds continued to impact many rural areas to the south of Beaver Crossing, with the tornado also becoming heavily rainwrapped and approaching the village. Making a direct hit, the tornado engulfed the entirety of Beaver Crossing, causing widespread EF2 damage to numerous homes and businesses with most having lost their roofs or covering at the worst. After leaving Beaver Crossing, the tornado continued causing EF2 damage to rural structures, notably one home southeast of town was considerably destroyed. After tracking for a few miles, the tornado ended south of Goehner. A large EF2 tornado already formed 5 minutes prior, and became the dominant circulation as the EF3 tornado was dissipating.

This massive and rainwrapped wedge tornado, which spanned 2,640 yd (1.50 mi; 2.41 km) wide was the sixth, and largest tornado the prolific supercell that traveled across southeastern Nebraska produced, and of the entire outbreak. It tracked for 19.14 mi (30.80 km) across Fillmore, York and Seward Counties for over half an hour. Monetary losses totaled up to $11.4 million (2014 USD), making it the second most costly tornado of the outbreak. Volunteers came in to help residents of Beaver Crossing, with former Nebraska governor Dave Heineman visiting the area the next day on May 12.

== Non-tornadic effects ==
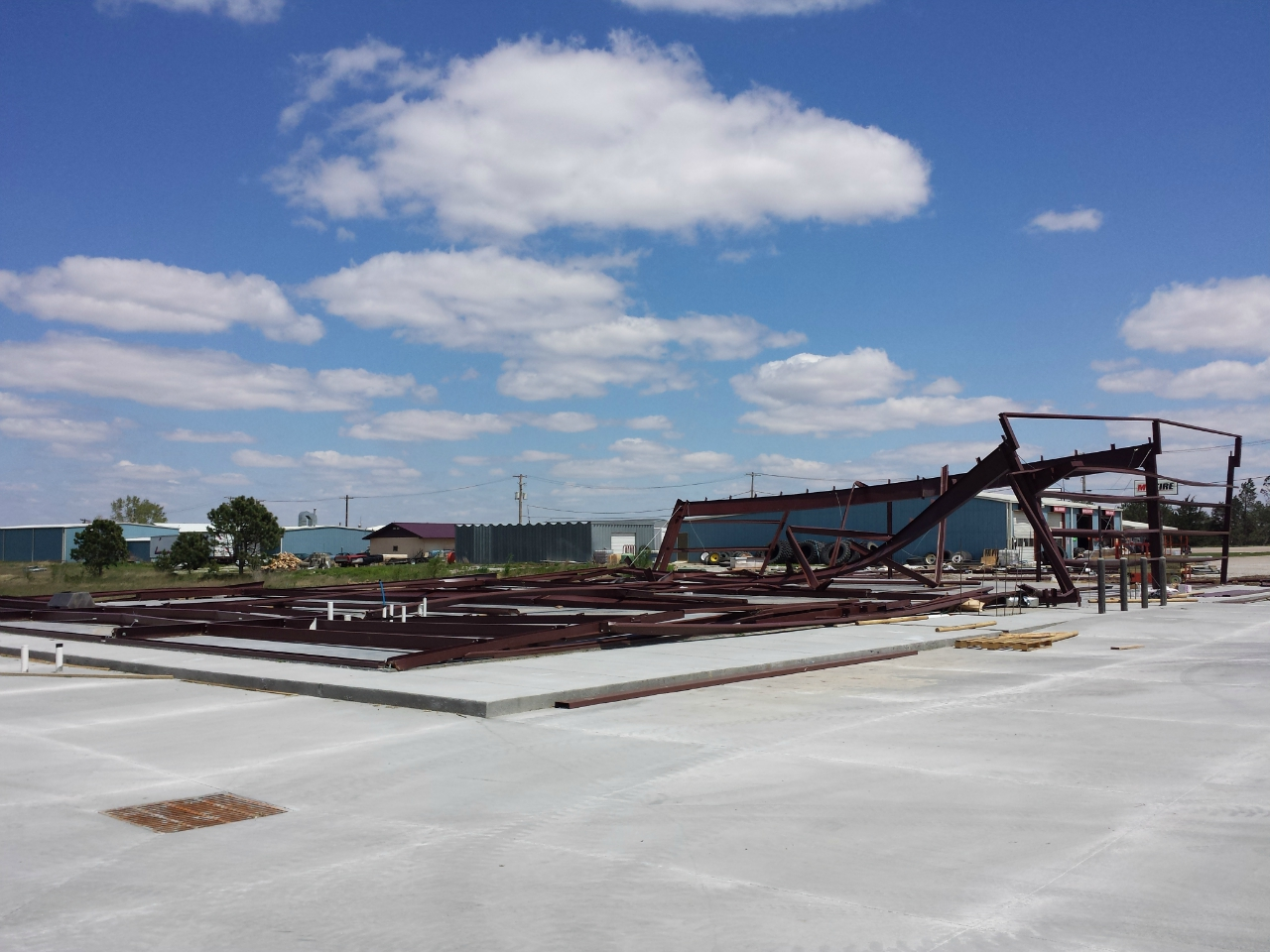
High winds completely collapsed this metal storage building in Sutton, Nebraska

=== Wind event ===
During the May 11 event, a long-lived supercell that produced over a dozen tornadoes across southeastern Nebraska, produced a large swath of powerful rear flank downdraft (RFD) winds across portions of the counties of Clay, Fillmore, York, Seward, Lancaster and Saunders. These severe winds sometimes exceeded 100 mph (160 km/h), with the highest gust at 122 mph (196 km/h) during the ongoing Beaver Crossing tornado. Nine separate locations of straight-line winds of 118 mph (190 km/h) occurred. Two were in north central Fillmore County, and seven were in southwest Seward county, all being instances of snapped power poles. Southwest Seward County also had the single highest estimated wind gust during the event happen there, when a roof was torn off a home, with the windspeed needed to do so being judged as having been 122 mph (196 km/h). Downburst winds peaking at 110 mph (180 km/h) completely damaged the downtown area of Sutton, with multiple homes, businesses and outbuildings suffering from major roof loss, to total collapse of the structures themselves. Wind gusts up to 87 mph (140 km/h) were reported in the western Omaha metropolitan area as this supercell neared by.

=== Flash flooding ===
On May 12, destructive flash floods took places in the northern parts of Ohio, particularly Lorain County, which was among the hardest hit area. The floods were caused by an organized convective complex, with embedded supercells that formed over Lake Erie from a warm front. These storms were very slow-moving, which caused them to pour inches of rainfall across numerous communities. County-level emergencies were declared for the counties of Lorain, Medina and Summit. In Cuyahoga County, rescue operations were conducted, however, no casualties were reported. Lorain County saw up to 6.5 in (17 cm) of rainfall occur in 3.5 hours, with an estimated 300 homes and 1000 businesses destroyed. In Summit County, 4–4.5 in (10–11 cm) fell over Cuyahoga Falls. Around 3–4 ft (0.91–1.22 m) of floodwater was reported in basements of homes, by the Medina County Emergency Management Agency. The intensity of the rainfall was a historic, half-millennium event for some of the most damaged areas.

=== Winter storm ===
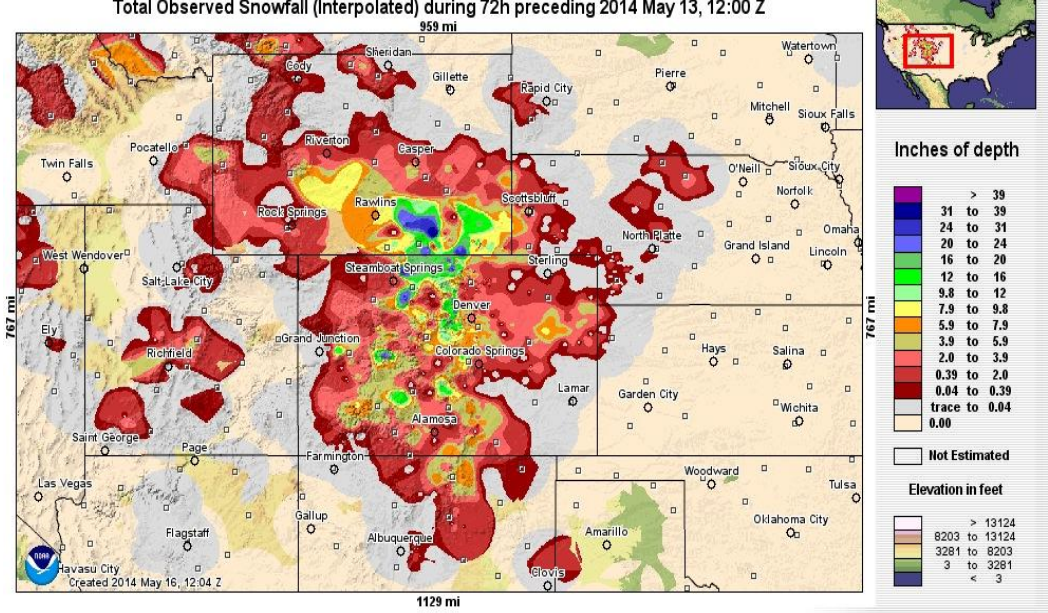
NOAA NOHRSC map of the Rocky Mountains with measured snowfall

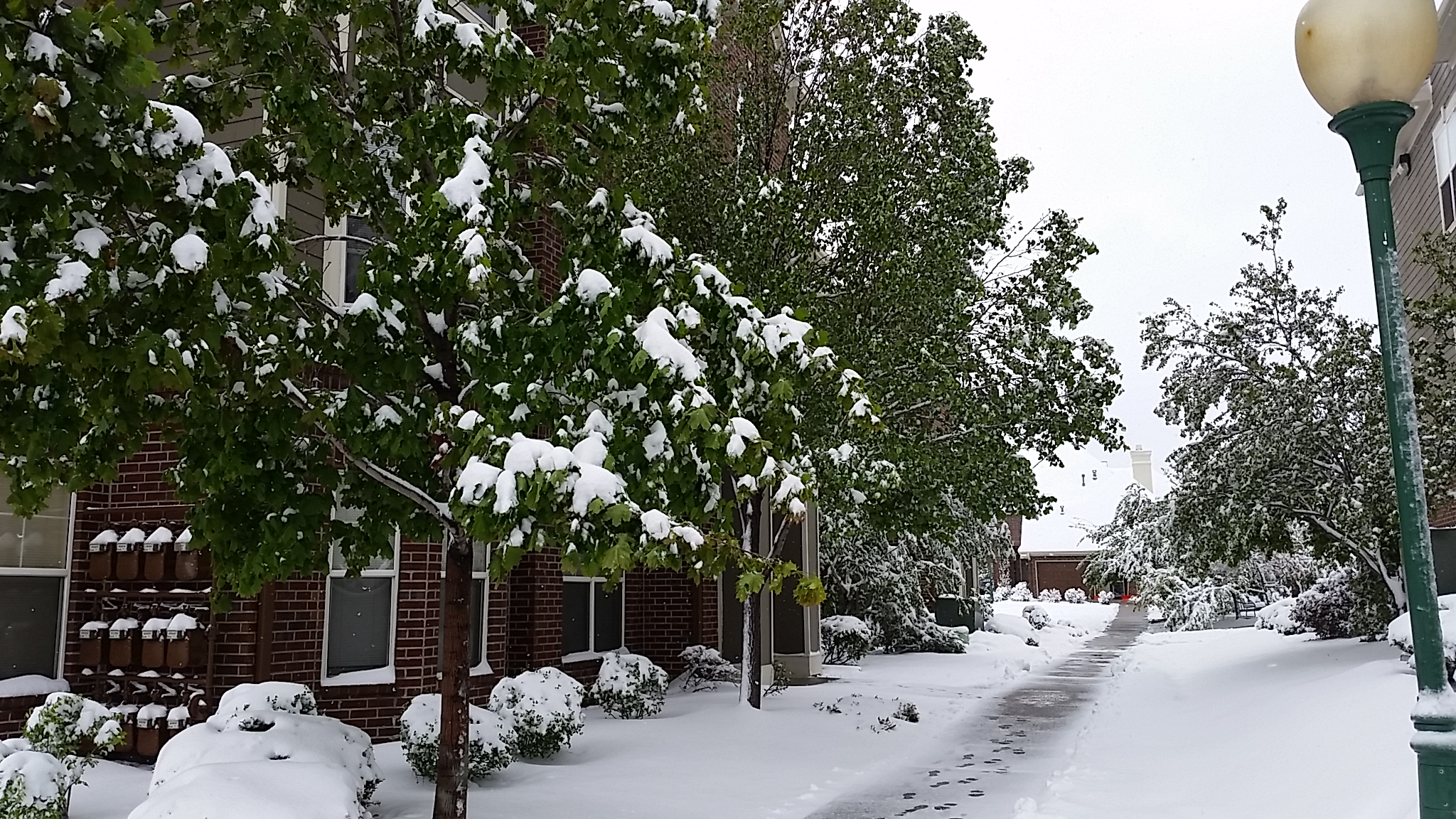
The winter storm bringing in snow to Colorado

From May 10 to 14, a rare late-season winter storm occurred over the central Rocky Mountains and High Plains. Areas in western Nebraska, Wyoming, Colorado and Utah were impacted by the snow storm. Over 1 ft (0.30 m) of snowfall across multiple locations. The highest measured was at Divide Peak, at the Sierra Madre mountain range in southern Wyoming, which saw 43 in (1.1 m) of snow. Other places with heavy measurements were near Pinecliffe, Colorado, a measurement of 30.1 in (0.76 m) of snow occurred. In Leadville, Colorado and Arlington, Wyoming; 22 in (0.56 m) of snow was recorded. Heavy wet snow damaged trees in Cedar City, Utah. According to Xcel Energy, up to 17.000 customers lost power during the morning hours of May 12. Denver International Airport was among the many that suffered from the power outages, but the impact was kept at minimum due to a backup generator. Travel and transportation across the Rockies were severely hampered and became dangerous throughout the duration of the storm. Flights at airports in the impacted regions saw delays or cancellations. One death occurred by winter storm on US 285, near Denver, Colorado. In Wyoming, I-80 was issued to be closed off. This prompt caused thousands of motorists to be stranded, and rest stops along the interstate were overcrowded.

== See also ==
- Weather of 2014
- Tornadoes of 2014
  - List of United States tornadoes from April to May 2014
- List of North American tornadoes and tornado outbreaks
- Tornado outbreak of June 16–18, 2014 – A more infamous and destructive tornado outbreak that occurred over a month later.
