= Clinton Howard =

Clinton Howard may refer to:

- Clinton Woodbury Howard (1864–1937), United States district judge
- Clinton N. Howard (1868–1955), American lecturer and reformer
- Clint Howard (born 1959), American actor

== See also ==
- Clint Howard (1930–2011), American old-time musicians of Clint Howard and Fred Price
