= Beaver Crossing, Nebraska =

Villages in Seward County, Nebraska, United States

- Village
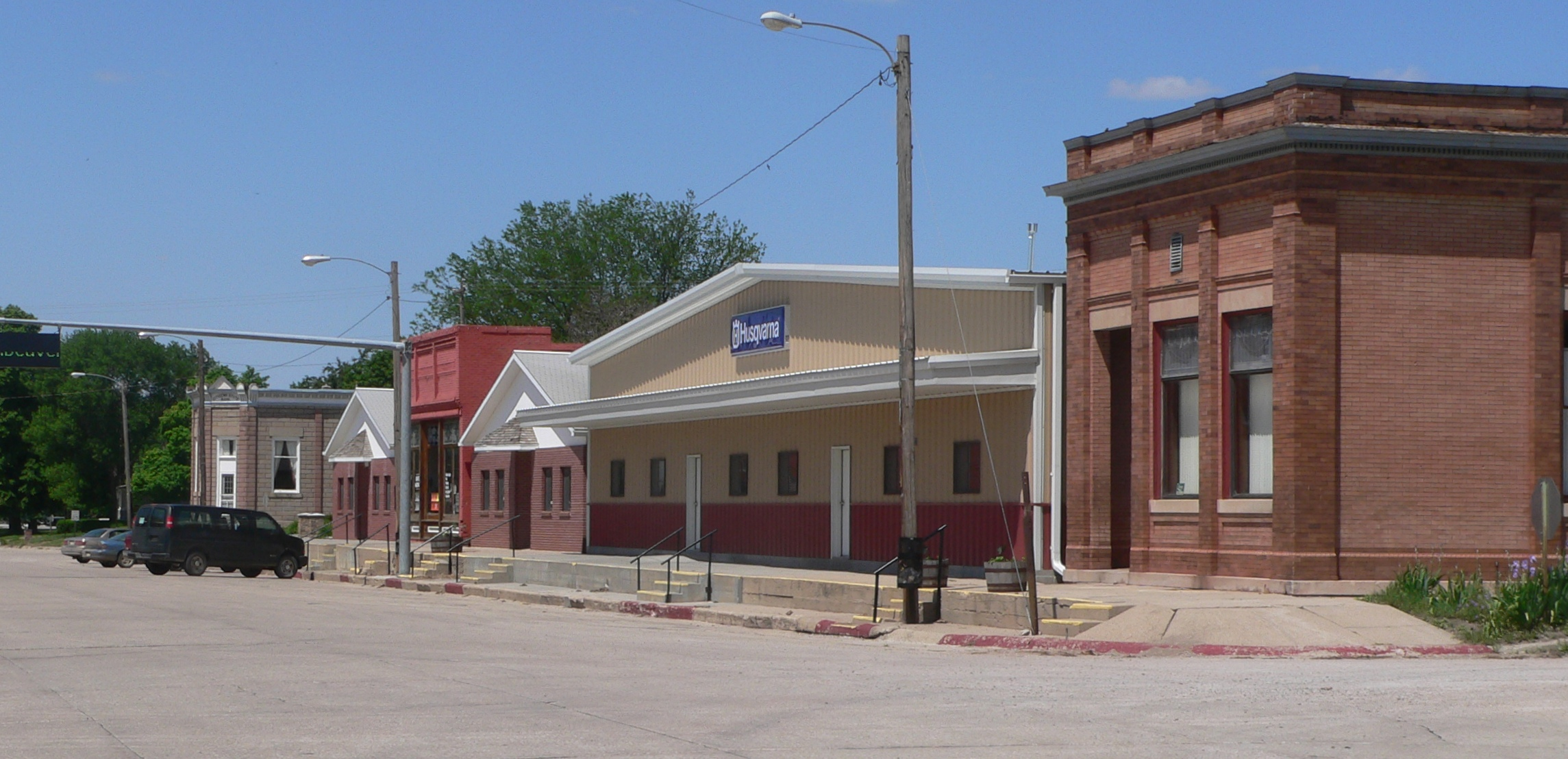
- Downtown Beaver Crossing, May 2012

- Location of Beaver Crossing, Nebraska
- Coordinates: 40°46′42″N 97°16′57″W
- Country: United States
- State: Nebraska
- County: Seward

Area
  - Total: 0.66 sq mi (1.71 km^{2})
  - Land: 0.66 sq mi (1.70 km^{2})
  - Water: 0.0077 sq mi (0.02 km^{2})
- Elevation: 1,460 ft (450 m)

Population (2020)
  - Total: 375
  - Density: 572.3/sq mi (220.95/km^{2})
- Time zone: UTC0 (Central (CST))
  - Summer (DST): UTC0 (CDT)
- ZIP code: 68313
- Area code: 402
- FIPS code: 31-03530
- GNIS feature ID: 2398060
- Website: beavercrossingvillage.com

Beaver Crossing is a village in Seward County, Nebraska, United States. The population was 375 at the 2020 census.

== History ==
Beaver Crossing was platted in 1875 in anticipation of the building of the railroad which, to the town's dismay, would not arrive until 1887. It was named from a nearby crossing of a trail from Nebraska City to Fort Kearny over Beaver Creek.

On May 11, 2014, a powerful EF3 tornado struck Beaver Crossing, damaging virtually every structure. The tornado also caused damage in nearby Cordova. Despite the significant damage, there were no fatalities.

== Geography ==
According to the United States Census Bureau, the village has a total area of 0.67 square miles (1.74 km^{2}), of which 0.66 square miles (1.71 km^{2}) is land and 0.01 square miles (0.03 km^{2}) is water.

== Demographics ==
Historical population
Census	Pop.	Note	%±
1880	49		—
1900	359		—
1910	542		51.0%
1920	543		0.2%
1930	522		−3.9%
1940	550		5.4%
1950	425		−22.7%
1960	439		3.3%
1970	400		−8.9%
1980	458		14.5%
1990	448		−2.2%
2000	457		2.0%
2010	403		−11.8%
2020	375		−6.9%
U.S. Decennial Census

=== 2010 census ===
As of the census of 2010, there were 403 people, 171 households, and 121 families residing in the village. The population density was 610.6 inhabitants per square mile (235.8/km^{2}). There were 187 housing units at an average density of 283.3 per square mile (109.4/km^{2}). The racial makeup of the village was 97.8% White, 0.2% African American, 0.2% Native American, 0.5% Asian, and 1.2% from two or more races. Hispanic or Latino of any race were 1.0% of the population.

There were 171 households, of which 28.1% had children under the age of 18 living with them, 57.3% were married couples living together, 5.8% had a female householder with no husband present, 7.6% had a male householder with no wife present, and 29.2% were non-families. 26.9% of all households were made up of individuals, and 7.1% had someone living alone who was 65 years of age or older. The average household size was 2.36 and the average family size was 2.82.

The median age in the village was 47.1 years. 22.8% of residents were under the age of 18; 5.5% were between the ages of 18 and 24; 18% were from 25 to 44; 37.3% were from 45 to 64; and 16.4% were 65 years of age or older. The gender makeup of the village was 53.3% male and 46.7% female.

=== 2000 census ===
As of the census of 2000, there were 457 people, 184 households, and 126 families residing in the village. The population density was 690.7 inhabitants per square mile (266.7/km^{2}). There were 203 housing units at an average density of 306.8 per square mile (118.5/km^{2}). The racial makeup of the village was 95.19% White, 1.53% African American, 1.97% Native American, 0.22% Asian, and 1.09% from two or more races. Hispanic or Latino of any race were 0.66% of the population.

There were 184 households, out of which 31.5% had children under the age of 18 living with them, 57.6% were married couples living together, 7.1% had a female householder with no husband present, and 31.0% were non-families. 25.0% of all households were made up of individuals, and 12.0% had someone living alone who was 65 years of age or older. The average household size was 2.48 and the average family size was 2.99.

In the village, the population was spread out, with 25.6% under the age of 18, 7.4% from 18 to 24, 26.3% from 25 to 44, 26.9% from 45 to 64, and 13.8% who were 65 years of age or older. The median age was 41 years. For every 100 females, there were 85.8 males. For every 100 females age 18 and over, there were 91.0 males.

As of 2000 the median income for a household in the village was $30,455, and the median income for a family was $39,464. Males had a median income of $31,250 versus $18,906 for females. The per capita income for the village was $14,967. About 3.4% of families and 6.1% of the population were below the poverty line, including 4.8% of those under age 18 and 14.3% of those age 65 or over.

== Notable people ==
- Benjamin Hunkins, pioneer and Wisconsin territorial and state legislator, lived in Beaver Crossing.
- Jan Opperman, race car driver, lived in Beaver Crossing in the mid-1960s.

== See also ==
- List of municipalities in Nebraska
