= Eugene W. Chafin =

American politician (1852–1920)

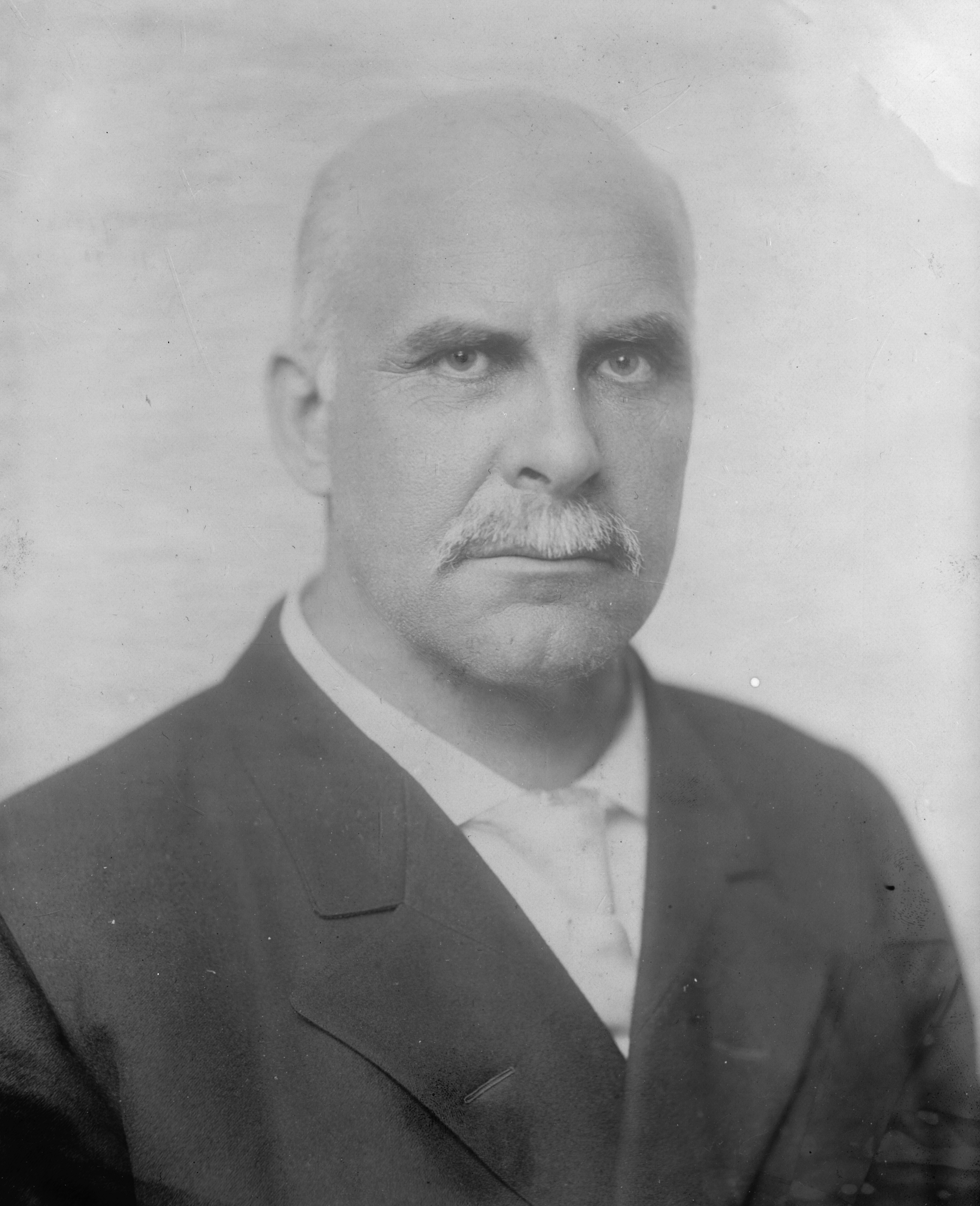

Personal details
- Born: Eugene Wilder Chafin; November 1, 1852 Mukwonago/East Troy, Wisconsin, U.S.
- Died: November 30, 1920 (aged 68) Long Beach, California, U.S.
- Party: Prohibition (1881–1920)
- Other political affiliations: Republican (before 1881)
- Spouse: Carrie Arvilla Hunkins
- Children: 2
- Parents: Samuel Evans Chafin (father); Betsy Almira Pollard (mother)
- Relatives: Robert Hastings Hunkins (father-in-law); Benjamin Hunkins (brother-in-law); Amos Pollard (uncle)
- Education: University of Wisconsin–Madison (LL.B.)
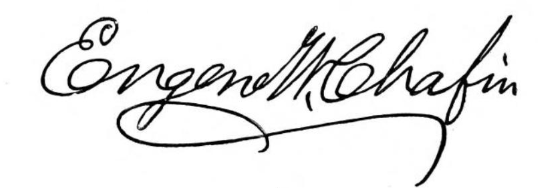
- Signature

Eugene Wilder Chafin (November 1, 1852 – November 30, 1920) was an American politician and writer who served as the Prohibition Party's presidential candidate during the 1908 and 1912 presidential elections. He was active in local politics in Wisconsin, statewide elections in Wisconsin, Illinois, and Arizona, and campaigned throughout the United States and the world in favor of the prohibition of alcohol.

After serving as a delegate to multiple Prohibition national conventions he rose to serving on the national committee and then received the presidential nomination twice, but declined to seek the nomination again for the 1916 presidential election.

== Early life ==
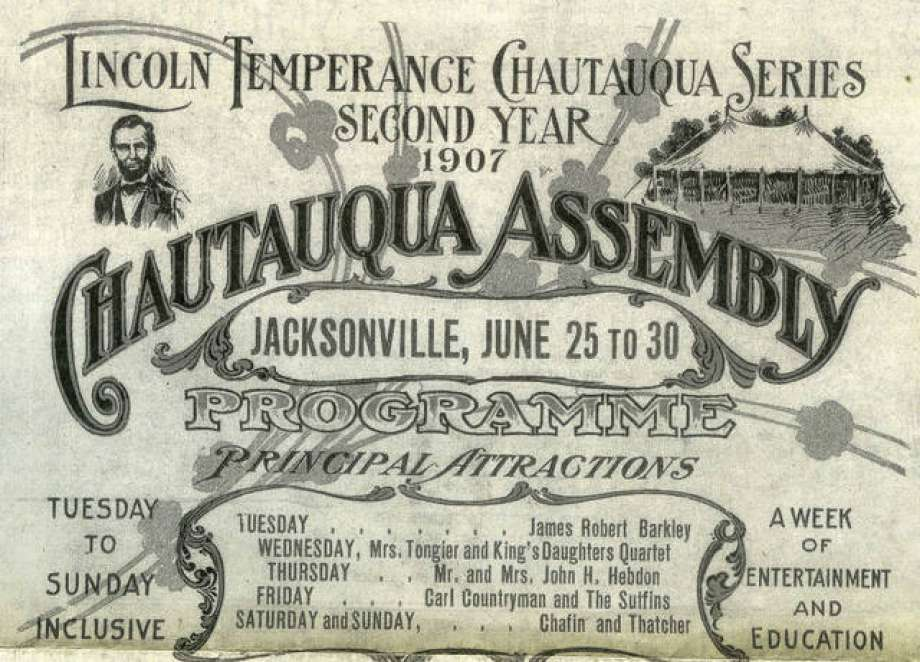
The program for a Chautauqua movement lecture that featured Chafin

Eugene Wilder Chafin was born on November 1, 1852, to Samuel Evans Chafin and Betsy Almira Pollard, on his family's farm in between East Troy and Mukwonago, Wisconsin. Chafin attended the University of Wisconsin–Madison and graduated on June 17, 1875, with a law degree and during his education shared a room with future Governor, Senator, and presidential candidate Robert M. La Follette. From 1875 to 1901 he practiced law in Waukesha, Wisconsin. On November 24, 1881, he married Carrie Arvila Hunkins and later had two children with her, one that died after birth on February 22, 1884, and Desdemona Eleanor on March 17, 1893.

On October 1, 1901, he moved to Chicago to become the superintendent of the city's Washingtonian home, which housed 1,500 alcoholics, and served in that position until 1904. From 1904 to 1908 he served as a lecturer as part of the Chautauqua movement. In 1909, he was admitted to practice law before the Supreme Court of the United States after being presented by Senator La Follette and with Carrie Nation in attendance.

== Career ==
=== Local politics ===
In 1881, he left the Republican Party and joined the Prohibition Party and in the same year ran for District Attorney in Waukesha county. From 1884 to 1920, he served as a delegate to the Prohibition national conventions, from 1888 to 1896 he served as a national committeeman from Wisconsin and again for Arizona and California from 1912 to 1920, at the 1884 convention he served as the Sergeant-at-Arms and gave one of the seconding speechings for John St. John, and in 1900 he served on the platform committee.

In 1877, he was elected as the Justice of the Peace in Waukesha and served until 1883 and then served as Police Justice until 1885. He later served on the school and public library board. Chafin ran for the House of Representatives in Wisconsin in 1882 and in Illinois in 1902. In 1886 and 1900, he ran for attorney general in Wisconsin and later ran for attorney general in Illinois in 1904. In 1898, he ran for Governor of Wisconsin.

=== Presidential ===
==== 1908 ====
On July 16, 1908, Chafin was nominated by A. G. Wolfenbarger and Chafin won the Prohibition presidential nomination on the third ballot with 636 delegates voting for him against William B. Palmore, Daniel R. Sheen, Alfred L. Manierre, Will W. Tracy, Frederick F. Wheeler, James B. Cranfill, and Oliver W. Stewart. The vice presidential nomination was offered to Palmore due to him receiving the second highest amount of support, but he declined and the position was instead given to Aaron S. Watkins. While running for president he was also simultaneously running for the Prohibition gubernatorial nomination in Illinois, but was defeated in the primary by Daniel R. Sheen.

In August, he was swimming at the YMCA in Lincoln, Nebraska, where he almost drowned, but was rescued by three people. On August 14, 1908, he was giving a speech in Springfield, Illinois, when a lynch mob started a race riot in an attempt to kill three black prisoners and while he was taking his handkerchief out from his pocket a member of the mob believed that he was pulling a gun out and threw a brick at him. In the general election he received 254,087 votes for 1.71% of the total popular vote.

==== 1912 ====
Chafin started his second presidential campaign on January 5, 1912, in Tucson, Arizona, and then traveled east towards Atlantic City, New Jersey, where on July 12, 1912, he won the Prohibition presidential nomination on the first ballot with 594 delegates after having his name presented by F. J. Sibley and Watkins was selected as his vice president again after two ballots. After winning the nomination he traveled towards the western United States and campaigned in all of the states along the Pacific Coast before the general election. During the campaign he traveled a total of 36,300 miles through thirty states and received 208,156 votes for 1.38% of the popular vote in the general election.

==== 1916 ====
In December 1915, he stated that he would not seek the Prohibition presidential nomination again for the 1916 presidential election and that he believed that Representative Richmond P. Hobson would receive the nomination. He also gave his support to Henry Ford's Peace Ship and that he would put forward a vote to add abolishing the War and Navy Departments and establishing a Department of Peace at the 1916 National Prohibition Convention.

Chafin attempted to draft Henry Ford for the Prohibition presidential nomination, but he made no attempt. At the national convention he put forward former New York Governor William Sulzer for the presidential nomination, but he was defeated by former Indiana Governor Frank Hanly with 440 delegates to 188 delegates on July 21, 1916. An attempt was made to make Hanly's nomination unanimous, but it failed after Chafin objected. He also objected and stopped efforts to rename the party to either the Progressive, American, or National party and criticized Virgil G. Hinshaw for writing to John M. Parker in an attempt to fuse the Prohibition and Progressive parties. In the general election, Hanly and Ira Landrith received 221,302 votes for 1.19% of the popular vote.

== Later life ==
In 1908, Chafin was appointed to the bar of the Supreme Court of the United States and in October 1909, he and his family moved to Tucson in the Arizona Territory. Following Arizona's admission into the United States as a state he ran in the House special election and received 0.41% in fourth place.

In January 1913, he started a campaign in Milwaukee, Wisconsin, to fundraise $1,000,000 for the Prohibition party to use during the 1916 elections and later participated in a fundraising event in November across Ohio to raise $10,000 for the party.

On January 29, 1914, he announced that he would run in Arizona's Senate election and received 15.05% in the general election and from 1914 to 1915 gave lectures as part of the Flying Squadron of America. Chafin also campaigned in favor of a California ballot proposition to prohibit alcohol in 1914 and during it stated that women who voted against it deserved to be beaten by their husbands.

On January 6, 1919, Chafin and his family boarded the S.S. Sonoma to travel to Australia to help the Australian prohibition movement. The Eighteenth Amendment banning alcohol was ratified while he was traveling on January 16, 1919, and he was interviewed after disembarking in Australia.

On November 20, 1920, Chafin was lighting his gas heater at his home in Long Beach, California, in the Los Angeles area, and his clothing caught fire. He suffered burns and was initially saved by Henry Murray who wrapped him in quilts, but he died from his injuries on November 30. In 1921, his cremated remains were buried in Prairie Home Cemetery in Waukesha, Wisconsin, and the National Prohibition Committee had a memorial hour for Chafin at its November 1921 session.

== Electoral history ==
Eugene W. Chafin electoral history

1882 Wisconsin Second Congressional District election
Party	Candidate	Votes	%	±%
Democratic	Daniel H. Sumner	10,671	50.40%	+3.78%
Republican	John Samuel Rowell	8,870	41.89%	−10.08%
Prohibition	Eugene W. Chafin	1,006	4.75%	+4.75%
Greenback	Lorenzo Merrill	627	2.96%	+1.55%
Total votes		21,174	100.00%	

1898 Wisconsin gubernatorial election
Party	Candidate	Votes	%
Republican	Edward Scofield (incumbent)	173,137	52.56%
Democratic	Hiram Wilson Sawyer	135,353	41.09%
Populist	Albinus A. Worsley	8,518	2.59%
Prohibition	Eugene W. Chafin	8,078	2.45%
Social Democratic	Howard Tuttle	2,544	0.77%
Socialist Labor	Henry Riese	1,473	0.45%
Write-in		327	0.10%
Total votes		329,430	100.00%

1902 Illinois Sixth Congressional District election
Party	Candidate	Votes	%	±%
Republican	William Lorimer	16,540	49.67%	+0.20%
Democratic	Allan C. Durborow Jr.	15,555	46.72%	+1.59%
Socialist	H. P. Kuesch	667	2.00%	+2.00%
Prohibition	Eugene W. Chafin	536	1.61%	+1.06%
Total votes		33,298	100.00%	

1908 Prohibition presidential first ballot
Party	Candidate	Votes	%
Prohibition	William B. Palmore	273	26.63%
Prohibition	Eugene W. Chafin	195	19.02%
Prohibition	Alfred L. Manierre	159	15.51%
Prohibition	Daniel R. Sheen	124	12.10%
Prohibition	Will W. Tracy	105	10.24%
Prohibition	Frederick F. Wheeler	72	7.02%
Prohibition	Oliver W. Stewart	61	5.95%
Prohibition	James B. Cranfill	28	2.73%
Prohibition	George R. Stewart	7	0.68%
Prohibition	Charles Scanlon	1	0.10%
Total votes		1,025	100.00%

1908 Prohibition presidential second ballot
Party	Candidate	Votes	%	±%
Prohibition	William B. Palmore	418	32.84%	+6.21%
Prohibition	Eugene W. Chafin	376	29.54%	+10.52%
Prohibition	Daniel R. Sheen	157	12.33%	+0.23%
Prohibition	Alfred L. Manierre	121	9.51%	−6.00%
Prohibition	Will W. Tracy	81	6.36%	−3.88%
Prohibition	Frederick F. Wheeler	73	5.73%	−1.29%
Prohibition	Oliver W. Stewart	47	3.69%	−2.26%
Total votes		1,273	100.00%	

1908 Prohibition presidential third ballot
Party	Candidate	Votes	%	±%
Prohibition	Eugene W. Chafin	636	59.22%	+29.68%
Prohibition	William B. Palmore	415	38.64%	+5.80%
Prohibition	Daniel R. Sheen	12	1.12%	−11.21%
Prohibition	Will W. Tracy	7	0.65%	−5.71%
Prohibition	Alfred L. Manierre	4	0.37%	−9.14%
Total votes		1,074	100.00%	

1908 Prohibition presidential fourth ballot
Party	Candidate	Votes	%	±%
Prohibition	Eugene W. Chafin	1,087	100.00%	+40.78%
Total votes		1,087	100.00%	

1908 Illinois gubernatorial Prohibition primary
Party	Candidate	Votes	%
Prohibition	Daniel R. Sheen	3,604	53.58%
Prohibition	Eugene W. Chafin	3,123	46.43%
Total votes		6,727	100.00%

1908 United States Presidential election
Party	Candidate	Votes	%	±%
Republican	William Howard Taft	7,678,174	43.04%	−4.85%
Democratic	William Jennings Bryan	6,409,007	43.04%	+5.45%
Socialist	Eugene V. Debs	420,856	2.83%	−0.15%
Prohibition	Eugene W. Chafin	254,081	1.71%	−0.21%
Independence	Thomas L. Hisgen	82,580	0.55%	+0.55%
Populist	Thomas E. Watson	28,862	0.19%	−0.65%
Socialist Labor	August Gillhaus	14,031	0.09%	−0.16%
Republican	Davidson Faction	987	0.01%	+0.01%
United Christian	Daniel Turney	463	0.00%	+0.00%
Write-in		69	0.00%	-0.00%
Total votes		15,048,834	100.00%	

1912 United States Presidential election
Party	Candidate	Votes	%	±%
Democratic	Woodrow Wilson	6,296,284	41.84%	−1.20%
Progressive	Theodore Roosevelt	4,122,721	27.40%	+27.40%
Republican	William Howard Taft (incumbent)	3,486,242	23.17%	−28.40%
Socialist	Eugene V. Debs	901,551	5.99%	+3.16%
Prohibition	Eugene W. Chafin	208,156	1.38%	−0.33%
Socialist Labor	Arthur E. Reimer	29,324	0.19%	+0.10%
Write-in		4,556	0.03%	+0.03%
Total votes		15,048,834	100.00%	

1914 Arizona Senate election
Party	Candidate	Votes	%	±%
Democratic	Marcus A. Smith (incumbent)	25,800	53.23%	+2.88%
Republican	Don Lorenzo Hubbell	9,183	18.95%	−24.90%
Independent	Eugene W. Chafin	7,293	15.05%	+15.05%
Socialist	Bert Davis	3,582	7.39%	+7.39%
Progressive	J. Bernard Nelson	2,608	5.38%	+5.38%
Total votes		16,617	100.00%	

== Bibliography ==
- Voters' Handbook, (1876)
- Lives of the Presidents, (1896)
- Lincoln, the Man of Sorrow, (1908)
- Washington as a Statesman, (1909)
- The Master Method of the Great Reform, (1913)

Party political offices
Preceded by Silas C. Swallow	Prohibition nominee for President of the United States; 1908, 1912	Succeeded by Frank Hanly
