= Hunkin =

Hunkin is a surname. Notable people with the surname include:

- Chris Hunkin (born 1980), English cricketer
- John S. Hunkin (1945–2025), Canadian banker
- Joseph Hunkin (Governor of Scilly) (1610–1661), Governor of Scilly during the English Civil War
- Joseph Hunkin (Bishop of Truro) (1887–1950), eighth Anglican Bishop of Truro
- Lauren Hunkin (born 1979), Canadian show jumper
- Tim Hunkin (born 1950), English engineer, cartoonist, writer, and artist

== See also ==
- The surname Hunkins
