= Skirmish at Albany, Missouri =

Battle of the American Civil War

Coordinates: 39.21°N 94.12°W

- Part of American Civil War
Date	October 26, 1864
Location	Albany (modern day Orrick, Missouri), Ray County, Missouri
Result	Union Victory

Belligerents
United States (Union)	(Confederate States of America) CSA (Confederacy)

Commanders and leaders
Samuel P. Cox	William T. Anderson †

Units involved
Union troops	Quantrill's Guerrillas

Strength
300 Union troops	150 mounted Confederate guerrillas

Casualties and losses
4 wounded	27

The Skirmish at Albany, Missouri was a battle that was fought between the Union Army and the Quantrill's Raiders in Ray County, Missouri on October 26, 1864. The battle resulted a Union victory, and the notorious Quantrill Raider member William T. Anderson, also known as "Bloody Bill", was killed at this battle.

14 year old Confederate guerilla Clell Miller was taken prisoner.

== See also ==
- William T. Anderson
- Samuel P. Cox
