= Orrick, Missouri =

- Town
- Location of Orrick, Missouri
- Coordinates: 39°12′48″N 94°07′25″W
- Country: United States
- State: Missouri
- County: Ray

Area
  - Total: 1.34 sq mi (3.46 km^{2})
  - Land: 1.34 sq mi (3.46 km^{2})
  - Water: 0 sq mi (0.00 km^{2})
- Elevation: 722 ft (220 m)

Population (2020)
  - Total: 753
  - Density: 564.2/sq mi (217.83/km^{2})
- Time zone: UTC-6 (Central (CST))
  - Summer (DST): UTC-5 (CDT)
- ZIP code: 64077
- Area code: 816
- FIPS code: 29-54938
- GNIS feature ID: 2396085

Orrick is a town in Ray County, Missouri, and part of the Kansas City metropolitan area within the United States. The population was 753 at the 2020 census.

== History ==
The first community in the area was Albany, established by Ely Carter in 1854. When he applied for a post office, the request was denied because another Albany already existed in the state. Carter then used the name of his wife, Ada, for the post office, but the town continued to be known as Albany.

"Bloody Bill" Anderson was killed during the American Civil War in the Battle of Albany on October 24, 1864.

Albany was formally incorporated in 1871; however, by that time the St. Louis, Kansas City and Northern Star Railroad (later the Wabash Railroad) had laid tracks a mile south in 1868 and 1869, leading to the establishment of a new community, Orrick, along the railroad.

Orrick was laid out by the railroad and named in honor of W. W. Orrick, who drew up the plat. The town was incorporated in 1873.

=== Tornadoes ===
On January 24, 1967, an unusual winter tornado outbreak destroyed the town's high school, killing two students.

On May 10, 2014, a severe weather outbreak produced a notable tornado just southwest of Orrick. The tornado strengthened as it approached the town, reaching EF2 intensity while passing through Orrick.

== Geography ==
According to the United States Census Bureau, the city has a total area of 1.34 square miles (3.47 km^{2}), all of it land.

== Demographics ==
Historical population
Census	Pop.	Note	%±
1880	193		—
1890	370		91.7%
1900	391		5.7%
1910	435		11.3%
1920	632		45.3%
1930	689		9.0%
1940	666		−3.3%
1950	675		1.4%
1960	800		18.5%
1970	883		10.4%
1980	922		4.4%
1990	935		1.4%
2000	889		−4.9%
2010	837		−5.8%
2020	753		−10.0%
U.S. Decennial Census

=== 2010 census ===
As of the census of 2010, there were 837 people, 319 households, and 221 families living in the city. The population density was 624.6 inhabitants per square mile (241.2/km^{2}). There were 364 housing units at an average density of 271.6 per square mile (104.9/km^{2}). The racial makeup of the city was 97.7% White, 0.2% African American, 0.4% Native American, 0.1% Asian, 0.2% from other races, and 1.3% from two or more races. Hispanic or Latino of any race were 2.3% of the population.

There were 319 households, of which 41.7% had children under the age of 18 living with them, 52.0% were married couples living together, 13.8% had a female householder with no husband present, 3.4% had a male householder with no wife present, and 30.7% were non-families. 25.7% of all households were made up of individuals, and 10.1% had someone living alone who was 65 years of age or older. The average household size was 2.62 and the average family size was 3.20.

The median age in the city was 35.2 years. 30.8% of residents were under the age of 18; 7.5% were between the ages of 18 and 24; 27.4% were from 25 to 44; 24.4% were from 45 to 64; and 9.8% were 65 years of age or older. The gender makeup of the city was 47.7% male and 52.3% female.

=== 2000 census ===
As of the census of 2000, there were 889 people, 340 households, and 246 families living in the town. The population density was 649.9 inhabitants per square mile (250.9/km^{2}). There were 372 housing units at an average density of 271.9 per square mile (105.0/km^{2}). The racial makeup of the town was 98.43% White, 0.67% Native American, and 0.90% from two or more races. Hispanic or Latino of any race were 1.69% of the population.

There were 340 households, out of which 39.1% had children under the age of 18 living with them, 55.3% were married couples living together, 13.8% had a female householder with no husband present, and 27.4% were non-families. 23.5% of all households were made up of individuals, and 9.1% had someone living alone who was 65 years of age or older. The average household size was 2.61 and the average family size was 3.10.

In the town the population was spread out, with 29.8% under the age of 18, 8.3% from 18 to 24, 32.3% from 25 to 44, 18.4% from 45 to 64, and 11.1% who were 65 years of age or older. The median age was 33 years. For every 100 females there were 96.2 males. For every 100 females age 18 and over, there were 94.4 males.

The median income for a household in the town was $37,500, and the median income for a family was $44,205. Males had a median income of $32,250 versus $21,198 for females. The per capita income for the town was $15,215. About 10.6% of families and 10.0% of the population were below the poverty line, including 17.0% of those under age 18 and 6.7% of those age 65 or over.

== Education ==
It is in the Orrick R-XI School District.

The high school football team, the Orrick Bearcats, won Missouri state high school football championships in 1975, 2007 and 2008.
