= Aaron S. Watkins =

American politician

Aaron Watkins
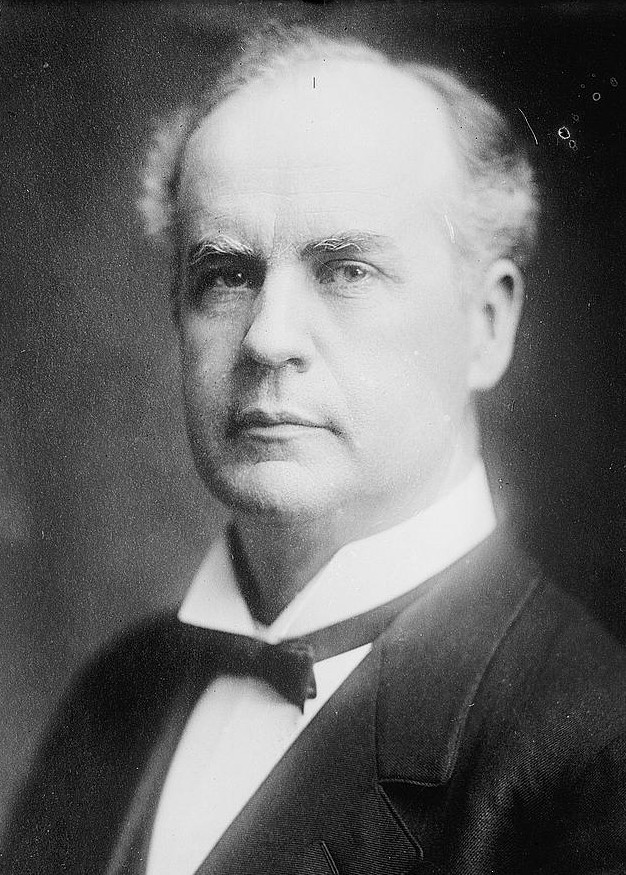

Personal details
- Born: Aaron Sherman Watkins; November 29, 1863 Rushsylvania, Ohio, U.S.
- Died: February 9, 1941 (aged 77) Rushsylvania, Ohio, U.S.
- Party: Prohibition

Aaron Sherman Watkins (November 29, 1863 – February 9, 1941), born in Ohio, was a president of Asbury College in Kentucky. Before his ordination as a Methodist minister, he practiced law with his brother. He was the grandfather of Prohibition candidate for Vice President of the United States, W. Dean Watkins.

Long dedicated to promoting the temperance movement, Watkins served as Prohibition Party candidate for various political offices. These included:

- Prohibition candidate for US Representative of Ohio 9th District, 1904
- Prohibition candidate for US Vice President, 1908 & 1912 (nominated at the 1908 and 1912 Prohibition National Conventions)
- Prohibition candidate for US President, 1920

Watkins received honorary degrees of Bachelor of Science, Master of Science, Doctor of Laws, Doctor of Divinity, Doctor of Humane Letters and Doctor of Philosophy. At the time of his 1920 presidential election, he was working as a professor of science at the Miami Military Institute in Germantown, Ohio.

== See also ==
- Prohibition Party presidential election results

Party political offices
Preceded by George W. Carroll	Prohibition nominee for Vice President of the United States; 1908, 1912	Succeeded by Ira Landrith
Preceded by Frank Hanly	Prohibition nominee for President of the United States; 1920	Succeeded by Herman P. Faris
