= Robert Hastings Hunkins =

American politician

- Born: September 15, 1774; New Hampshire Grants, British North America (now Vermont)
- Died: March 11, 1853; New Berlin, Wisconsin
- Occupations: Settler, Pioneer, Farmer, Legislator
- Known for: Historical figure
- Spouse: Hannah Emerson
- Children: 6 verified, including Benjamin Hunkins
- Parent(s): Captain Robert Hunkins and Lydia Chamberlain
- Relatives: Eugene W. Chafin (son-in-law)

Robert Hastings Hunkins (September 15, 1774 – March 11, 1853) was an American politician. He was an early settler of the Wisconsin Territory and served in the Vermont House of Representatives.

== Biography ==
Hunkins was born on September 15, 1774, in the New Hampshire Grants, territory that was disputed between the Province of New Hampshire and the Province of New York. He was the third son of Captain Robert Hunkins and his second wife, Lydia Chamberlin. (Note: Robert H. Hunkins was the second cousin twice removed of Quaker poet John Greenleaf Whittier.) The territory became the Vermont Republic in 1777, and joined the United States as the state of Vermont in 1791.

In 1806 Hunkins was both a selectman and treasurer for the town of Navy, Vermont. From 1811 to 1812 Hunkins was Town Representative to the Vermont General Assembly for the town of Charleston, Vermont. In 1811, the Vermont General Assembly was a unicameral legislature; in 1836, the Vermont Senate was added and the Vermont General Assembly became a bicameral legislature.

Three of Hunkins' sons, Sargeant, Robert and Benjamin, moved to the Wisconsin Territory. In 1839 Hunkins followed them and set up a large farm that he worked alongside his two other sons James and Hazen.

Hunkins died in New Berlin, Wisconsin in 1853. He was buried in the plot of his brother, the Hazen Hastings Hunkins plot, at Prairie Home Cemetery in Waukesha, Wisconsin.

== Family ==
On November 15, 1798 Hunkins married Hannah, the daughter of Watts Emerson and Lois Trussel. (Note: Along with being a cousin of essayist Ralph Waldo Emerson, Hannah Emerson was the great-great-granddaughter of Hannah Duston, a colonial Massachusetts Puritan taken captive by Indians.) They had five sons:

- Sargeant Roger Hunkins (born March 12, 1802), who married Rebecca Whitcher (born September 6, 1807) on September 25, 1825;
- Robert W. Hunkins;
- Benjamin Hunkins, born 1810. Benjamin was called twice to service in the territorial legislature of Wisconsin. He was a delegate to the first constitutional convention of Wisconsin and served in the State Legislature in 1860;
- James Hunkins;
- Hazen Hastings Hunkins

and some daughters, including:

- Carrie Arvilla Hunkins, who married Eugene W. Chafin.

Family of Robert Hastings Hunkins

Captain Robert Hunkins	Lydia Chamerlain
Robert Hastings Hunkins	Hannah Emerson
Eugene W. Chafin	Carrie Arvilla Hunkins	Benjamin Hunkins
Desdemona Eleanor Chafin
