= Benjamin Hunkins =

19th century American politician

Member of the Wisconsin State Assembly from the Waukesha 4th district
- In office January 2, 1860 – January 7, 1861
- Preceded by: Charles T. Deissner
- Succeeded by: Myron Gilbert

Member of the House of Representatives of the Wisconsin Territory for Milwaukee and Washington counties
- In office December 4th, 1843 – February 24th, 1845

Personal details
- Born: September 10, 1810 Charleston, Vermont, U.S.
- Died: April 27, 1900 (aged 89) Beaver Crossing, Nebraska, U.S.
- Party: Democratic; Free Soil (1848)
- Spouse: Sophronia Hollister (m. 1842; died 1887)
- Children: 8
- Parents: Robert Hastings Hunkins (father); Hannah Emerson (mother)
- Relatives: Eugene W. Chafin (brother-in-law)
- Occupation: Farmer, politician

Benjamin Hunkins (September 10, 1810 – April 27, 1900) was an American farmer, Indian agent, Democratic politician, and pioneer of Wisconsin and Nebraska. He was a member of the Wisconsin State Assembly, representing Waukesha County during the 1860 term. Before Wisconsin achieved statehood, he was a member of the Wisconsin Territory House of Representatives during the 4th Wisconsin Territorial Assembly, and served as a delegate to the first Wisconsin constitutional convention, whose constitution was rejected by voters in 1846.

== Early life ==
Hunkins, born in Charleston, Vermont in 1810, was the son of settler Robert Hastings Hunkins and Hannah Emerson. (Note: Hunks was grandson of the Revolutionary War Captain Robert Hunkins, and first cousin to poet Ralph Waldo Emerson.)

Hunkins moved to Wisconsin at the age of 28 when his father and family relocated there. He purchased land in what became Waukesha County in the town of Mentor, renamed New Berlin in 1840. The heavily timbered land was cleared by Hunkins for farming, and he cultivated the land himself. He subsequently got involved in local state politics and became one of the first representatives in the territorial legislature.

== Politician and federal Indian agent ==
On April 5, 1842, Hunkins was elected Chairman of New Berlin's board of supervisors. After serving as Chairman, Hunkins served on the board of supervisors in one-year periods in years 1849, 1852, 1853 and 1858.

Hunkins served in the Wisconsin Territorial House of Representatives in 1843 and 1844. He was also a delegate to the first state constitutional convention, held in 1846.

Hunkins was a federal Indian agent for the Green Bay Agency from 1855 to 1857. He mainly worked with the Menominee tribe, trying to align the United States Government's goals with theirs. Hunkins believed he had made headway in "civilizing the tribe", and called for them to abstain from alcohol. One of his compatriots in this task was Solomon Juneau, founder of Milwaukee, Wisconsin. Juneau died in the arms of Hunkins while visiting the Menominee tribe. During Juneau's decline, Hunkins had acted as his "faithful friend and constant nurse". He also worked with other Native American tribes, including the Stockbridge, Munsee and Oneida tribes. Hunkins was paid $1,000 per year for the position.

In 1860 Hunkins was elected to the Wisconsin State Assembly for a one-year term. He was on the Swamp Land Committee, whose responsibility was to reimburse the general fund from the Swamp Land Fund. He was considered to be "a gentleman of decided force and marked ability - strong in mind, clear in judgment, logical in conclusion, and admirably fitted to have taken, under favorable surroundings, a prominent part in public affairs".

In 1860 upon hearing that Sherman Booth had been recaptured by federal marshals, Hunkins, who admired Booth, introduced a resolution in the Assembly that the Governor of the State should "declare war against the United States", but the speaker ruled it unconstitutional and it went no further.

Hunkins was unanimously nominated as State Senator and then was nominated as Secretary of State, but he declined the offers.

== Retirement and death ==
After leaving state politics, Hunkins relocated to Beaver Crossing in Nebraska. At the age of 88, Hunkins "retain[ed] his mental vigor and occupi[ed] a high place in the estimation of his large circle of friends in Seward County". He died aged 90 on April 27, 1900.

== Family ==
On February 11, 1843, Hunkins married Sophrona Hollister. They had children. Their daughter Carrie Arvilla Hunkins married the politician Eugene W. Chafin.

Family of Benjamin Hunkins

Captain Robert Hunkins	Lydia Chamerlain
Robert Hastings Hunkins	Hannah Emerson
Eugene W. Chafin	Carrie Arvilla Hunkins	Benjamin Hunkins	Sophrona Hollister

== Legacy ==
The town of Hunkins, Nebraska was named for Hunkins in recognition of his service. It was eventually renamed Cordova because of issues at the post office.

Wisconsin State Assembly
Preceded by Charles T. Deissner	Member of the Wisconsin State Assembly from the Waukesha 4th district January 2, 1860 – January 7, 1861	Succeeded by Myron Gilbert
