= Cordova, Nebraska =

Village in Seward County, Nebraska, United States

- Village
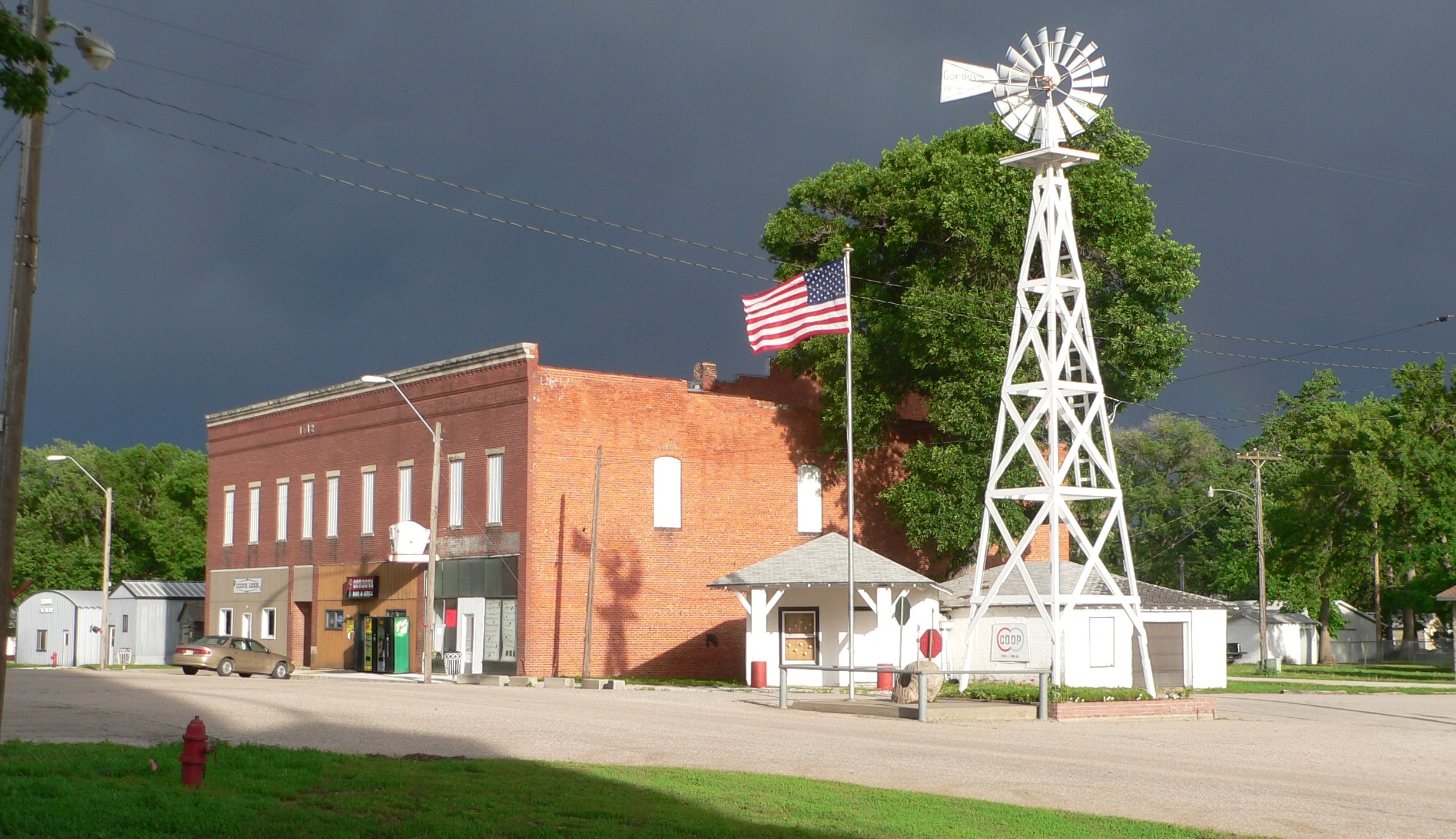
- Downtown Cordova: intersection of Hector and Helen Streets, May 2013

- Location of Cordova, Nebraska
- Coordinates: 40°42′59″N 97°21′06″W
- Country: United States
- State: Nebraska
- County: Seward

Area
  - Total: 0.25 sq mi (0.64 km^{2})
  - Land: 0.25 sq mi (0.64 km^{2})
  - Water: 0 sq mi (0.00 km^{2})
- Elevation: 1,565 ft (477 m)

Population (2020)
  - Total: 92
  - Density: 369.9/sq mi (142.81/km^{2})
- Time zone: UTC-6 (Central (CST))
  - Summer (DST): UTC-5 (CDT)
- ZIP code: 68330
- Area code: 402
- FIPS code: 31-10495
- GNIS feature ID: 2398627

Cordova is a village in Seward County, Nebraska, United States. It is part of the Lincoln, Nebraska Metropolitan Statistical Area. The population was 92 at the 2020 census.

== History ==
Cordova was originally called Hunkins, in honor of pioneer settler Benjamin Hunkins, and under the latter name was platted in 1887 when the Fremont, Elkhorn and Missouri Valley Railroad was extended to that point. Due to the similarity with the name of another post office in the state, Hunkins was soon renamed Cordova, after Cordova, Spain, in order to avoid repetition. A post office called Cordova has been in operation since 1888.

== Geography ==
According to the United States Census Bureau, the village has a total area of 0.25 square miles (0.65 km^{2}), all land.

== Demographics ==
Historical population
Census	Pop.	Note	%±
1900	149		—
1910	201		34.9%
1920	205		2.0%
1930	195		−4.9%
1940	188		−3.6%
1950	147		−21.8%
1960	152		3.4%
1970	141		−7.2%
1980	129		−8.5%
1990	147		14.0%
2000	127		−13.6%
2010	137		7.9%
2020	92		−32.8%
U.S. Decennial Census

=== 2010 census ===
As of the census of 2010, there were 137 people, 61 households, and 37 families residing in the village. The population density was 548.0 inhabitants per square mile (211.6/km^{2}). There were 70 housing units at an average density of 280.0 per square mile (108.1/km^{2}). The racial makeup of the village was 98.5% White, 0.7% from other races, and 0.7% from two or more races. Hispanic or Latino of any race were 1.5% of the population.

There were 61 households, of which 19.7% had children under the age of 18 living with them, 54.1% were married couples living together, 1.6% had a female householder with no husband present, 4.9% had a male householder with no wife present, and 39.3% were non-families. 32.8% of all households were made up of individuals, and 19.7% had someone living alone who was 65 years of age or older. The average household size was 2.25 and the average family size was 2.86.

The median age in the village was 44.3 years. 20.4% of residents were under the age of 18; 6.6% were between the ages of 18 and 24; 24% were from 25 to 44; 24.1% were from 45 to 64; and 24.8% were 65 years of age or older. The gender makeup of the village was 50.4% male and 49.6% female.

=== 2000 census ===
As of the census of 2000, there were 127 people, 62 households, and 38 families residing in the village. The population density was 497.5 inhabitants per square mile (192.1/km^{2}). There were 69 housing units at an average density of 270.3 per square mile (104.4/km^{2}). The racial makeup of the village was 100.00% White.

There were 62 households, out of which 22.6% had children under the age of 18 living with them, 54.8% were married couples living together, 3.2% had a female householder with no husband present, and 37.1% were non-families. 33.9% of all households were made up of individuals, and 16.1% had someone living alone who was 65 years of age or older. The average household size was 2.05 and the average family size was 2.54.

In the village, the population was spread out, with 18.1% under the age of 18, 3.1% from 18 to 24, 28.3% from 25 to 44, 22.8% from 45 to 64, and 27.6% who were 65 years of age or older. The median age was 46 years. For every 100 females, there were 95.4 males. For every 100 females age 18 and over, there were 92.6 males.

As of 2000 the median income for a household in the village was $31,667, and the median income for a family was $36,250. Males had a median income of $29,375 versus $21,750 for females. The per capita income for the village was $16,712. There were no families and 0.8% of the population living below the poverty line, including no under eighteens and 3.7% of those over 64.

== See also ==
- List of municipalities in Nebraska
