= Oliver W. Stewart =

American politician

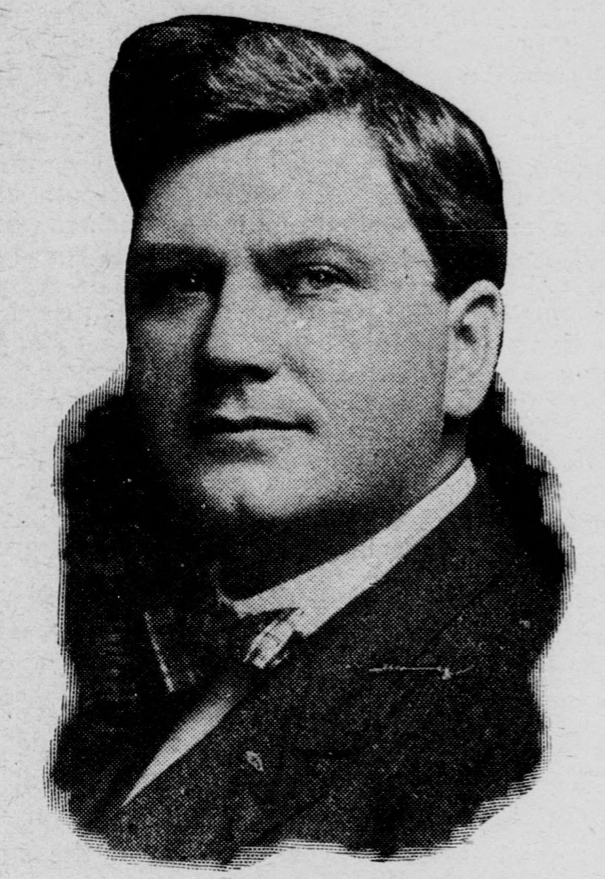
- Stewart in 1907

7th Chairman of the Prohibition Party
- In office 1900–1905
- Preceded by: Samuel Dickie
- Succeeded by: Charles R. Jones

Member of the Illinois House of Representatives from the 5th district
- In office January 7, 1903 – January 4, 1905

Personal details
- Born: Oliver Wayne Stewart; May 22, 1867 Mercer County, Illinois, U.S.
- Died: February 15, 1937 (aged 69) Bloomington, Illinois, U.S.
- Party: Prohibition
- Spouse: Ella Jane Seass
- Education: Eureka College

Oliver Wayne Stewart (May 22, 1867 – February 15, 1937) was an American politician who served as the chairman of the Prohibition Party and in the Illinois state House of Representatives.

== Life ==
Oliver Wayne Stewart was born in Mercer County, Illinois on May 22, 1867, and attended Woodhull High School. He graduated from Eureka College in 1890. Stewart was active in the church and was for several years state evangelist under direction of Missionary Board of Christian church including two years as a pastor in Mackinaw, Illinois and as president of the Illinois Christian Endeavor Union. He also served his alma mater, Eureka College as its finance secretary.

== Prohibition Party activism ==
Stewart was elected as chairman of the Illinois Prohibition Party in 1896 and presided over the 1896 national convention. In 1900, he was elected as chairman of the Prohibition Party. In 1904, General Nelson A. Miles was exploring a run for president with the possibility of running as the nominee of the Prohibition Party. Stewart was opposed to Miles' candidacy as he did not want the party to endorse a former military officer and was wary of Miles' desire to be nominated at the 1904 Democratic National Convention. Though Miles dropped out prior to the Prohibition Party's convention, Stewart was floated as a prospective opponent to General Miles as several state delegations attempted to revive the General's candidacy. Ultimately, the party's nomination went to Silas C. Swallow.

In 1905 he was removed from his position as chairman after he was accused by former presidential nominee John G. Woolley and other prohibitionists of misappropriating over $50,000 and was replaced by Charles R. Jones of Philadelphia.

== Illinois House of Representatives ==
He was elected to the Illinois House of Representatives in the 1902 general election. He was elected to the Illinois House of Representatives from the 5th district alongside Democrat Michael E. Hunt and Republican Aaron Norden. He served in the 43rd General Assembly which commenced January 4, 1903 and adjourned May 7, 1903. The 43rd General Assembly ended January 4, 1905. In 1903, he nominated John G. Woolley, the Prohibition Party's nominee for President in 1900, for the United States Senate. As the legislature's sole Prohibitionist, he was also Woolley's sole vote and the Republican-majority elected Republican Albert J. Hopkins to succeed William Mason.

== Later life ==
After his ouster as chair, he remained active in the temperance movement as a member of the Prohibition Party's National Committee, as an officer of the Prohibition Trust Fund Association, and as a trustee of The Intercollegiate Prohibition Association. He became a public speaker and joined the Flying Squadron of America until his death on February 15, 1937, at Brokaw Hospital in Bloomington, Illinois after a short illness.
