= Clinton N. Howard =

American lecturer and reformer

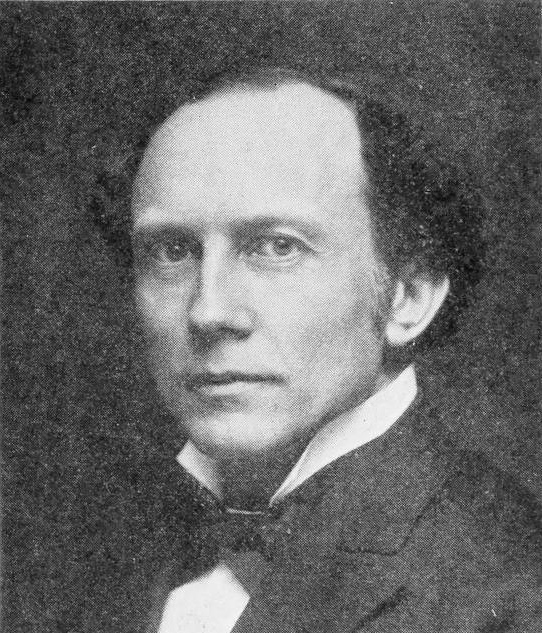
Clinton Norman Howard

Clinton Norman Howard (28 July 1868 – 25 April 1955) was an American lecturer and reformer, advocate of social justice, law enforcement, equal rights, and a Chairman in the World Peace Commission.

== Genealogy ==
Clinton N. Howard came from a long line of Quaker ancestry. They were preachers, abolitionists, reformers and statesman prison reformers. His relatives consist of Jon Howard a prison reformer and Sir John Howard a Lord Treasurer who commanded the British Army at Flodden Field. Sir John Howard was imprisoned for three years in the Tower of London because he advocated reforms that the crowds disapproved of. Clinton Howard has a long line of family that is famous in England for splendid honor and true aristocracy. Clinton’s great, great grandfather settled in Massachusetts from England. He was a soldier in the American Revolutionary War. He was imprisoned but later on released because of his relations to the royal family in England. Clinton’s great, great grandfather’s son who was a reverend, Enos Howard, was the father of Reverend Benjamin Howard who is Clinton N. Howard’s father.

== Life ==
By thirty years old Clinton became famous for being an orator and reformer. He traveled around the states where he conducted campaigns for civic righteousness. That is where he got his famous nickname "The Little Giant" of the reform platform. In Rochester, New York he conducted a Sunday afternoon forum. For ten years he had lectured to record-breaking audiences, including three thousand men that were in the Men’s Christian Union. He delivered five hundred lectures in Rochester, New York that mostly consists of men that overflow the largest churches and auditoriums. Clinton N. Howard is famous in the New York Civic League, the American Sabbath Association, the National Temperance Society, and the American Civic Reform Union. Clinton had six lectures that are about the public uplift to get the world back to Eden. Clinton attended the Prohibition Party’s national convention, which was held at the Steel Pier in Atlantic City, New Jersey. Clinton Howard believed that the Prohibition Party was the true Coe progressive party in the campaign of 1912 when Teddy Roosevelt was president. Clinton, who was 43 years old at the time, brought the gathering to its feet when he questioned how the former President could possibly talk about stealing votes when he himself had stolen the Panama Canal.
