= National Register of Historic Places listings in Saline County, Nebraska =

Location of Saline County in Nebraska

Saline County, Nebraska, United States, has 20 properties and districts listed on the National Register of Historic Places. Another site that was once listed on the register has since been removed.

The locations of National Register properties and districts for which the latitude and longitude coordinates are included below may be seen in a map.

This National Park Service list is complete through NPS recent listings posted October 30, 2026.

== Current listings ==
| | Name on the Register | Image | Date listed | Location | City or town | Description |
|---|---|---|---|---|---|---|
| 1 | Jesse C. Bickle House | Jesse C. Bickle House | November 23, 1977 (#77000838) | West 13th Street; 40°37′37″N 96°58′03″W | Crete | Carpenter Gothic house built by Crete's founder in the 1870s; owned and operated as park by Crete Heritage Society. |
| 2 | College Hill Historic District | College Hill Historic District | February 10, 1983 (#83001101) | Roughly bounded by Juniper, 15th, Boswell and 9th Sts. 40°37′26″N 96°57′16″W | Crete | |
| 3 | Crete Downtown Historic District | Crete Downtown Historic District | July 25, 2016 (#16000482) | Centered on Main Avenue and 13th Street; 40°37′31″N 96°57′41″W | Crete | |
| 4 | Doane College Historic Buildings | Doane College Historic Buildings | August 16, 1977 (#77000836) | Doane College campus 40°37′19″N 96°57′03″W | Crete | |
| 5 | Hotel Wilber | Hotel Wilber | September 20, 1978 (#78001709) | 2nd and Wilson Sts. 40°28′56″N 96°57′42″W | Wilber | |
| 6 | Johnston-Muff House | Johnston-Muff House | September 19, 1977 (#77000837) | 1422 Boswell Ave. 40°37′35″N 96°57′05″W | Crete | |
| 7 | Richard R. Kiddle House | Richard R. Kiddle House | September 12, 1985 (#85002143) | 819 8th St. 40°38′52″N 97°16′58″W | Friend | |
| 8 | Mann-Zwonecek House | Mann-Zwonecek House | December 29, 1978 (#78001710) | 524 W. 1st St. 40°29′01″N 96°57′59″W | Wilber | |
| 9 | Frank Pisar Farmstead | Frank Pisar Farmstead | August 6, 1986 (#86002275) | Address Restricted | Dorchester | |
| 10 | Rad Saline Center cis. 389 Z.C.B.J. | Rad Saline Center cis. 389 Z.C.B.J. | January 4, 1996 (#95001483) | 2202 M, about 9 miles north of Western; 40°31′29″N 97°10′43″W | Western | |
| 11 | Frank J. Rademacher House | Frank J. Rademacher House | March 11, 1980 (#80002460) | 1424 Grove St. 40°37′35″N 96°57′14″W | Crete | |
| 12 | Saline County Bank | Saline County Bank | April 5, 1990 (#90000568) | 100 N. West Avenue; 40°23′37″N 97°11′52″W | Western | |
| 13 | Saline County Courthouse | Saline County Courthouse | July 5, 1990 (#90000967) | 215 S. Court; 40°28′55″N 96°57′56″W | Wilber | |
| 14 | Sokol Pavilion | Sokol Pavilion | July 23, 1998 (#98000892) | 315 S. Wilson St. 40°28′50″N 96°57′41″W | Wilber | |
| 15 | Telocvicna Jednota "T.J." Sokol Hall | Telocvicna Jednota "T.J." Sokol Hall | November 26, 2003 (#03001214) | 12th St. and Norman Ave. 40°37′28″N 96°57′45″W | Crete | |
| 16 | Telocvicna Jednota Sokol Hall | Telocvicna Jednota Sokol Hall | January 18, 1985 (#85000110) | Southwest of Wilber at county roads 1800 and Q 40°27′58″N 97°02′46″W | Wilber | |
| 17 | Trinity Memorial Episcopal Church | Trinity Memorial Episcopal Church | September 14, 1979 (#79001453) | 14th and Juniper Sts. 40°37′35″N 96°57′28″W | Crete | |
| 18 | Warren's Opera House | Warren's Opera House | September 28, 1988 (#88000945) | 511 2nd St. 40°39′13″N 97°17′15″W | Friend | |
| 19 | Michael Witt Fachwerkbau | | January 14, 1980 (#80002462) | Address Restricted; 40°24′18″N 97°09′14″W | Western | |
| 20 | Z.C.B.J. Rad Tabor No. 74 | Z.C.B.J. Rad Tabor No. 74 | August 23, 1985 (#85001798) | 1402 I Road; 40°34′57″N 97°07′21″W | Dorchester | |

=== Former listing ===
| | Name on the Register | Image | Date listed | Date removed | Location | City or town | Description |
|---|---|---|---|---|---|---|---|
| 1 | William Freidell House | | October 3, 1980 (#80002461) | September 7, 2005 | 10th and Main Streets | Dorchester | Delisted due to loss of integrity after substantial remodeling. |

== See also ==
- List of National Historic Landmarks in Nebraska
- National Register of Historic Places listings in Nebraska
