= Johnston House =

Johnston House may refer to:

- Asa Johnston Farmhouse, Johnsonville, Alabama, listed on the National Register of Historic Places (NRHP) in Conecuh County
- James Johnston House (Half Moon Bay, California), listed on the NRHP in San Mateo County
- Darius David Johnston House, Norwalk, California, listed on the NRHP in Los Angeles County
- Johnston-Felton-Hay House, a.k.a. Johnston-Hay House, Macon, Georgia, a National Historic Landmark
- Johnston House (Clay Village, Kentucky), listed on the NRHP in Shelby County
- Johnston-Jacobs House, Georgetown, Kentucky, NRHP-listed in Scott County
- John Johnston House (Sault Ste. Marie, Michigan), NRHP-listed
- Johnston House (Carthage, Missouri), listed on the NRHP in Jasper County
- Overfelt-Campbell-Johnston House, Independence, Missouri, listed on the NRHP in Jackson County
- John S. Johnston House, Missoula, Montana, listed on the NRHP in Missoula County
- Johnston-Muff House, Crete, Nebraska, listed on the NRHP in Saline County
- Edwin M. and Emily S. Johnston House, Buffalo, New York, NRHP-listed
- Capt. Simon Johnston House, Clayton, New York, NRHP-listed
- Knox-Johnstone House, Cleveland, North Carolina, listed on the NRHP in Rowan County
- John Johnston House (Yanceyville, North Carolina), listed on the National Register of Historic Places in Caswell County
- William C. Johnston House and General Store, Burlington, Ohio, listed on the NRHP in Lawrence County
- Johnston-Crossland House, Zanesville, Ohio, listed on the NRHP in Muskingum County
- Andrew J. and Anna B. Johnston Farmstead, Oregon City, Oregon, listed on the NRHP in Clackamas County
- Lucas-Johnston House, Newport, Rhode Island, NRHP-listed
- James Johnston House (Brentwood, Tennessee), NRHP-listed
- Andrew Johnston House, Pearisburg, Virginia, NRHP-listed
- Johnston-Meek House, Huntington, West Virginia, NRHP-listed
- Johnston-Truax House, Weirton, West Virginia, NRHP-listed

== See also ==
- Johnston Hall (disambiguation)
- James Johnston House (disambiguation)
- John Johnston House (disambiguation)

as well as similar spellings

- Johnson House (disambiguation)
