= Telocvicna Jednota Sokol =

Telocvicna Jednota Sokol may refer to:

- Telocvicna Jednota Sokol Hall, Nebraska, US
- Telocvicna Jednota "T.J." Sokol Hall, Nebraska, US

== See also ==
- Czech Sokol movement
- Sokol Gymnasium
