= Jesse C. Bickle House =

- U.S. National Register of Historic Places
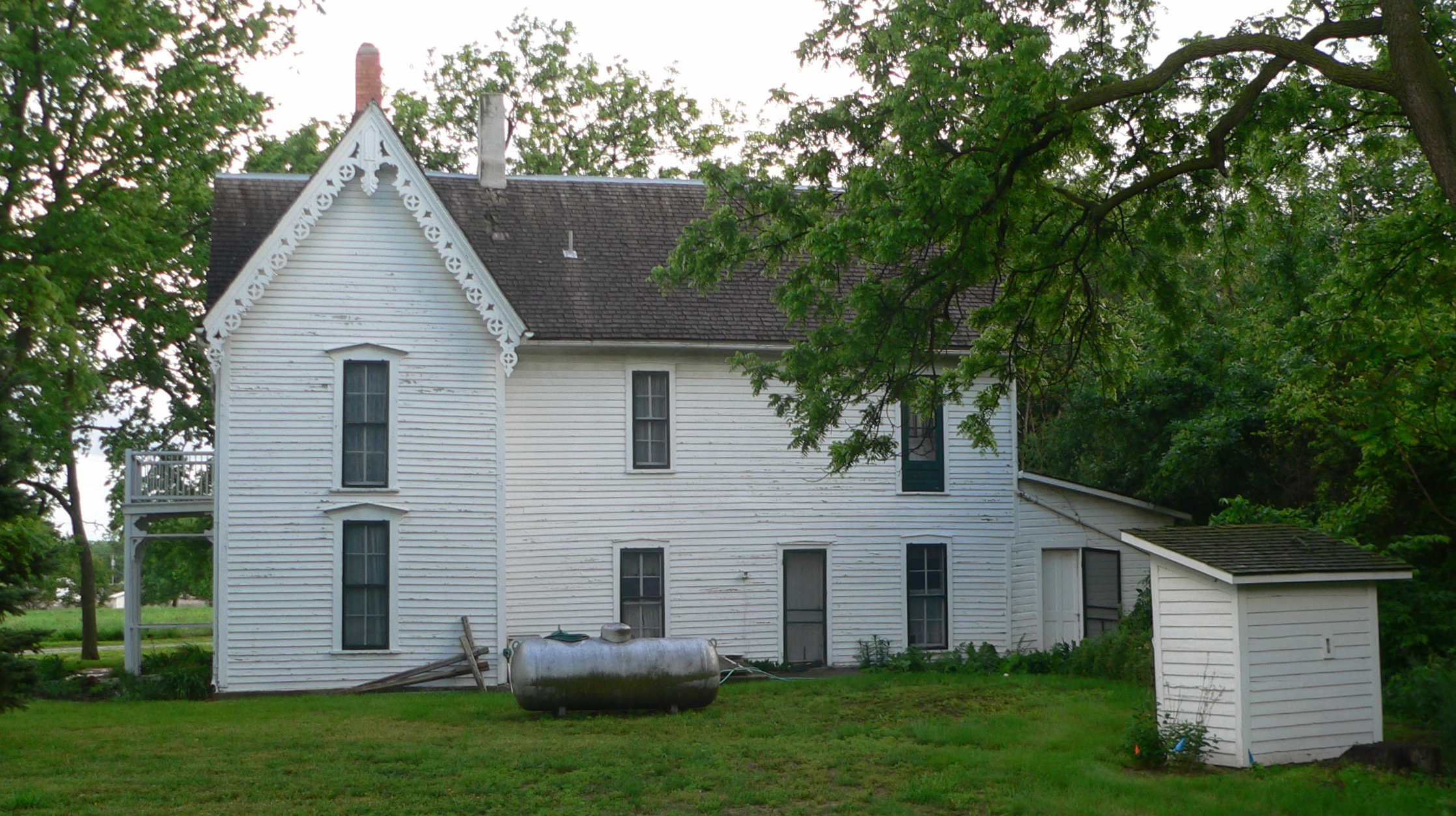
- The house in 2013

- Location within Nebraska Location within the United States
- Nearest city: Crete, Nebraska
- Coordinates: 40°37′37″N 96°58′03″W
- Area: 18 acres (7.3 ha)
- Built: 1864
- Architectural style: Late Gothic Revival, carpenter Gothic
- NRHP reference No.: 77000838
- Added to NRHP: November 23, 1977

The Jesse C. Bickle House, also known as The Maples, is a historic house in Crete, Nebraska. It was built by homesteader Jesse C. Bickle as a one-story log house in 1864, and a second story was added in the 1870s. Bickle owned a brickyard in Crete and a store in Pleasant Hill. The house was designed in the Carpenter Gothic architectural style. It was purchased by Milton O. Smith in 1923, and renamed The Maples. It has been listed on the National Register of Historic Places since November 23, 1977.
