= Saline County Bank =

Historic building in Western, Nebraska, United States

- U.S. National Register of Historic Places
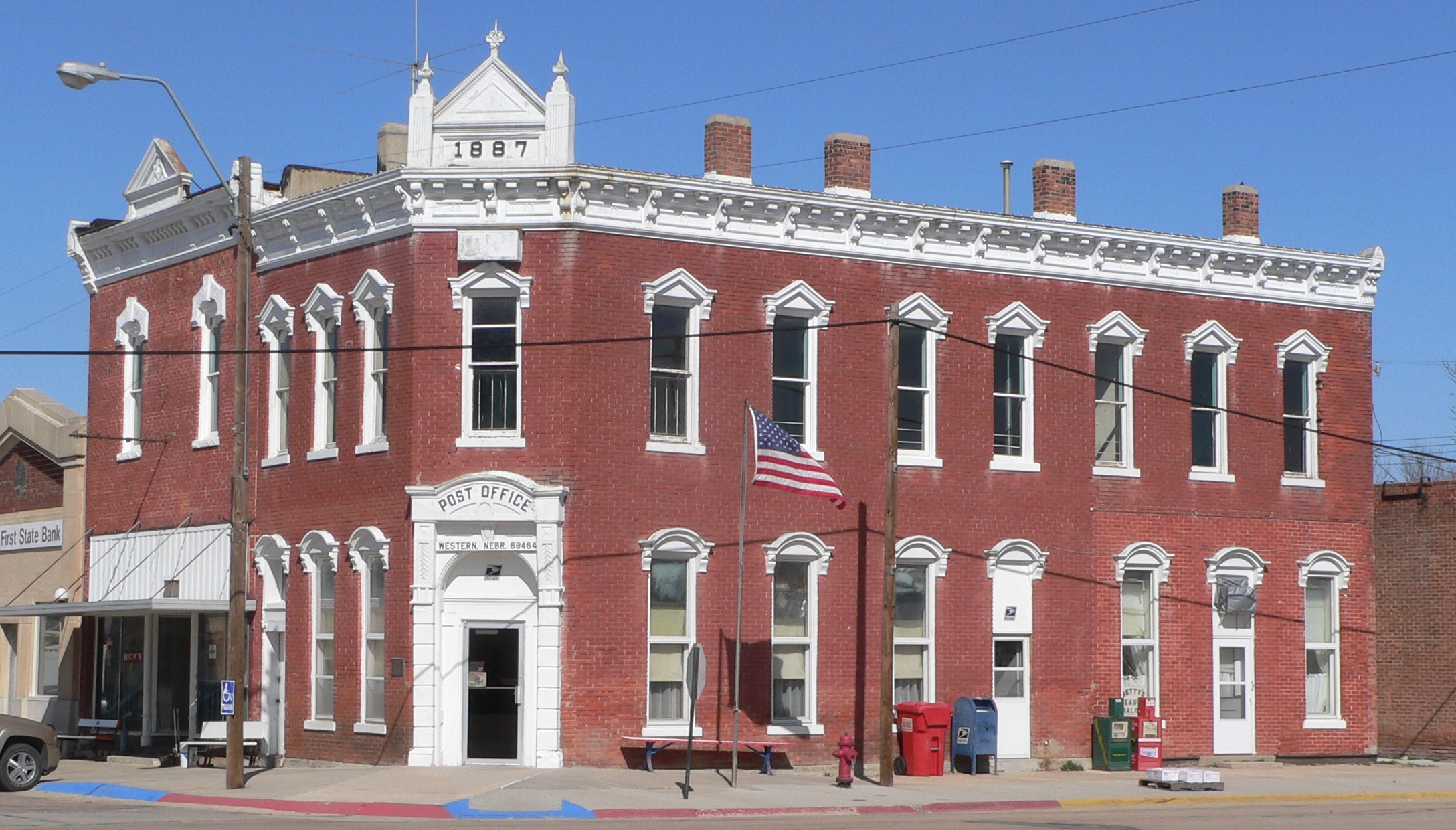
- The building in 2012

- Location within Nebraska Location within the United States
- Location: E of SR 15 in downtown Western, Western, Nebraska
- Coordinates: 40°23′37″N 97°11′50″W
- Area: less than one acre
- Built: 1887
- Architectural style: Italianate
- NRHP reference No.: 90000568
- Added to NRHP: April 5, 1990

The Saline County Bank is a historic building in the village of Western Nebraska, United States, that is listed on the National Register of Historic Places (NRHP). It currently serves as the village's post office.

== Description ==
The structure was built in 1887 to house the Saline County Bank, whose president was George F. Sawyer. It was designed in the Italianate architectural style. The building initially belonged to William Bench, and it was acquired by Sawyer in 1889, followed by the bank itself in 1896. It later became Western's post office. It has been listed on the NRHP since April 5, 1990.

== See also ==
- National Register of Historic Places listings in Saline County, Nebraska
