= Saline County Courthouse =

Saline County Courthouse may refer to:

- Saline County Courthouse (Arkansas), Benton, Arkansas
- Saline County Courthouse (Kansas), Salina, Kansas
- Saline County Courthouse (Missouri), Marshall, Missouri
- Saline County Courthouse (Nebraska), Wilber, Nebraska
