= Tri-County School District =

Tri-County School District or Tri County Schools may refer to:

- Tri-County School District (Arkansas)
- Tri-County School District (Iowa)
- Tri County Area Schools - Michigan
- Tri-County School District (Minnesota)
- Tri County Public Schools - Nebraska
