= Trinity Memorial Episcopal Church (Crete, Nebraska) =

- U.S. National Register of Historic Places
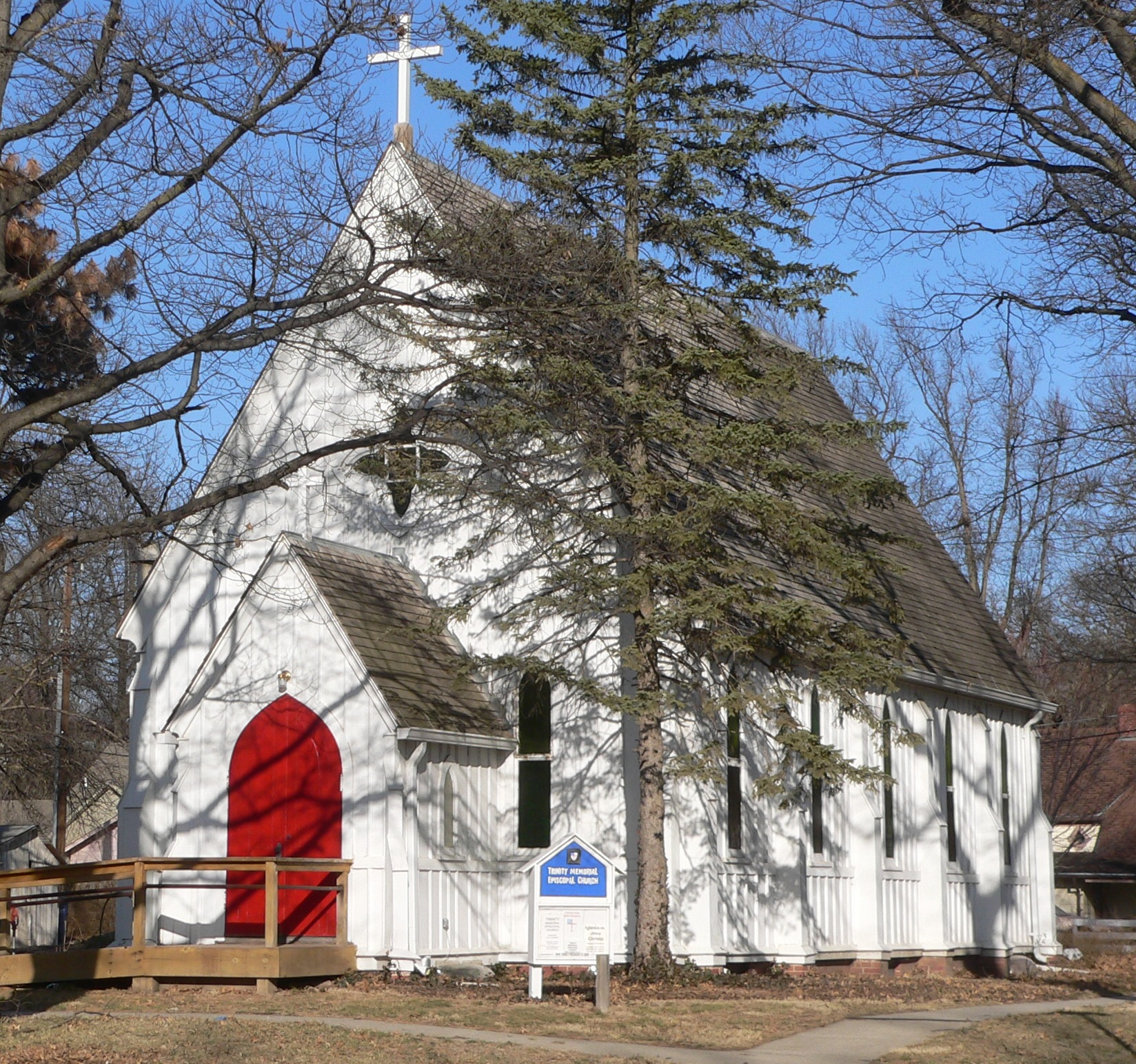
- The church in 2012

- Location within Nebraska Location within the United States
- Location: 14th and Juniper Streets, Crete, Nebraska
- Coordinates: 40°37′33″N 96°57′27″W
- Area: less than one acre
- Built: 1872
- Architectural style: Late Gothic Revival
- NRHP reference No.: 79001453
- Added to NRHP: September 14, 1979

The Trinity Memorial Episcopal Church is a historic church building in Crete, Nebraska. It was built for the Episcopal Church in 1872, and extended in 1889 and 1896. By the late 1890s, most parishioners were immigrants from Bohemia (now known as the Czech Republic). Attendance declined, and the church "was closed seven times between 1896-1938". The building was designed in the Late Gothic Revival architectural style. It has been listed on the National Register of Historic Places since September 14, 1979.
