= John Johnston House =

John Johnston House may refer to:

- John Johnston House (Sault Ste. Marie, Michigan), listed on the National Register of Historic Places (NRHP)
- John S. Johnston House, Missoula, Montana, listed on the NRHP in Missoula County, Montana
- John Johnston House (Yanceyville, North Carolina), listed on the NRHP in Caswell County, North Carolina

== See also ==
- John H. Johnston Cotton Gin Historic District, Levesque, Arkansas, listed on the National Register of Historic Places in Cross County, Arkansas
- Johnston House (disambiguation)
