= Saline County, Nebraska =

County in Nebraska, United States

Coordinates: 40.53°N 97.14°W

Saline County
- County
- County of Saline
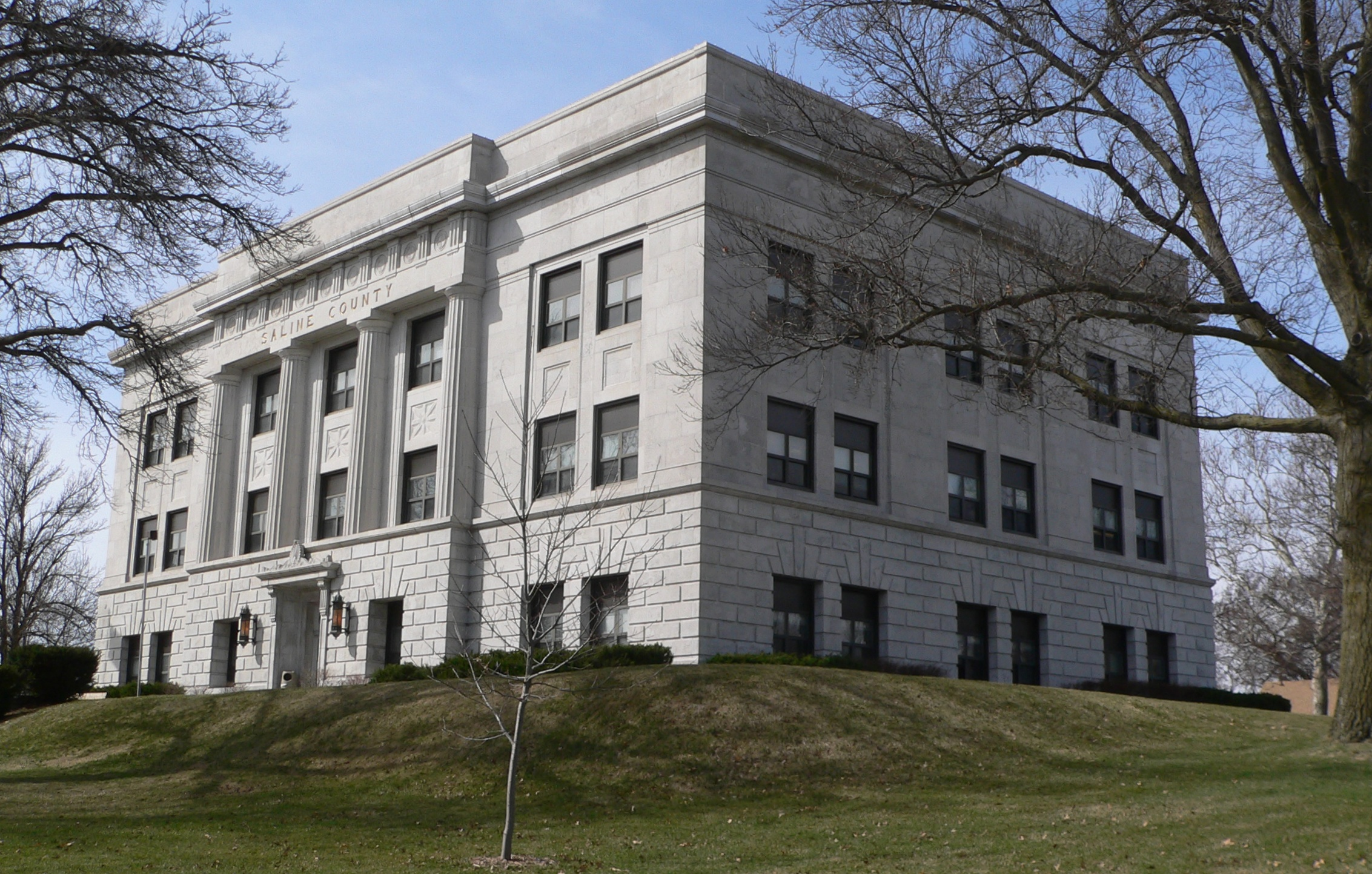
- Saline County Courthouse in Wilber
- Interactive map of Saline County
- Location within the U.S. state of Nebraska
- Country: United States
- State: Nebraska
- Established: March 16, 1855
- Organized: February 18, 1867
- County seat: Wilber
- Largest city: Crete

Area
  - Total: 576 sq mi (1,490 km^{2})
  - Land: 574 sq mi (1,490 km^{2})
  - Water: 2.3 sq mi (6.0 km^{2})

Population (2020)
  - Total: 14,292
  - Estimate (2025): 14,996 ▲
  - Density: 24.9/sq mi (9.61/km^{2})
- Time zone: UTC−6 (Central)
  - Summer (DST): UTC−5 (CDT)
- Area code: 402/531
- FIPS code: 31151
- GNIS feature ID: 835897
- Website: salinecountyne.gov

Saline County (/sə.ˈliːn/ suh-LEAN) is a county in the U.S. state of Nebraska. As of the 2020 United States census, the population was 14,292. Its county seat is Wilber.

In the Nebraska license plate system, Saline County is represented by the prefix 22 (it had the twenty-second-largest number of vehicles registered in the state when the license plate system was established in 1922).

== History ==
Saline County was formed in 1855 and organized in 1867. The first permanent settler arrived in 1858.

== Geography ==
The terrain of Saline County is composed of low rolling hills, sloping to the east-southeast. Most of the county's area is devoted to agriculture. The Big Blue River flows southward in the eastern part of the county. The middle and southern parts of the county are drained by Swan Creek and Turkey Creek, which combine and discharge into Big Blue River at the county's east boundary line close to its SE corner. The county has an area of 576 square miles (1,490 km^{2}), of which 574 square miles (1,490 km^{2}) is land and 2.3 square miles (6.0 km^{2}) (0.4%) is water.

=== Major highways ===
- U.S. Highway 6
- Nebraska Highway 15
- Nebraska Highway 33
- Nebraska Highway 41
- Nebraska Highway 74
- Nebraska Highway 103

=== Adjacent counties ===
- Lancaster County – northeast
- Gage County – southeast
- Jefferson County – south
- Thayer County – southwest
- Fillmore County – west
- York County – northwest
- Seward County – north

=== Protected areas ===
- Willard Meyer Natural Resource District - Swan Lake

== Demographics ==
Historical population
Census	Pop.	Note	%±
1860	39		—
1870	3,106		7,864.1%
1880	14,491		366.5%
1890	20,097		38.7%
1900	18,252		−9.2%
1910	17,866		−2.1%
1920	16,514		−7.6%
1930	16,536		0.1%
1940	15,010		−9.2%
1950	14,046		−6.4%
1960	12,542		−10.7%
1970	12,809		2.1%
1980	13,131		2.5%
1990	12,715		−3.2%
2000	13,843		8.9%
2010	14,200		2.6%
2020	14,292		0.6%
2025 (est.)	14,996	▲	4.9%
US Decennial Census; 1790-1960 1900-1990; 1990-2000 2010

=== 2020 census ===
As of the 2020 census, the county had a population of 14,292. The median age was 36.9 years. 26.6% of residents were under the age of 18 and 16.8% of residents were 65 years of age or older. For every 100 females there were 103.9 males, and for every 100 females age 18 and over there were 101.4 males age 18 and over.

The racial makeup of the county was 69.2% White, 1.0% Black or African American, 1.4% American Indian and Alaska Native, 1.9% Asian, 0.3% Native Hawaiian and Pacific Islander, 16.1% from some other race, and 10.0% from two or more races. Hispanic or Latino residents of any race comprised 28.5% of the population.

48.7% of residents lived in urban areas, while 51.3% lived in rural areas.

There were 5,222 households in the county, of which 35.1% had children under the age of 18 living with them and 22.0% had a female householder with no spouse or partner present. About 26.6% of all households were made up of individuals and 12.6% had someone living alone who was 65 years of age or older.

There were 5,714 housing units, of which 8.6% were vacant. Among occupied housing units, 70.6% were owner-occupied and 29.4% were renter-occupied. The homeowner vacancy rate was 1.2% and the rental vacancy rate was 7.4%.

=== 2000 census ===
As of the 2000 United States census, there were 13,843 people, 5,188 households, and 3,507 families in the county. The population density was 24 people per square mile (9.3 people/km^{2}). There were 5,611 housing units at an average density of 10 units per square mile (3.9 units/km^{2}). The racial makeup of the county was 92.99% White, 0.36% Black or African American, 0.38% Native American, 1.70% Asian, 0.03% Pacific Islander, 3.40% from other races, and 1.15% from two or more races. 6.58% of the population were Hispanic or Latino of any race.

There were 5,188 households, out of which 32.80% had children under the age of 18 living with them, 56.50% were married couples living together, 7.20% had a female householder with no husband present, and 32.40% were non-families. 27.50% of all households were made up of individuals, and 14.30% had someone living alone who was 65 years of age or older. The average household size was 2.50 and the average family size was 3.04.

The county population contained 25.10% under the age of 18, 12.30% from 18 to 24, 25.00% from 25 to 44, 20.30% from 45 to 64, and 17.20% who were 65 years of age or older. The median age was 36 years. For every 100 females there were 97.80 males. For every 100 females age 18 and over, there were 95.10 males.

The median income for a household in the county was $35,914, and the median income for a family was $44,199. Males had a median income of $30,467 versus $22,690 for females. The per capita income for the county was $16,287. About 6.40% of families and 9.40% of the population were below the poverty line, including 8.90% of those under age 18 and 9.00% of those age 65 or over.

== Communities ==
=== Cities ===
- Crete
- Friend
- Wilber (county seat)

=== Villages ===
- De Witt
- Dorchester
- Swanton
- Tobias
- Western

=== Unincorporated communities ===
- Berks
- Pleasant Hill
- Shestak

== Politics ==
Saline County was formerly strongly Democratic, voting Republican only four times between 1900 and 1968. From 1972 to 2008, it was considered a swing county in presidential elections, supporting the national winner in every election except 1988 and consistently voting similarly to the national popular vote. However, in 2016, the county swung to the right, and since that election has weighed in as more than 20 percentage points more Republican than the nation.

United States presidential election results for Saline County, Nebraska
Year	Republican		Democratic		Third party(ies)	
Year	No.	%	No.	%	No.	%
1900	2,238	51.31%	2,018	46.26%	106	2.43%
1904	2,390	61.38%	1,108	28.45%	396	10.17%
1908	2,048	46.48%	2,249	51.04%	109	2.47%
1912	1,185	29.74%	1,942	48.73%	858	21.53%
1916	1,469	35.10%	2,646	63.23%	70	1.67%
1920	3,197	58.67%	2,172	39.86%	80	1.47%
1924	2,834	43.10%	3,123	47.49%	619	9.41%
1928	3,347	45.67%	3,955	53.97%	26	0.35%
1932	1,993	25.24%	5,831	73.85%	72	0.91%
1936	2,637	32.14%	5,480	66.78%	89	1.08%
1940	3,673	46.48%	4,229	53.52%	0	0.00%
1944	3,255	45.50%	3,899	54.50%	0	0.00%
1948	2,641	42.33%	3,598	57.67%	0	0.00%
1952	4,221	60.19%	2,792	39.81%	0	0.00%
1956	3,248	48.89%	3,395	51.11%	0	0.00%
1960	2,881	44.99%	3,523	55.01%	0	0.00%
1964	1,780	30.14%	4,125	69.86%	0	0.00%
1968	2,341	44.73%	2,543	48.59%	350	6.69%
1972	2,828	51.59%	2,654	48.41%	0	0.00%
1976	2,330	41.15%	3,205	56.61%	127	2.24%
1980	2,934	54.17%	1,908	35.23%	574	10.60%
1984	2,942	54.54%	2,385	44.22%	67	1.24%
1988	2,355	42.75%	3,125	56.73%	29	0.53%
1992	1,740	30.18%	2,425	42.06%	1,600	27.75%
1996	1,945	37.58%	2,523	48.75%	707	13.66%
2000	2,581	50.17%	2,321	45.11%	243	4.72%
2004	3,071	55.17%	2,420	43.48%	75	1.35%
2008	2,434	46.35%	2,674	50.92%	143	2.72%
2012	2,557	51.57%	2,289	46.17%	112	2.26%
2016	3,004	58.49%	1,733	33.74%	399	7.77%
2020	3,631	62.82%	1,986	34.36%	163	2.82%
2024	3,734	65.84%	1,855	32.71%	82	1.45%

== Education ==
School districts include:

- Crete Public Schools
- Exeter-Milligan Public Schools
- Dorchester Public Schools
- Friend Public Schools
- Meridian Public Schools
- Milford Public Schools
- Tri County Public Schools
- Wilber-Clatonia Public Schools

== See also ==
- National Register of Historic Places listings in Saline County, Nebraska
