= Plymouth, Nebraska =

- Village
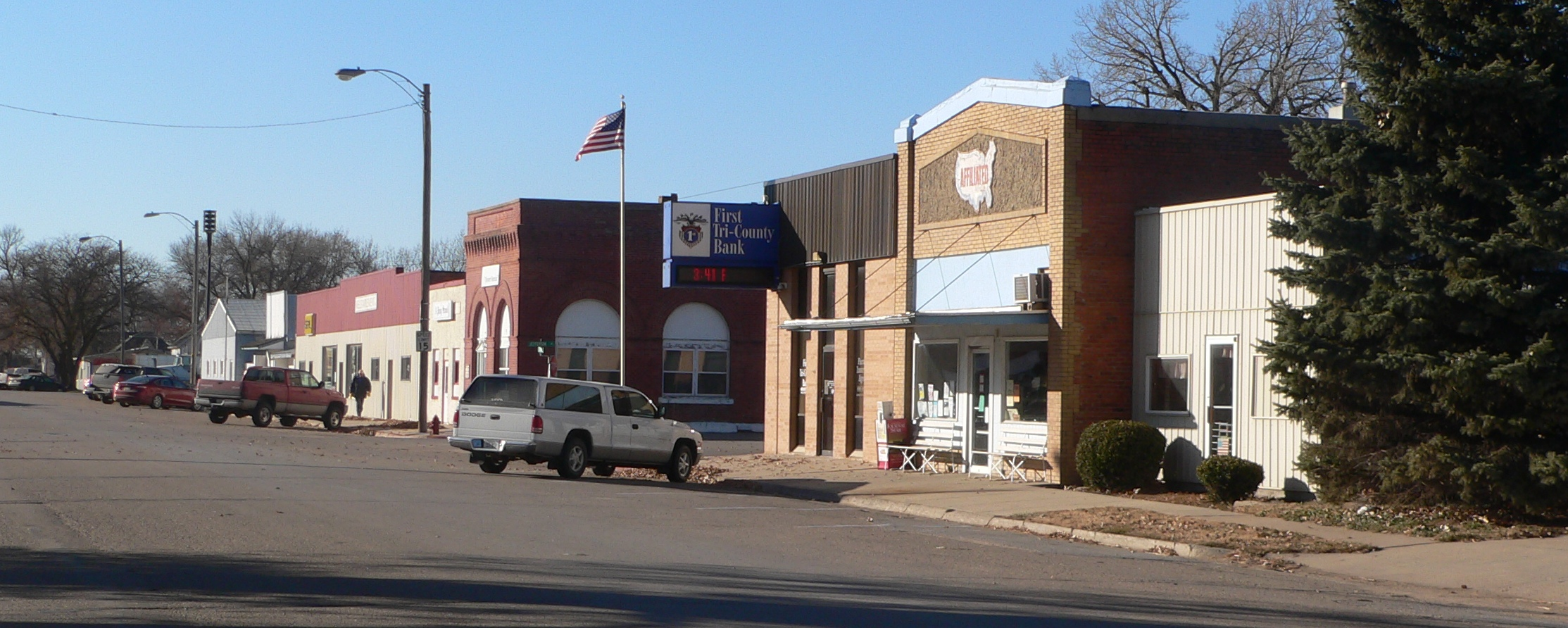
- Main Street

- Location of Plymouth, Nebraska
- Coordinates: 40°18′09″N 96°59′19″W
- Country: United States
- State: Nebraska
- County: Jefferson

Area
  - Total: 0.32 sq mi (0.82 km^{2})
  - Land: 0.32 sq mi (0.82 km^{2})
  - Water: 0 sq mi (0.00 km^{2})
- Elevation: 1,431 ft (436 m)

Population (2020)
  - Total: 363
  - Estimate (2021): 359
  - Density: 1,100/sq mi (440/km^{2})
- Time zone: UTC-6 (Central (CST))
  - Summer (DST): UTC-5 (CDT)
- ZIP code: 68424
- Area code: 402
- FIPS code: 31-39590
- GNIS feature ID: 2398990

Plymouth is a village in Jefferson County, Nebraska, United States. The population was 363 at the 2020 census.

== History ==
Plymouth was founded in 1872 by a colony of settlers from New England, who named the settlement after Plymouth, Massachusetts. When the railroad was built through the neighborhood in 1884, the town moved approximately 3 miles (4.8 km) in order to be situated on the new line.

== Geography ==
According to the United States Census Bureau, the village has a total area of 0.32 square miles (0.83 km^{2}), all land.

== Demographics ==
Historical population
Census	Pop.	Note	%±
1900	195		—
1910	438		124.6%
1920	453		3.4%
1930	418		−7.7%
1940	434		3.8%
1950	348		−19.8%
1960	372		6.9%
1970	424		14.0%
1980	506		19.3%
1990	455		−10.1%
2000	477		4.8%
2010	409		−14.3%
2020	364		−11.0%
2021 (est.)	359	▼	−1.4%
U.S. Decennial Census

=== 2010 census ===
As of the census of 2010, there were 409 people, 186 households, and 120 families residing in the village. The population density was 1,278.1 inhabitants per square mile (493.5/km^{2}). There were 205 housing units at an average density of 640.6 per square mile (247.3/km^{2}). The racial makeup of the village was 99.8% White and 0.2% from other races. Hispanic or Latino of any race were 1.0% of the population.

There were 186 households, of which 25.8% had children under the age of 18 living with them, 54.8% were married couples living together, 7.0% had a female householder with no husband present, 2.7% had a male householder with no wife present, and 35.5% were non-families. 33.3% of all households were made up of individuals, and 15.6% had someone living alone who was 65 years of age or older. The average household size was 2.20 and the average family size was 2.79.

The median age in the village was 41.8 years. 23% of residents were under the age of 18; 4.7% were between the ages of 18 and 24; 24.9% were from 25 to 44; 25.6% were from 45 to 64; and 21.8% were 65 years of age or older. The gender makeup of the village was 49.1% male and 50.9% female.

=== 2000 census ===
As of the census of 2000, there were 477 people, 198 households, and 144 families residing in the village. The population density was 1,727.8 inhabitants per square mile (667.1/km^{2}). There were 211 housing units at an average density of 764.3 per square mile (295.1/km^{2}). The racial makeup of the village was 99.37% White, 0.42% from other races, and 0.21% from two or more races. Hispanic or Latino of any race were 0.84% of the population.

There were 198 households, out of which 33.3% had children under the age of 18 living with them, 63.6% were married couples living together, 6.6% had a female householder with no husband present, and 26.8% were non-families. 26.3% of all households were made up of individuals, and 16.2% had someone living alone who was 65 years of age or older. The average household size was 2.41 and the average family size was 2.88.

In the village, the population was spread out, with 25.6% under the age of 18, 5.0% from 18 to 24, 26.2% from 25 to 44, 23.9% from 45 to 64, and 19.3% who were 65 years of age or older. The median age was 40 years. For every 100 females, there were 97.1 males. For every 100 females age 18 and over, there were 90.9 males.

The median income for a household in the village was $37,159, and the median income for a family was $42,813. Males had a median income of $27,054 versus $19,531 for females. The per capita income for the village was $16,463. About 1.5% of families and 4.8% of the population were below the poverty line, including 1.7% of those under age 18 and 14.4% of those age 65 or over.

== Education ==
Plymouth is served by Tri County Public Schools, which was established in 1966 as a consolidation of various school districts.

St. Paul's Lutheran School is a Christian school of the Wisconsin Evangelical Lutheran Synod (WELS) in Plymouth.
