= Swanton, Nebraska =

Village in Saline County, Nebraska, united States

- Village
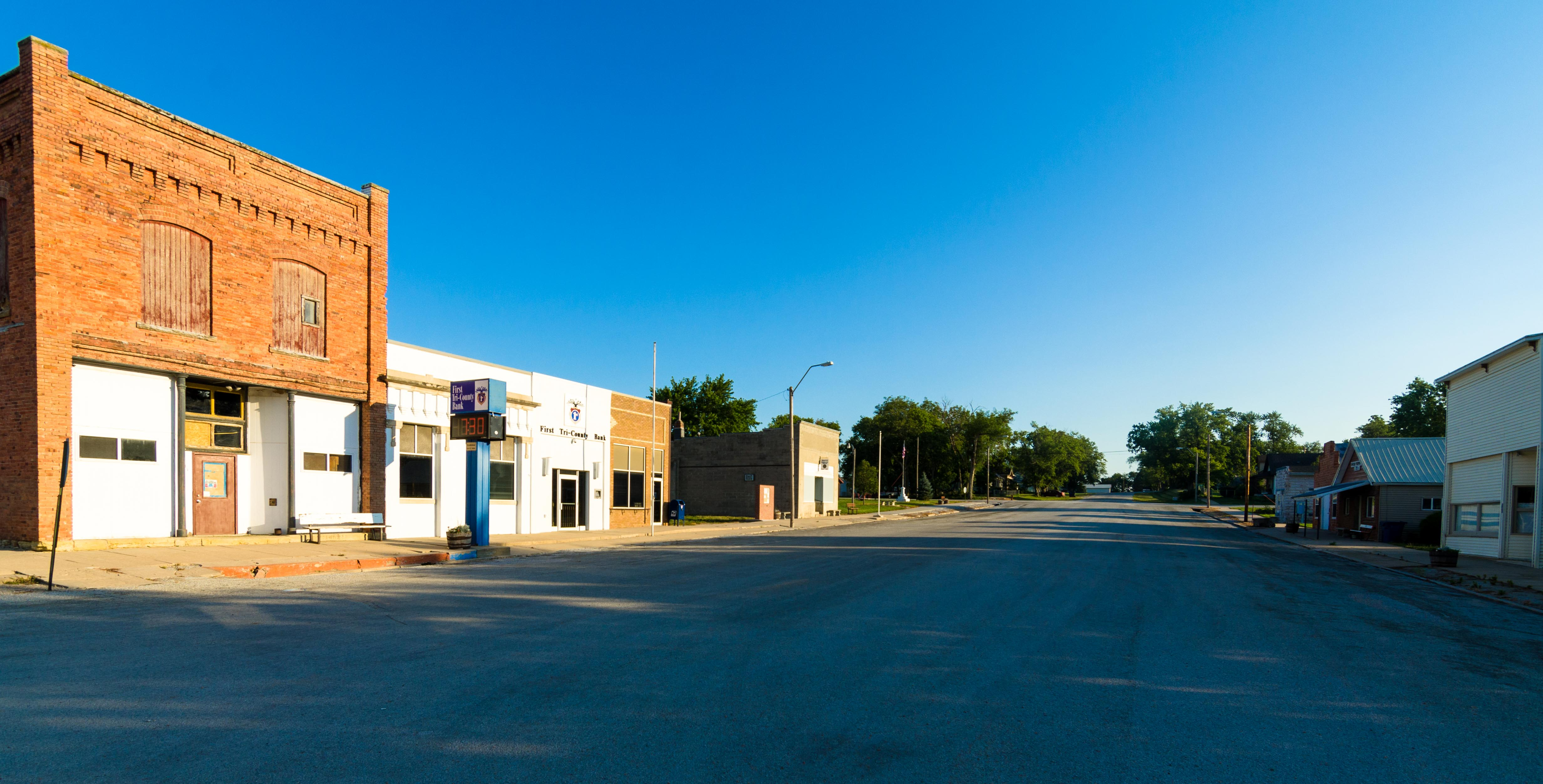
- Main Street in Swanton, July 2017

- Location of Swanton, Nebraska
- Coordinates: 40°22′47″N 97°04′47″W
- Country: United States
- State: Nebraska
- County: Saline

Area
  - Total: 0.20 sq mi (0.52 km^{2})
  - Land: 0.20 sq mi (0.52 km^{2})
  - Water: 0 sq mi (0.00 km^{2})
- Elevation: 1,362 ft (415 m)

Population (2020)
  - Total: 75
  - Estimate (2021): 73
  - Density: 370/sq mi (140/km^{2})
- Time zone: UTC-6 (Central (CST))
  - Summer (DST): UTC-5 (CDT)
- ZIP code: 68445
- Area code: 402
- FIPS code: 31-48060
- GNIS feature ID: 2399941

Swanton is a village in Saline County, Nebraska, United States. The population was 75 at the 2020 census.

== Geography ==
Swanton is located at 40°22′45″N 97°4′48″W (40.379298, -97.080011).

According to the United States Census Bureau, the village has a total area of 0.20 square miles (0.52 km^{2}), all land.

== History ==
Swanton was originally called Morris, and under the later name was established in 1883 when the railroad was extended to that point. Due to the existence of another town called Morris in Nebraska, Morris was later renamed Swanton, after the Swan Creek nearby, in order to avoid repetition.

== Demographics ==
Historical population
Census	Pop.	Note	%±
1890	184		—
1900	268		45.7%
1910	285		6.3%
1920	276		−3.2%
1930	238		−13.8%
1940	233		−2.1%
1950	203		−12.9%
1960	190		−6.4%
1970	160		−15.8%
1980	131		−18.1%
1990	145		10.7%
2000	106		−26.9%
2010	94		−11.3%
2020	82		−12.8%
2021 (est.)	73	▼	−11.0%
U.S. Decennial Census

=== 2010 census ===
As of the census of 2010, there were 94 people, 46 households, and 28 families residing in the village. The population density was 470.0 inhabitants per square mile (181.5/km^{2}). There were 59 housing units at an average density of 295.0 per square mile (113.9/km^{2}). The racial makeup of the village was 95.7% White and 4.3% from two or more races. Hispanic or Latino of any race were 2.1% of the population.

There were 46 households, of which 26.1% had children under the age of 18 living with them, 52.2% were married couples living together, 4.3% had a female householder with no husband present, 4.3% had a male householder with no wife present, and 39.1% were non-families. 34.8% of all households were made up of individuals, and 10.8% had someone living alone who was 65 years of age or older. The average household size was 2.04 and the average family size was 2.57.

The median age in the village was 46 years. 19.1% of residents were under the age of 18; 3.2% were between the ages of 18 and 24; 22.2% were from 25 to 44; 39.4% were from 45 to 64; and 16% were 65 years of age or older. The gender makeup of the village was 51.1% male and 48.9% female.

=== 2000 census ===
As of the census of 2000, there were 106 people, 50 households, and 26 families residing in the village. The population density was 532.1 inhabitants per square mile (205.4/km^{2}). There were 59 housing units at an average density of 296.2 per square mile (114.4/km^{2}). The racial makeup of the village was 100.00% White.

There were 50 households, out of which 18.0% had children under the age of 18 living with them, 44.0% were married couples living together, 4.0% had a female householder with no husband present, and 48.0% were non-families. 44.0% of all households were made up of individuals, and 20.0% had someone living alone who was 65 years of age or older. The average household size was 2.12 and the average family size was 3.00.

In the village, the population was spread out, with 25.5% under the age of 18, 2.8% from 18 to 24, 25.5% from 25 to 44, 27.4% from 45 to 64, and 18.9% who were 65 years of age or older. The median age was 40 years. For every 100 females, there were 100.0 males. For every 100 females age 18 and over, there were 107.9 males.

As of 2000 the median income for a household in the village was $21,875, and the median income for a family was $52,500. Males had a median income of $24,844 versus $19,375 for females. The per capita income for the village was $19,170. There were no families and 14.6% of the population living below the poverty line, including no under eighteens and 22.2% of those over 64.

== Education ==
Swanton is served by Tri County Public Schools, which was established in 1966 as a consolidation of various school districts.

== Notable people ==
- Home of Willard Schmidt, 1936 Olympic Gold Medalist in basketball at Berlin. He was a 1928 graduate of Swanton High.

== See also ==
- List of municipalities in Nebraska
