= Wilber-Clatonia High School =

Secondary school in Madison, Nebraska, United States

Coordinates: 40°28′33″N 96°58′05″W

Location
- Ninth and Franklin Streets; Wilber, (Saline County), Nebraska 68465; United States

Information
- Type: Public high school
- Established: 1970
- Principal: Jeff Ganz
- Staff: 14.16 (FTE)
- Enrollment: 193 (2024-2025)
- Student to teacher ratio: 13.63
- Colors: Kelly green, white and black
- Athletics conference: Southern Nebraska Conference
- Nickname: Wolverines

Wilber Clatonia Public School District is located in Wilber, Nebraska, United States. It was founded in 1970 when Wilber High School and Clatonia High School consolidated, forming the Wilber Clatonia Public School District, which has 530 students (K-12). The high school enrollment is approximately 258 students (grades 7-12).

The Wilber Clatonia Public School District is a consolidated system located in Saline and Gage Counties and covers an area of 155 square miles (400 km^{2}). It has an assessed valuation of $225,842,971 and provides education to 530 students in kindergarten through grade 12. A $6,125,000 bond passage passed in August 2003 provided for the construction of a Pre-kindergarten to 6th-grade classroom facility with a library, computer lab, and gymnasium. The bond issue also provided for a new running track.

== History ==
The first class graduated from Wilber High School in 1886. A new high school building was built around 1910. In 1930 a new high school building was built to the east of the old building, and the old high school was used for elementary classes. When the new school district was formed in 1970, a new high school building was built on South Franklin Street. The older school building to the west was torn down and became a playground area. The 1930 high school then became the elementary school, providing facilities for the students in the city and students now attending in town because many of the rural school districts were closed as part of the consolidation. In 2005 the elementary school was added to the existing high school and the 1930 building was torn down.

== Athletics ==
The school's rival in sports is Tri-County. The school colors are green and white, and the mascot is the wolverine.

Wilber Clatonia won the Class C State Championship in girls' basketball in 1983, finishing 27–0 in the season. The 1997-98 wrestling team finished the dual season comprising a record of 6–0–1, the lone tie coming to Lincoln Christian. In the 2016–17 season, they also won the class C2 football championship.
