= Shestak, Nebraska =

Unincorporated community in Nebraska, U.S.

- Unincorporated community
- Location within Nebraska Location within the United States
- Coordinates: 40°34′05″N 96°57′48″W
- Country: United States
- State: Nebraska
- County: Saline

Shestak is an unincorporated community in Saline County, Nebraska, United States. The community is located on Nebraska Highway 103 three miles (4.8 km) south of Crete. The Big Blue River flows past, approximately one-half mile (0.80 km) to the east of the community.

== History ==
Shestak had a post office from 1893 until 1894. The community was named for Václav Šesták, an early settler and native of Bohemia.
