= Hotel Wilber =

- U.S. National Register of Historic Places
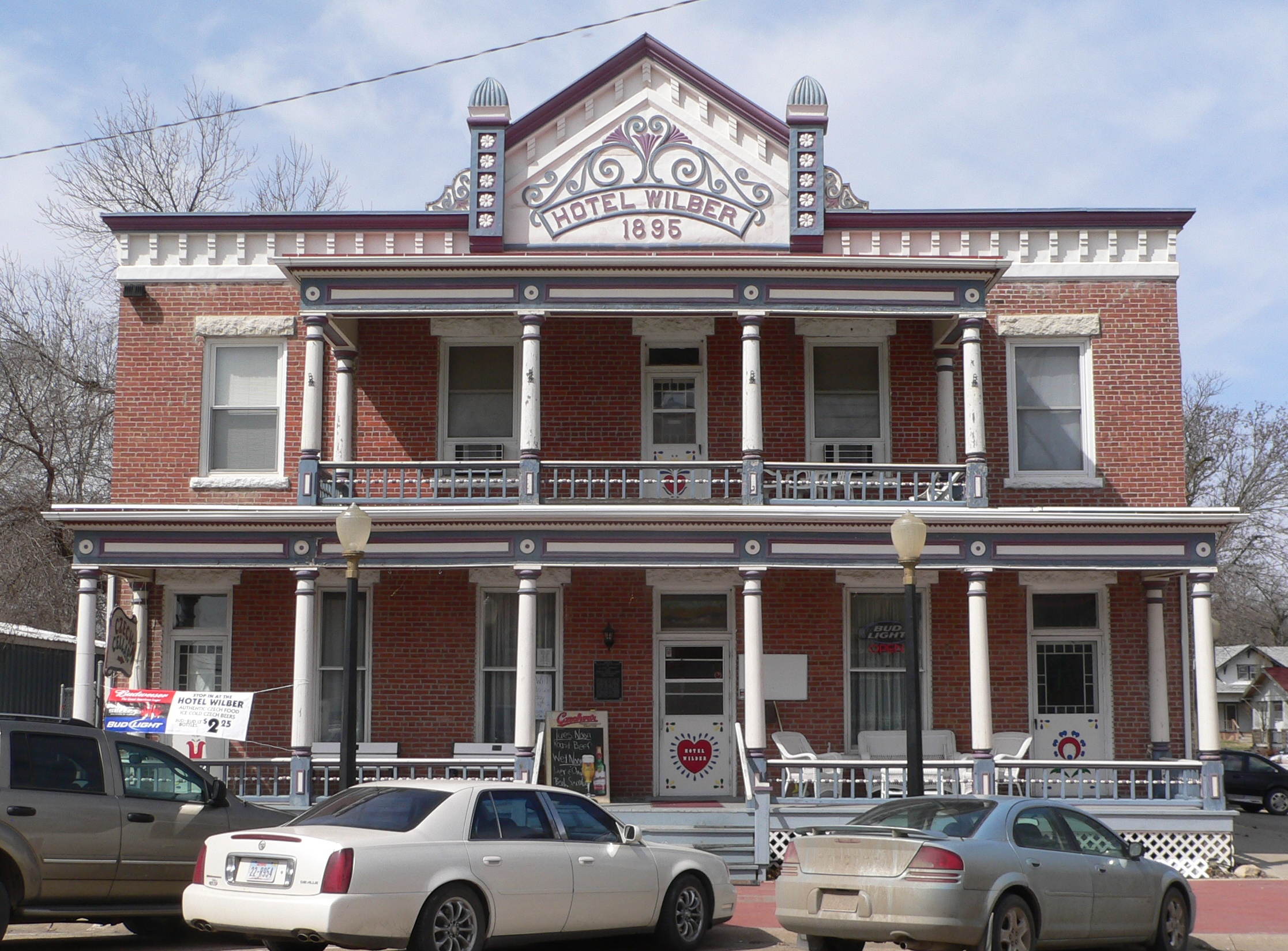
- The hotel in 2010

- Location within Nebraska Location within the United States
- Location: 2nd and Wilson Streets, Wilber, Nebraska
- Coordinates: 40°28′56″N 96°57′42″W
- Area: less than one acre
- Built: 1895
- Built by: Isaac Hickman; Charles Whipple; G. D. Coe; George Smith
- NRHP reference No.: 78001709
- Added to NRHP: September 20, 1978

Hotel Wilber is a historic hotel in Wilber, Nebraska. It was built in 1895 as a hotel and gathering place for social events. The builders were Isaac Hickman, Charles Whipple, G. D. Coe, and George Smith. Cultural historian Janet Jeffries Spencer of the Nebraska State Historical Society and architect D. Murphy add,

Built of standard masonry construction, most of the building displays the stilted segmental arch so common for the period. Window and door openings on the front, however, display rough cut stone lintels and sills. Overall emphasis is placed on the front facade which features a two-story columned portico and the unusually well preserved false, pressed-metal gable. A simple pressed metal, bracketed cornice (which is executed in corbelled brick on the rest of the building) completes the decorative motif.

— Janet Jeffries Spencer and D. Murphy, National Register of Historic Places Inventory--Nomination Form

The building has been listed on the National Register of Historic Places since September 20, 1978.
