= Saline County Courthouse (Nebraska) =

- U.S. National Register of Historic Places
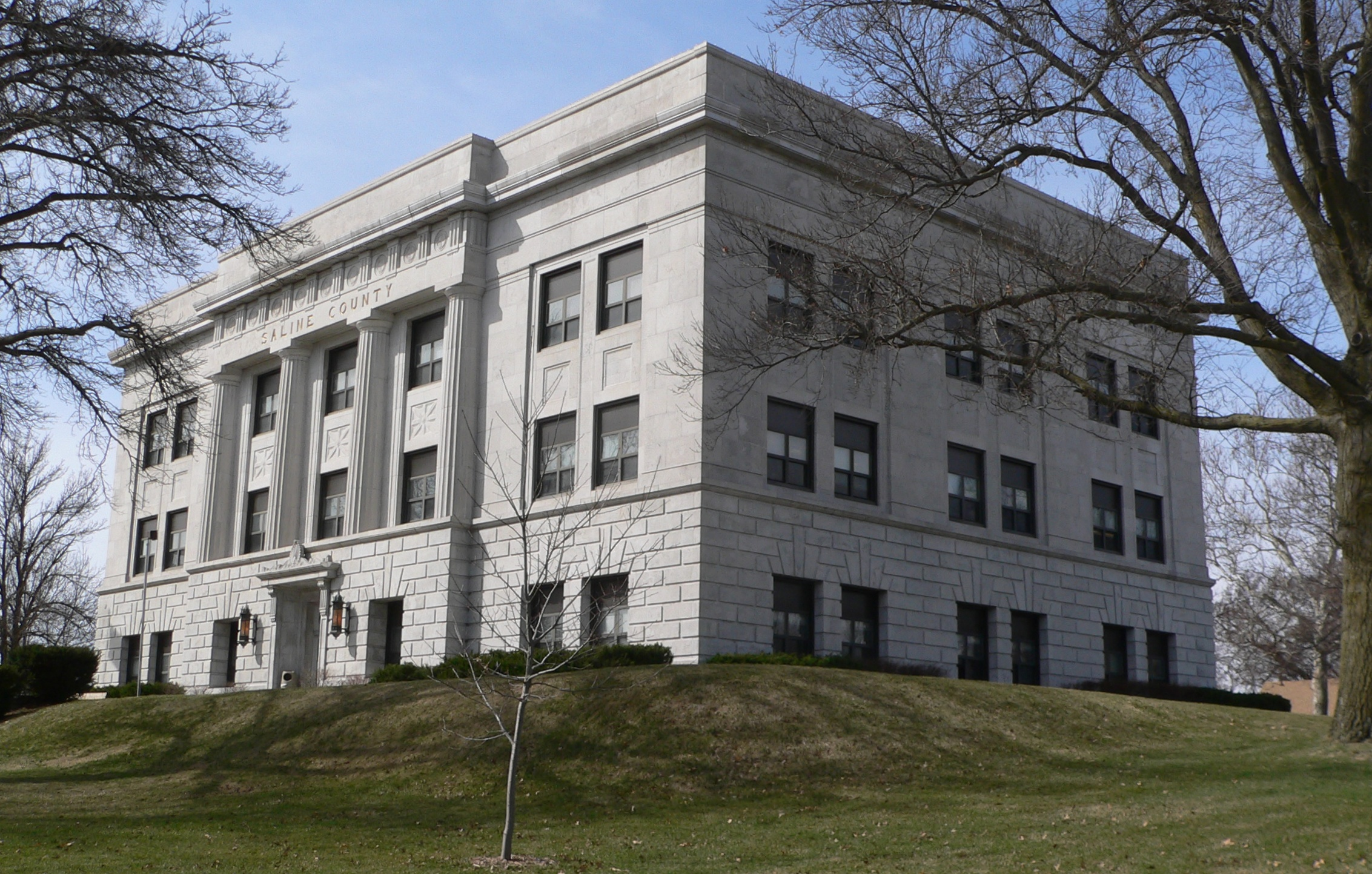
- The building in 2010

- Location within Nebraska Location within the United States
- Location: 215 South Court, Wilber, Nebraska
- Coordinates: 40°28′55″N 96°57′56″W
- Area: 1.5 acres (0.61 ha)
- Built: 1927
- Architect: Marcus L. Evans
- Architectural style: Classical Revival
- MPS: County Courthouses of Nebraska MPS
- NRHP reference No.: 90000967
- Added to NRHP: July 5, 1990

The Saline County Courthouse is a historic three-story building in Wilber, Nebraska, and the courthouse of Saline County, Nebraska. It is the second county courthouse built in Wilber; the first courthouse was built in 1878. The current courthouse was built in 1927, with Bedford limestone. It was designed by architect Marcus L. Evans in the Classical Revival style, with "acroteria, fluted Doric columns, and triglyphs." It has been listed on the National Register of Historic Places since July 5, 1990.
