= Sokol Pavilion =

Historic building in Wilber, Nebraska, US

- U.S. National Register of Historic Places
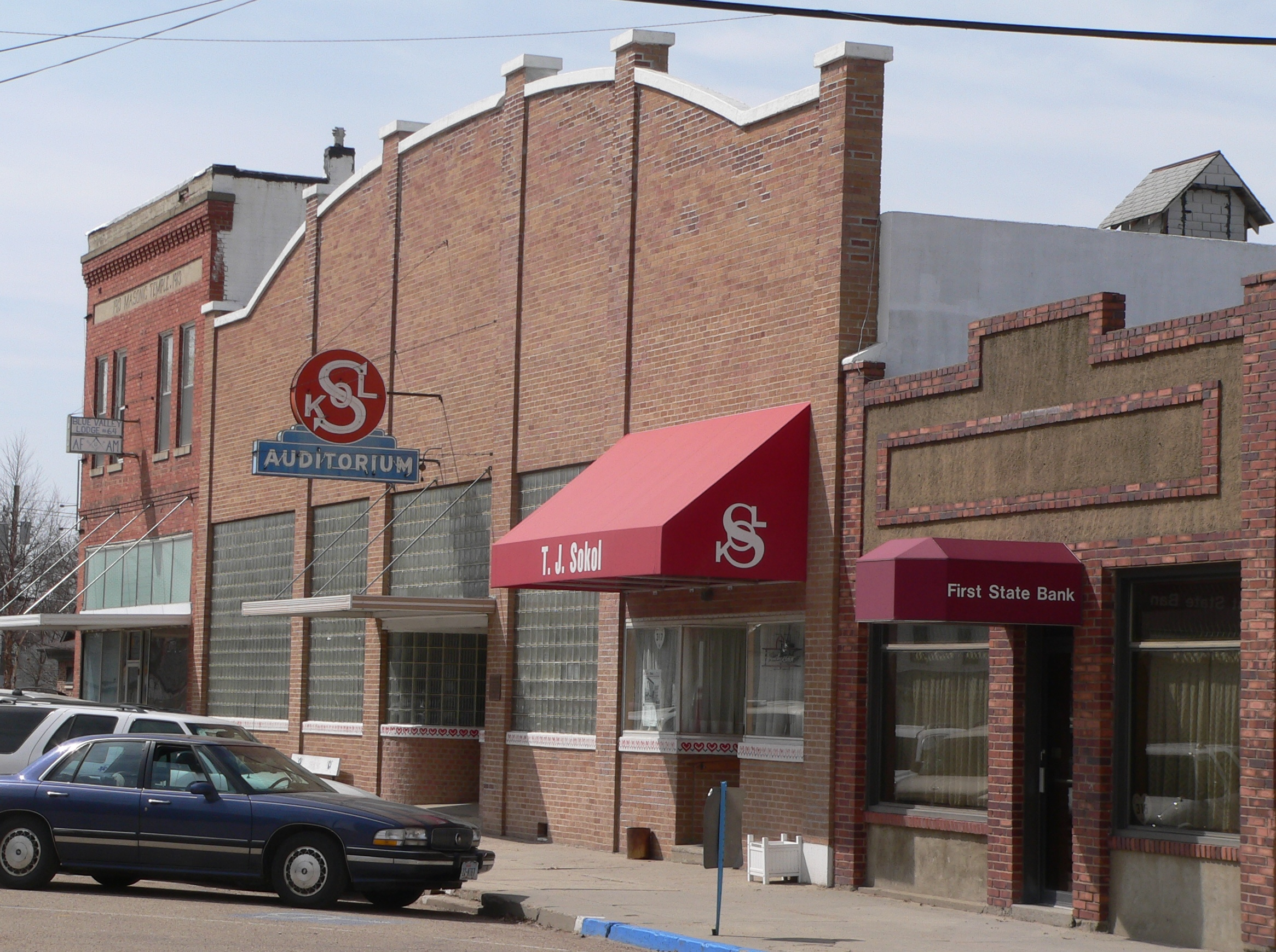

- Location within Nebraska Location within the United States
- Location: 315 S. Wilson St., Wilber, Nebraska
- Coordinates: 40°28′50″N 96°57′27″W
- Built: 1930
- NRHP reference No.: 98000892
- Added to NRHP: July 23, 1998

The Sokol Pavilion, also known as Sokol Auditorium, is a building in Wilber, Nebraska that was built in 1930. It was listed on the National Register of Historic Places on September 14, 1995. The building historically served as a host for Sokol gymnastic events and as a meeting hall for the Czech community.

== See also ==
- Sokol
- Sokol Auditorium
