= Tobias, Nebraska =

Village in Saline County, Nebraska, United States

- Village
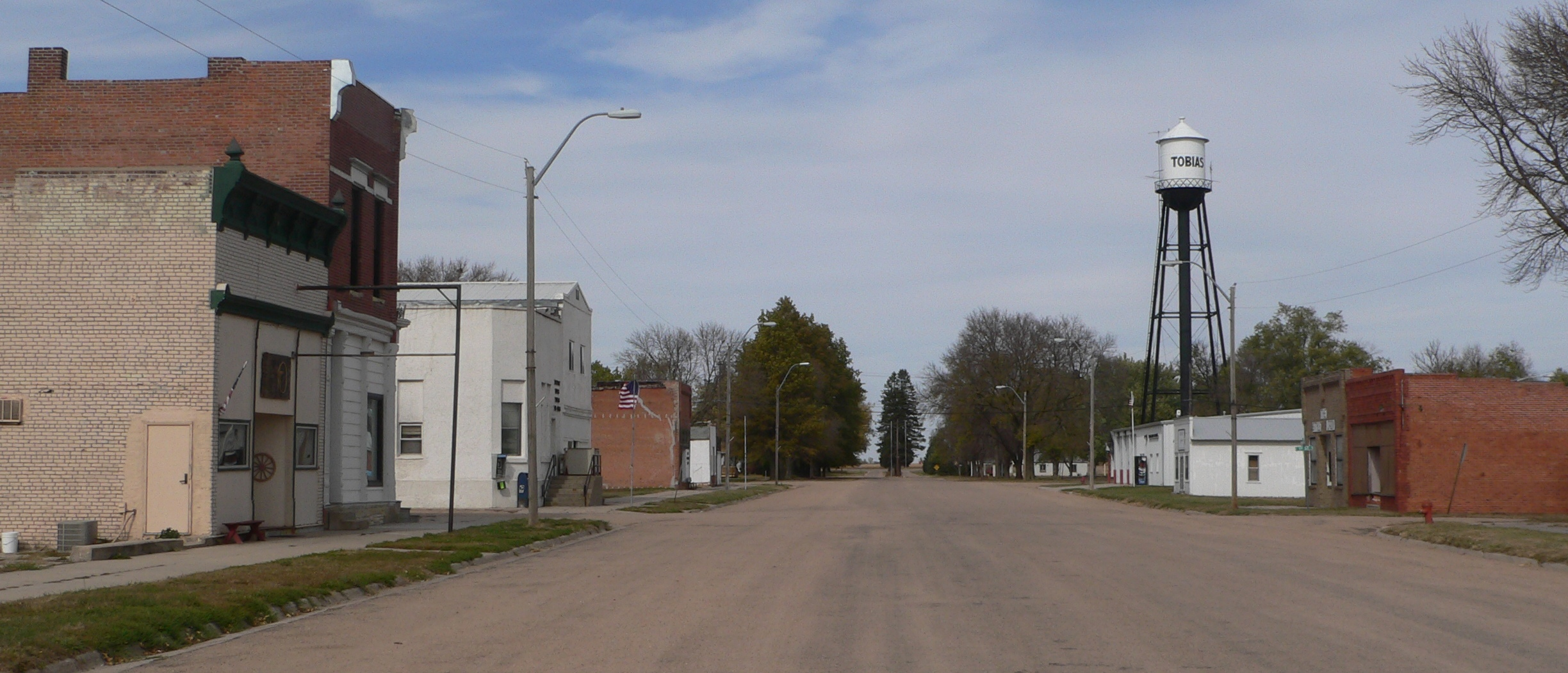
- Downtown Tobias

- Location of Tobias, Nebraska
- Coordinates: 40°25′07″N 97°20′12″W
- Country: United States
- State: Nebraska
- County: Saline

Area
  - Total: 0.26 sq mi (0.68 km^{2})
  - Land: 0.26 sq mi (0.68 km^{2})
  - Water: 0 sq mi (0.00 km^{2})
- Elevation: 1,604 ft (489 m)

Population (2020)
  - Total: 114
  - Estimate (2021): 112
  - Density: 430/sq mi (170/km^{2})
- Time zone: UTC-6 (Central (CST))
  - Summer (DST): UTC-5 (CDT)
- ZIP code: 68453
- Area code: 402
- FIPS code: 31-49005
- GNIS feature ID: 2399990

Tobias is a village in Saline County, Nebraska, United States. As of the 2020 census, Tobias had a population of 114.

== History ==
Tobias was laid out in 1884 when the railroad was extended to the area. It was named for Tobias Castor, a local settler.

== Geography ==
According to the United States Census Bureau, the village has a total area of 0.26 square miles (0.67 km^{2}), all land.

== Demographics ==
Historical population
Census	Pop.	Note	%±
1890	539		—
1900	672		24.7%
1910	445		−33.8%
1920	357		−19.8%
1930	402		12.6%
1940	316		−21.4%
1950	240		−24.1%
1960	202		−15.8%
1970	124		−38.6%
1980	138		11.3%
1990	127		−8.0%
2000	158		24.4%
2010	106		−32.9%
2020	114		7.5%
2021 (est.)	112	▼	−1.8%
U.S. Decennial Census

=== 2010 census ===
As of the census of 2010, there were 106 people, 52 households, and 26 families residing in the village. The population density was 407.7 inhabitants per square mile (157.4/km^{2}). There were 68 housing units at an average density of 261.5 per square mile (101.0/km^{2}). The racial makeup of the village was 96.2% White and 3.8% from other races. Hispanic or Latino of any race were 7.5% of the population.

There were 52 households, of which 23.1% had children under the age of 18 living with them, 40.4% were married couples living together, 3.8% had a female householder with no husband present, 5.8% had a male householder with no wife present, and 50.0% were non-families. 46.2% of all households were made up of individuals, and 32.7% had someone living alone who was 65 years of age or older. The average household size was 2.04 and the average family size was 2.92.

The median age in the village was 48.7 years. 20.8% of residents were under the age of 18; 9.5% were between the ages of 18 and 24; 10.4% were from 25 to 44; 30.2% were from 45 to 64; and 29.2% were 65 years of age or older. The gender makeup of the village was 50.0% male and 50.0% female.

=== 2000 census ===
As of the census of 2000, there were 158 people, 65 households, and 44 families residing in the village. The population density was 604.3 inhabitants per square mile (233.3/km^{2}). There were 77 housing units at an average density of 294.5 per square mile (113.7/km^{2}). The racial makeup of the village was 99.37% White and 0.63% Asian. Hispanic or Latino of any race were 0.63% of the population.

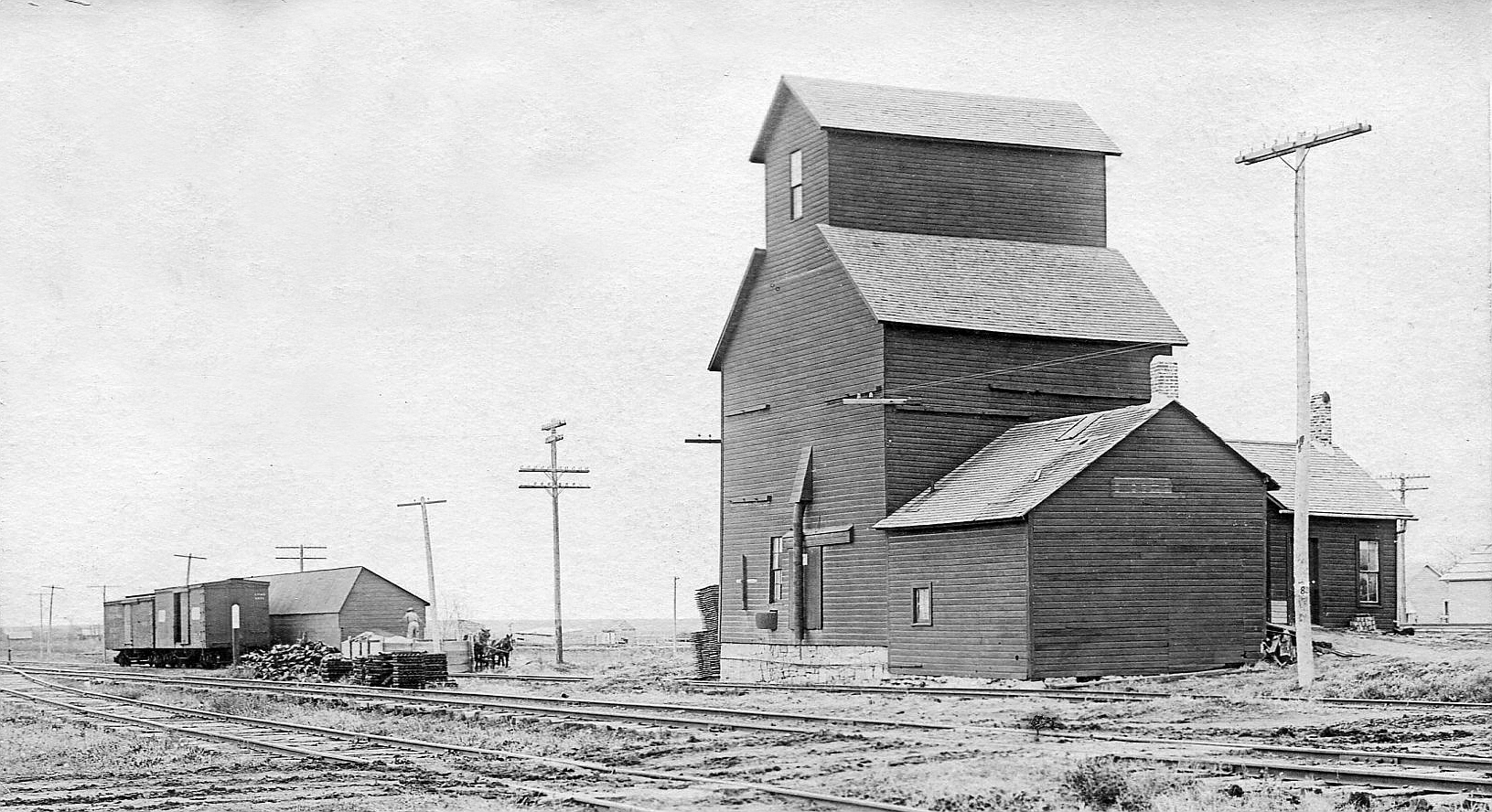
Railroad yard in Tobias, 1913

There were 65 households, out of which 30.8% had children under the age of 18 living with them, 58.5% were married couples living together, 6.2% had a female householder with no husband present, and 32.3% were non-families. 29.2% of all households were made up of individuals, and 10.8% had someone living alone who was 65 years of age or older. The average household size was 2.43 and the average family size was 3.07 capita.

In the village, the population was spread out, with 30.4% under the age of 18, 3.2% from 18 to 24, 21.5% from 25 to 44, 24.7% from 45 to 64, and 20.3% who were 65 years of age or older. The median age was 42 years. For every 100 females, there were 97.5 males. For every 100 females age 18 and over, there were 100.0 males.

As of 2000 the median income for a household in the village was $36,607, and the median income for a family was $43,333. Males had a median income of $26,625 versus $23,333 for females. The per capita income for the village was $13,017. Only about 5.6% of families and 4.3% of the population were below the poverty line, including none of those under the age of eighteen or sixty five or over.

== Education ==
Students from Tobias attend Meridian School.

== See also ==
- List of municipalities in Nebraska
