= Warren's Opera House =

- U.S. National Register of Historic Places
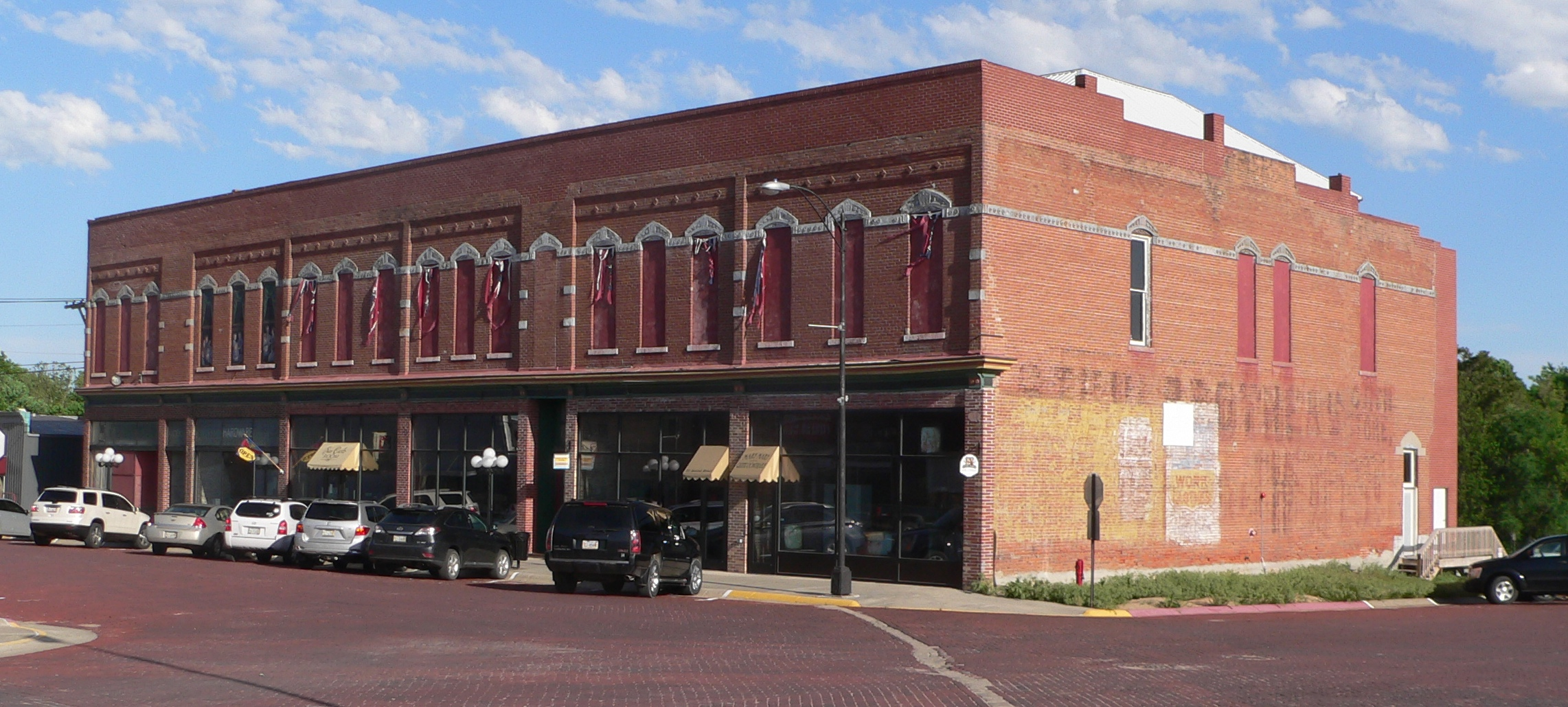
- The building in 2013

- Location within Nebraska Location within the United States
- Location: 511 Second Street, Friend, Nebraska
- Coordinates: 40°39′12″N 97°17′13″W
- Area: less than one acre
- Built: 1885
- Built by: John Lanahan
- Architectural style: Three-part commercial block
- MPS: Opera House Buildings in Nebraska 1867-1917 MPS
- NRHP reference No.: 88000945
- Added to NRHP: September 28, 1988

Warren's Opera House is a historic building in Friend, Nebraska. It was built by John Lanahan for Joshua Warren, a wealthy Canadian grain merchant, in 1885–1886. Inside, there is an auditorium with a proscenium and a balcony supported by four columns. It hosted performances by "touring stock companies; comic opera; companies; musical concerts; dialect comedies" as well as local performers and Memorial Day celebrations. The building has been listed on the National Register of Historic Places since September 28, 1988.
