= Mann-Zwonecek House =

- U.S. National Register of Historic Places
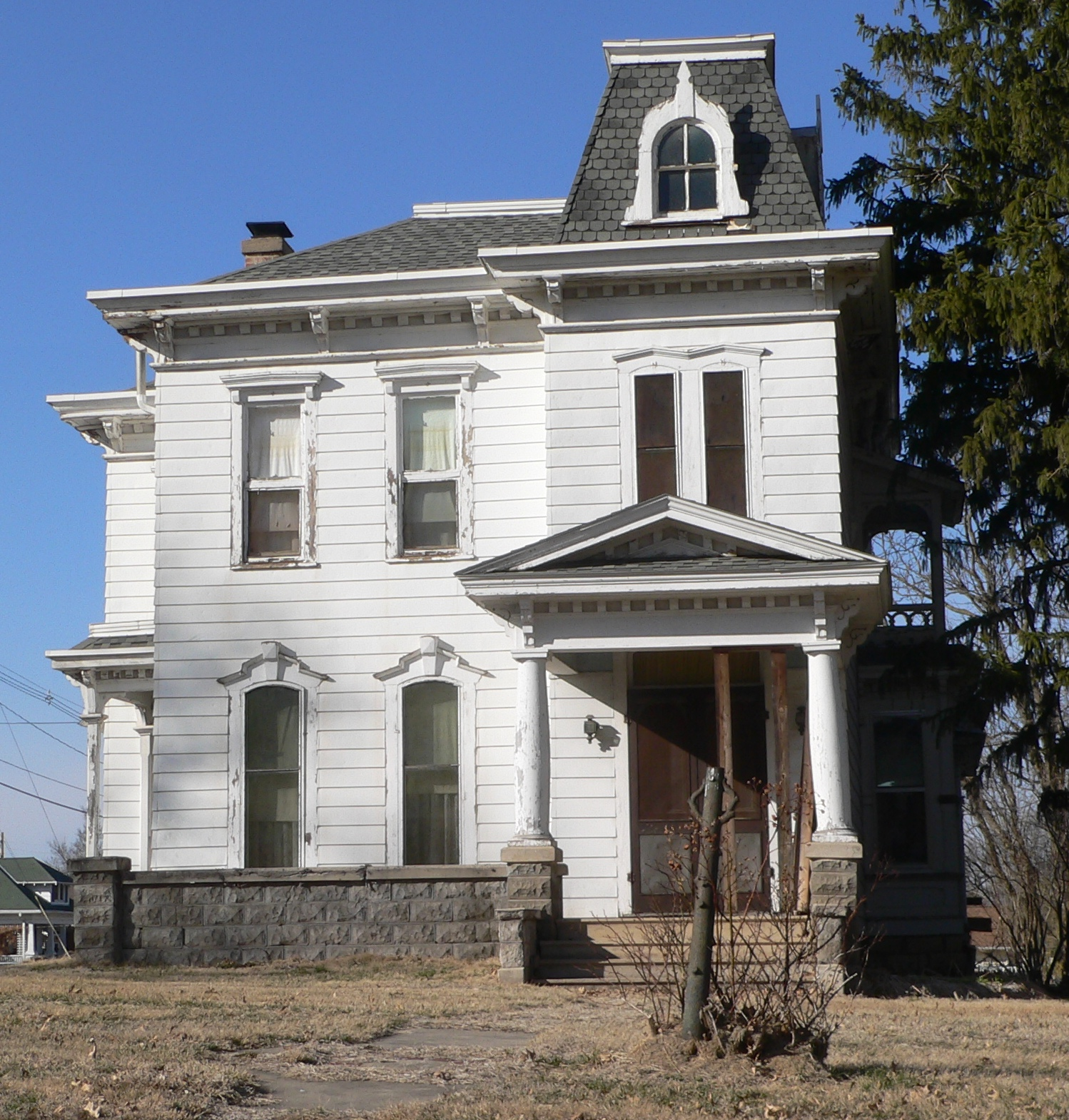
- The house in 2012

- Location within Nebraska Location within the United States
- Location: 524 West 1st Street, Wilber, Nebraska
- Coordinates: 40°29′01″N 96°58′01″W
- Area: 2 acres (0.81 ha)
- Built: 1881
- Architectural style: Italianate, Second Empire
- NRHP reference No.: 78001710
- Added to NRHP: December 29, 1978

The Mann-Zwonecek House is a historic house in Wilber, Nebraska. It was built in 1881 for businessman William H. Mann, and designed in the Italianate and Second Empire architectural styles. The Zwonecek family owned the house from 1894 to 1968, preserving its historic character for over seven decades. By the 1970s, it was "the only extant home of imposing grandeur in Wilber dating to the early 1880s." Recognizing its historical significance, the house was added to the National Register of Historic Places on December 29, 1978.
