= Rad Saline Center cis. 389 Z.C.B.J. =

- U.S. National Register of Historic Places
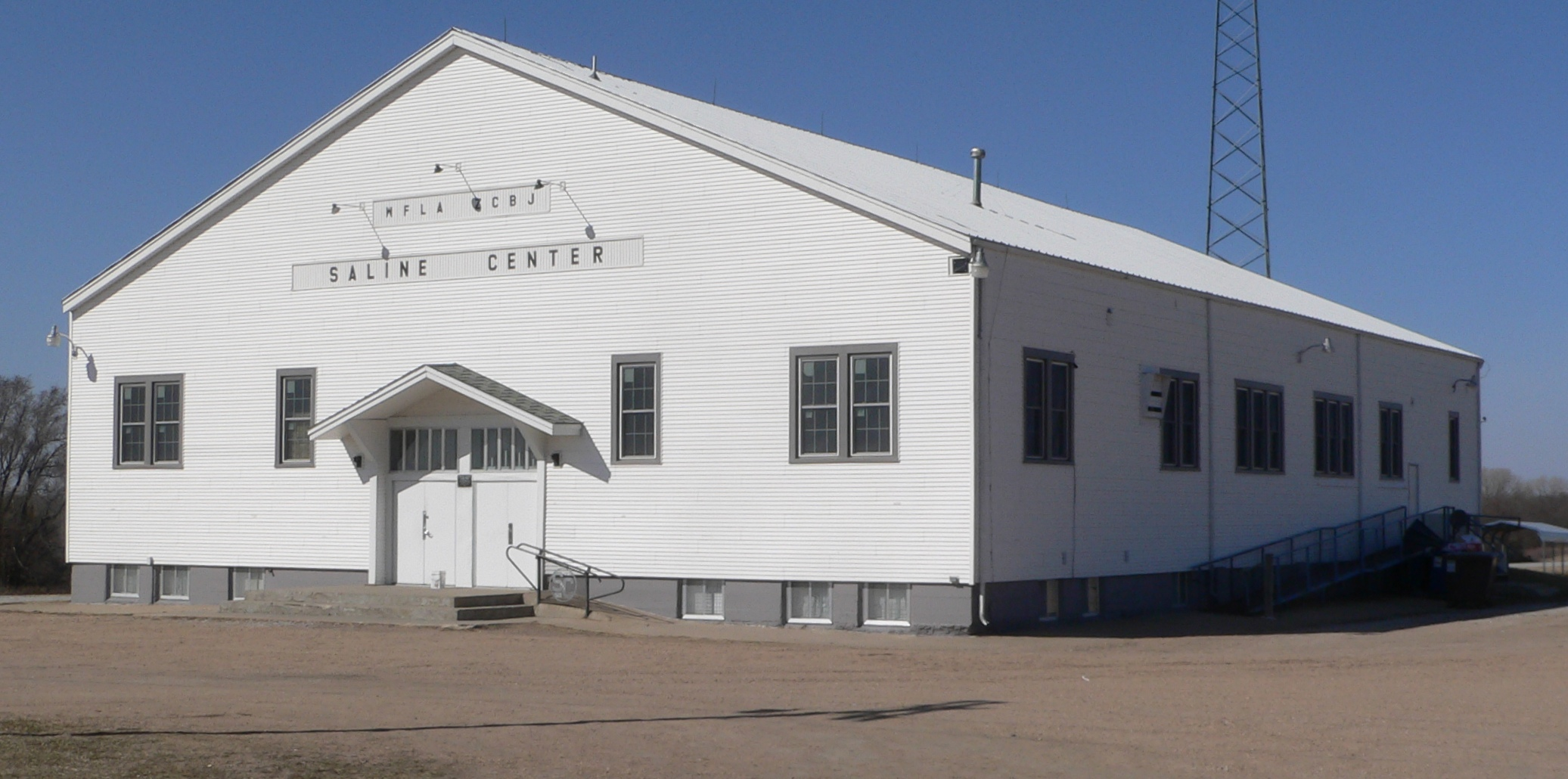
- View from the southeast

- Location within Nebraska Location within the United States
- Location: 2202 M, about 9 miles north of Western, Nebraska
- Coordinates: 40°31′28.7″N 97°10′43″W
- Area: 3 acres (1.2 ha)
- Built: 1939
- NRHP reference No.: 95001483
- Added to NRHP: January 4, 1996

The Rad Saline Center cis. 389 Z.C.B.J., also known as Saline Center Lodge Hall, is an historic building in rural Nebraska located about 9 miles north of Western, Nebraska that was built in 1939. It was listed on the National Register of Historic Places on January 4, 1996. It historically served as a meeting hall for the Czech community.

== See also ==
- Zapadni Ceska Bratrska Jednota
- Czech-Slovak Protective Society
