= James Johnston House =

James Johnston House may refer to:

- James Johnston House (Half Moon Bay, California), listed on the National Register of Historic Places in San Mateo County, California
- James Johnston House (Brentwood, Tennessee), NRHP-listed

== See also ==
- Johnston House (disambiguation)
