= Frank J. Rademacher House =

- U.S. National Register of Historic Places
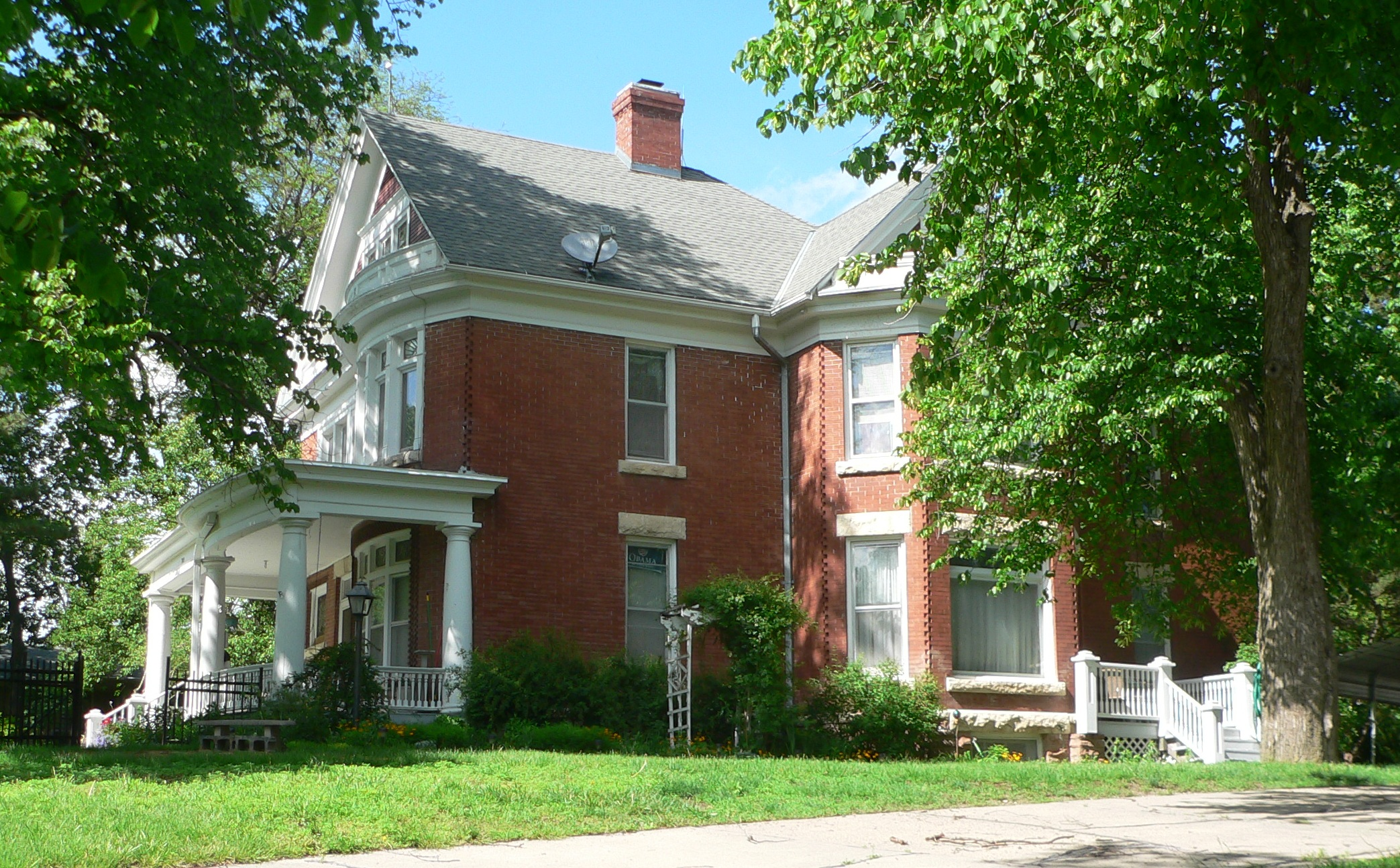
- The house in 2013

- Location within Nebraska Location within the United States
- Location: 1424 Grove Street, Crete, Nebraska
- Coordinates: 40°37′34″N 96°57′14″W
- Area: less than one acre
- Built: 1894
- Architect: James Tyler
- Architectural style: Queen Anne
- NRHP reference No.: 80002460
- Added to NRHP: March 11, 1980

The Frank J. Rademacher House is a historic house in Crete, Nebraska. It was built in 1894 by Frank Joseph Rademacher, a German immigrant, and his wife, Mary Pavlik, an immigrant from Bohemia (now the Czech Republic). Rademacher sold furniture and carpets, and he was the vice president of the Crete Loan and Savings Company. The house was designed in the Queen Anne architectural style. It has been listed on the National Register of Historic Places since March 11, 1980.
