= Telocvicna Jednota Sokol Hall =

- Telocvicna Jednota Sokol
- U.S. National Register of Historic Places
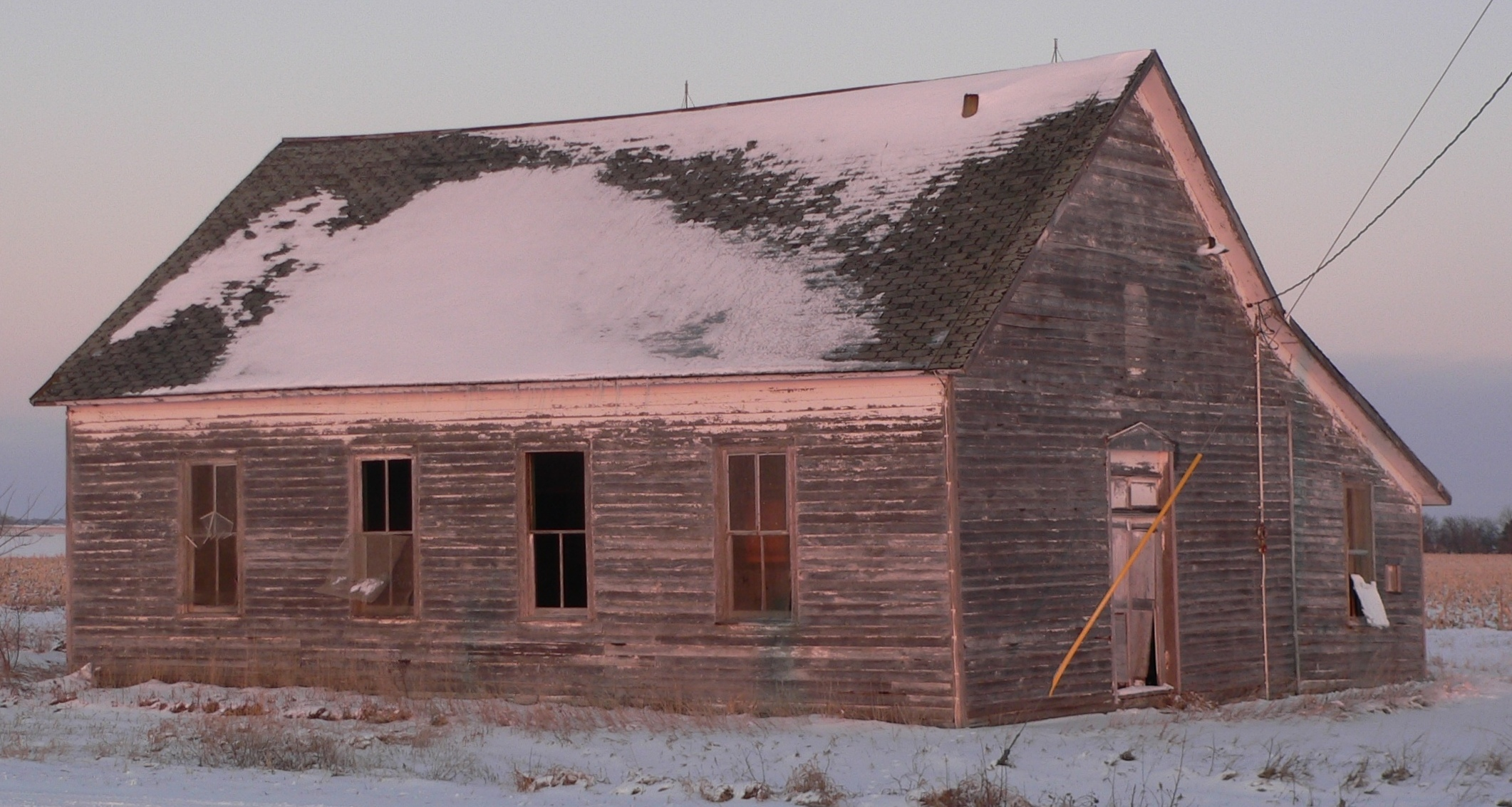
- Brush Creek Hall in 2011

- Location within Nebraska Location within the United States
- Location: SW of Wilber, Nebraska
- Coordinates: 40°27′58″N 97°2′46″W
- Area: 1 acre (0.40 ha)
- Built: 1888
- NRHP reference No.: 85000110
- Added to NRHP: January 18, 1985

The Telocvicna Jednota Sokol hall, also known as Brush Creek Hall , is a building located southwest of Wilber in rural Saline County, Nebraska. The building was constructed in 1888. Historically, it served as a host for Sokol gymnastic events and as a meeting hall for the Czech community. It subsequently hosted meetings of other organizations, such as 4-H, and served as an election hall for its precinct. In 1985, it was listed in the National Register of Historic Places.
