= Meridian High School (Daykin, Nebraska) =

Meridian Public School

Location
- 72380 560th Ave. Daykin, Nebraska 68338; United States; 40°19′12″N 97°19′48″W

Information
- Type: Public high school
- Superintendent: Alex Hull
- Principal: Tara Miller
- Teaching staff: 12.24 (FTE)
- Grades: Pre K- 12th Grade
- Student to teacher ratio: 8.33
- Colors: Red, White, Black
- Fight song: Hail to the Varsity
- Mascot: Mustangs
- Website: www.meridianmustangs.org

Meridian High School is a high school located one mile west of Daykin, Nebraska, United States. It is a consolidated school with kindergarten through twelfth grade, serving the nearby towns of Daykin, Tobias, Western, Fairbury, Nebraska and Alexandria.

== About ==
Along with the high school for the Meridian Public School District, the Meridian building includes an elementary and middle school. The Meridian building was completed in the winter of 1976–77, with classes starting there in the spring of 1977. Before the school building was built, the towns of Daykin, Tobias, and Alexandria had already combined their schools for nearly 20 years in Meridian. In that scheme the town of Daykin provided a building for students in elementary school, Alexandria a middle school, and Tobias a high school.

At the time of consolidation Meridian was a class C-2 Nebraska school. It is now a class D-1 school.

== Extracurricular activities ==
Meridian has several sports teams. Female students compete in volleyball, basketball, and track. They are also allowed to participate in wrestling; however, to date, there have been no female wrestlers. Male students compete in football, basketball, wrestling and track. Students play baseball and softball in the summer. The teams are not formally a part of the school although the teams play under the name Meridian in the SFS Baseball League, Fun4All Softball league, and American Legion Baseball.

Students also have the options of participating in a variety of extracurricular activities, including student council, Future Business Leaders of America, drama, International Thespian Society, yearbook staff, Enrichment, National Honor Society, Quiz Bowl, show choir, band and pep band, cheer leading, and competitive speech.
