= Darius David Johnston House =

Historic house and museum in California, U.S.

- U.S. National Register of Historic Places
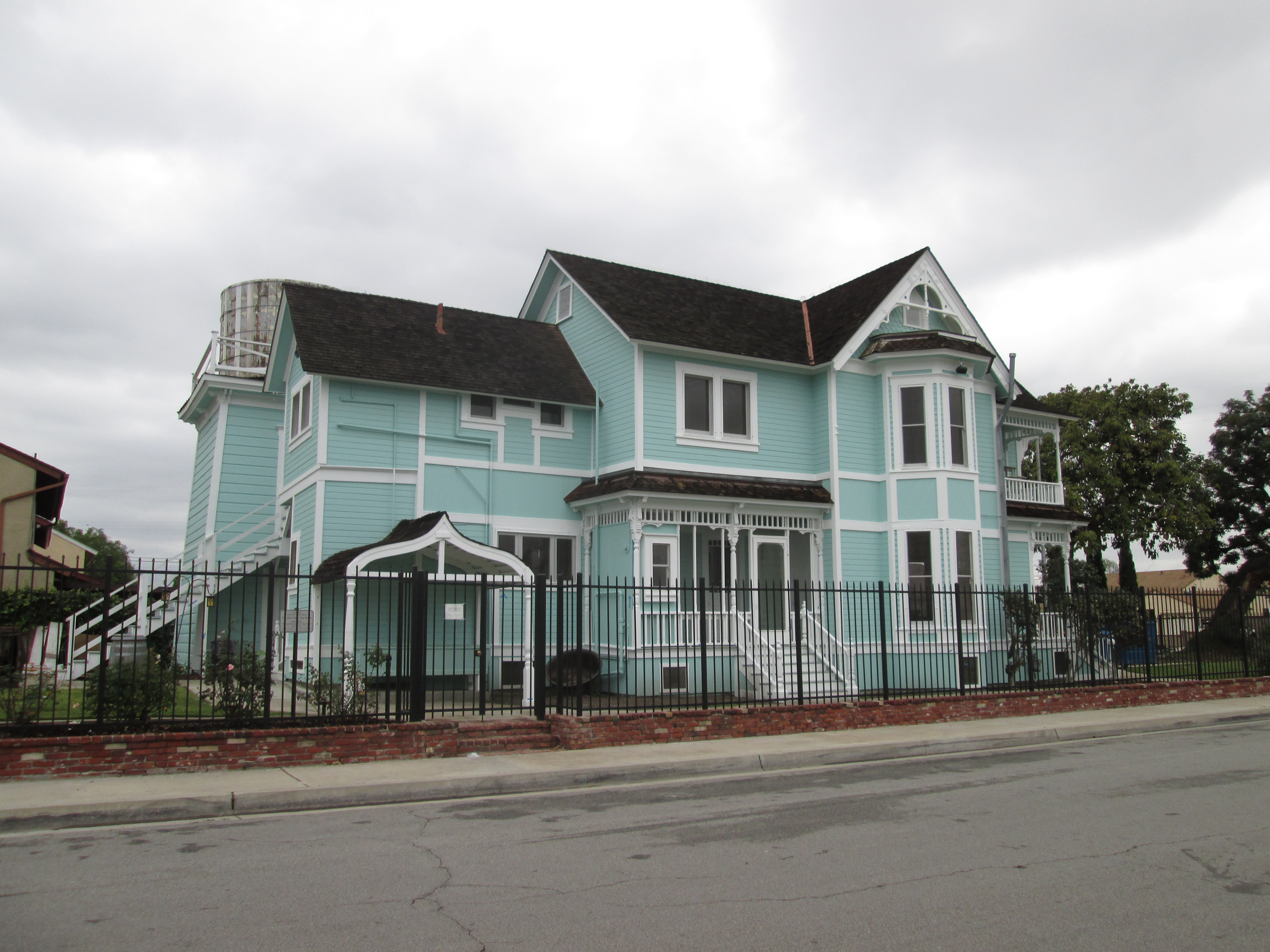
- The house in 2016

- Location within the Los Angeles metropolitan area Location within California Location within the United States
- Location: 12426 Mapledale St, Norwalk CA 90650
- Coordinates: 33.8990°N 118.0679°W
- Area: 10,001 sq ft (929.1 m^{2})
- Built: 1890-91
- Architect: Darius David Johnston
- Architectural style: Stick/Eastlake
- NRHP reference No.: 78000693
- Added to NRHP: November 2, 1978

The Darius David Johnston House, is a historic house and museum in Norwalk, California. Constructed from 1890 to 1891, it is a two-story building in the Stick and Eastlake styles. It is sometimes called the Hargitt Ranch House for the constructor, Darius David Johnston's daughter, Cora Hargitt. The building was added to the National Register of Historic Places on November 2, 1978.

== Description ==
The house, made of redwood, has a gable roof, in which the front and side bay gables are decorated with scrolls. The exterior has not been altered much from its original state, but only one stained glass window remains, on the front door. A water tower built in 1878, originally for an earlier house, is attached to the side, containing its original pipes. The stairs found at the side of the building the tower is housed in were added in 1930. The house cost $2,800 to build.

== History ==
The house was originally home to Darius Davis Johnston, one of the founders of the Norwalk School District (now the Norwalk–La Mirada Unified School District) and a member of the board of directors there until his death in 1917. One of the district's elementary schools was named after him. The property initially consisted of 120 acres (49 ha) of land, where the owners grew prunes, avocados, and citrus during Prohibition. The extra land has now been sold to be used for residences.

== Museum ==
Tours of the house are conducted on the first and third Saturdays of each month. It contains Johnston family heirlooms and memorabilia from the city's past.
