= Frank Pisar Farmstead =

- U.S. National Register of Historic Places
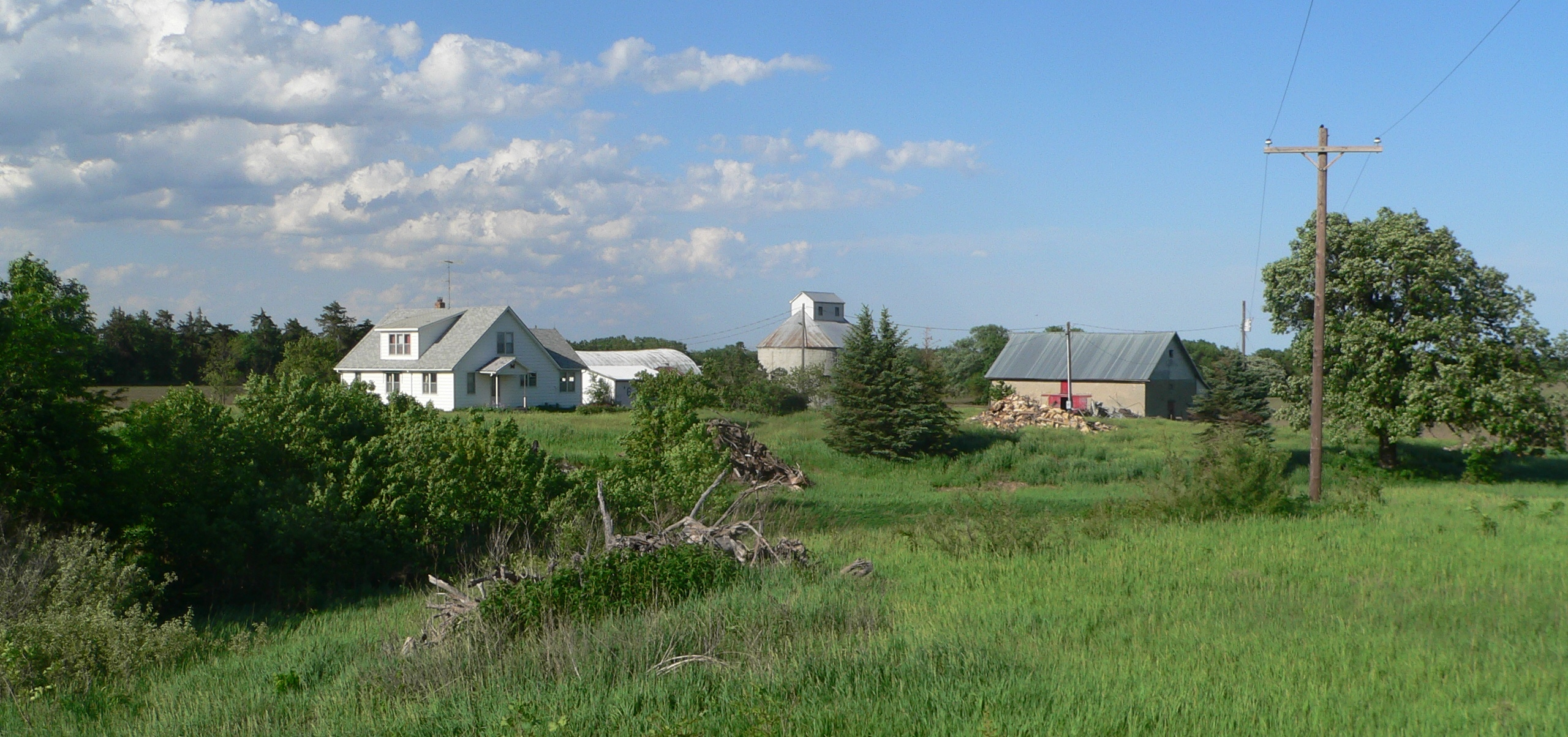
- View from the southwest
- Location: Address Restricted
- Nearest city: Dorchester, Nebraska
- Area: Over 300 acres (120 ha)
- Built: 1872
- Architect: Pisar, Frank
- NRHP reference No.: 86002275
- Added to NRHP: August 6, 1986

The Frank Pisar Farmstead, also known as Joseph Kastanek Farm, is a house and a group of farm buildings in Dorchester, Nebraska, United States. The property was filed in 1872 by Frantisek "Frank" Pisar, an immigrant from Bohemia. The farmstead was originally an 80-acre (32 ha) tract but was expanded in size to over 300 acres (120 ha) by 1885. A stone house was built in 1977, and a stone barn in 1888. The property also includes poultry sheds, a hog house, a corncrib, and a privy. It was listed on the National Register of Historic Places on August 6, 1986.
