= Richard R. Kiddle House =

- U.S. National Register of Historic Places
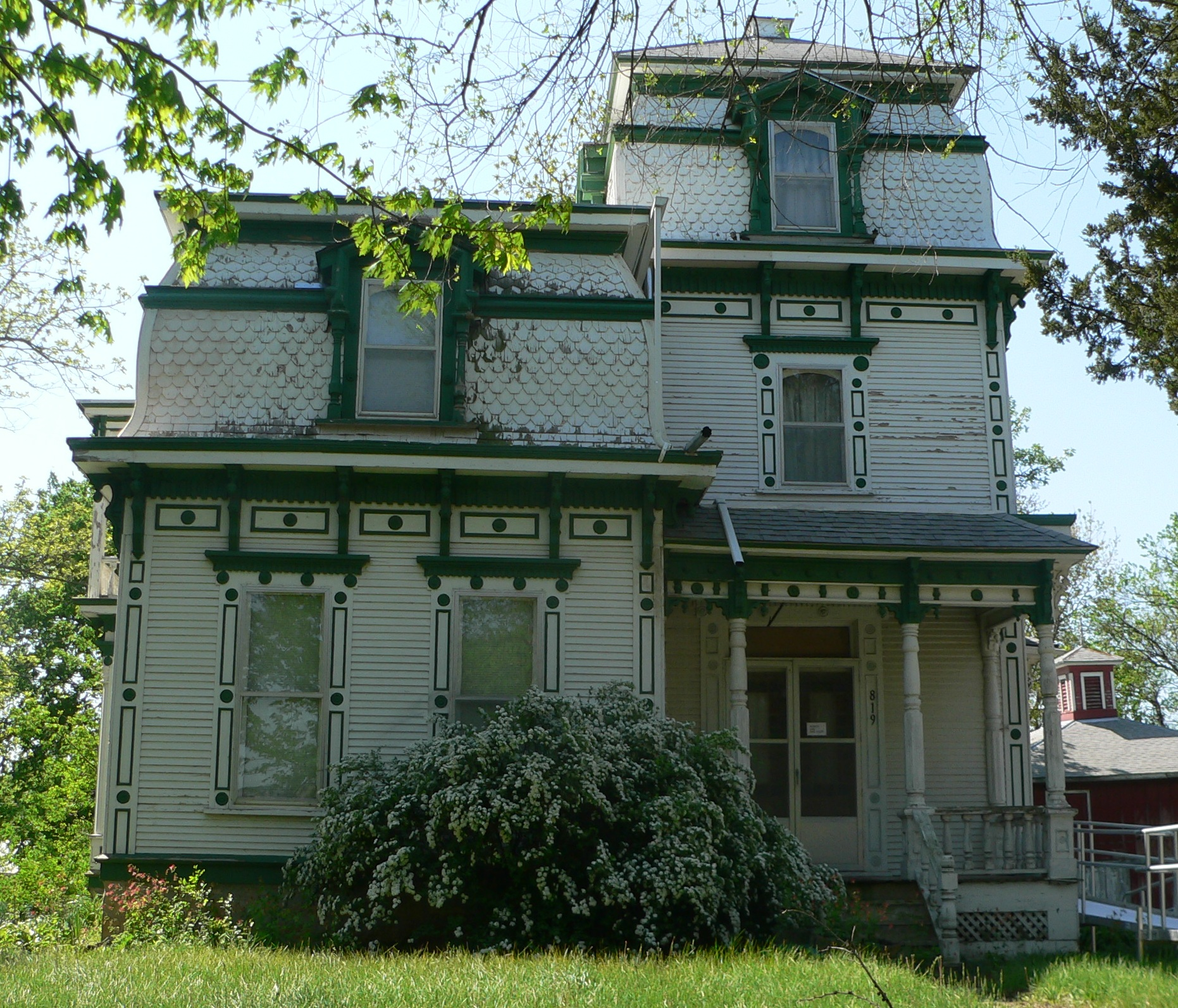
- The house in 2012

- Location within Nebraska Location within the United States
- Location: 819 8th Street, Friend, Nebraska
- Coordinates: 40°38′51″N 97°16′57″W
- Area: less than one acre
- Built: 1886
- Built by: Richard R. Kiddle
- Architectural style: Second Empire
- NRHP reference No.: 85002143
- Added to NRHP: September 12, 1985

Richard R. Kiddle House is a historic house in Friend, Nebraska. It was built in 1886 by carpenter Richard R. Kiddle, and designed in the Second Empire architectural style.

The house has been listed on the National Register of Historic Places since September 12, 1985.
