= Pleasant Hill, Nebraska =

Unincorporated community in Saline County, Nebraska, United States

- Unincorporated community
- Location within Nebraska Location within the United States
- Coordinates: 40°35′12″N 97°04′54″W
- Country: United States
- State: Nebraska
- County: Saline

Pleasant Hill was an unincorporated community in Saline County, Nebraska, United States. The community was southwest of Crete and lay between Turkey Creek to the north and Spring Creek to the south. From 1871 to 1878 Pleasant Hill was the Saline County seat. Its peak population was 246 in 1900.

== History ==
Pleasant Hill had a post office from 1869 until 1912. It was named from its setting.

== Demise ==
Fires, loss of the county seat to Wilber, and the lack of a railroad led to the town’s decline. After the gristmill burned in 1930, Pleasant Hill faded away.

== See also ==
- List of ghost towns in Nebraska
