= Johnston Hall =

Johnston Hall may refer to:

in Canada

- Johnston Hall (University of Guelph), a historical residence building at the University of Guelph, Ontario

in the United States

- Johnston Hall-Seabury Divinity School, Faribault, Minnesota, listed on the National Register of Historic Places (NRHP)
- Johnston Hall (University of Missouri), a historic University of Missouri dormitory
- Johnston Hall (Elon College, North Carolina), listed on the NRHP
- Johnston Hall (Milwaukee, Wisconsin), listed on the NRHP
- Johnston Hall (Moravian College), Bethlehem, Pennsylvania
