= Tri County Public Schools =

School district in Nebraska, United States

Tri County Public Schools is a school district headquartered in unincorporated Jefferson County, Nebraska, south of DeWitt. The district facilities are 2 miles (3.2 km) north of the junction of Nebraska Highway 4 and Nebraska Highway 103. The district serves DeWitt, Plymouth, and Swanton, as well as other unincorporated areas in Jefferson, Saline, and Gage counties. The district has a total area of 270 square miles (700 km^{2}) of area. The district operates Tri County Elementary School and Tri County Jr/Sr High School.

As of 2017 the district has 402 students and 73 employees.

== History ==
The district formed in 1966 as a consolidation of various school districts.
