= Johnston-Muff House =

- U.S. National Register of Historic Places
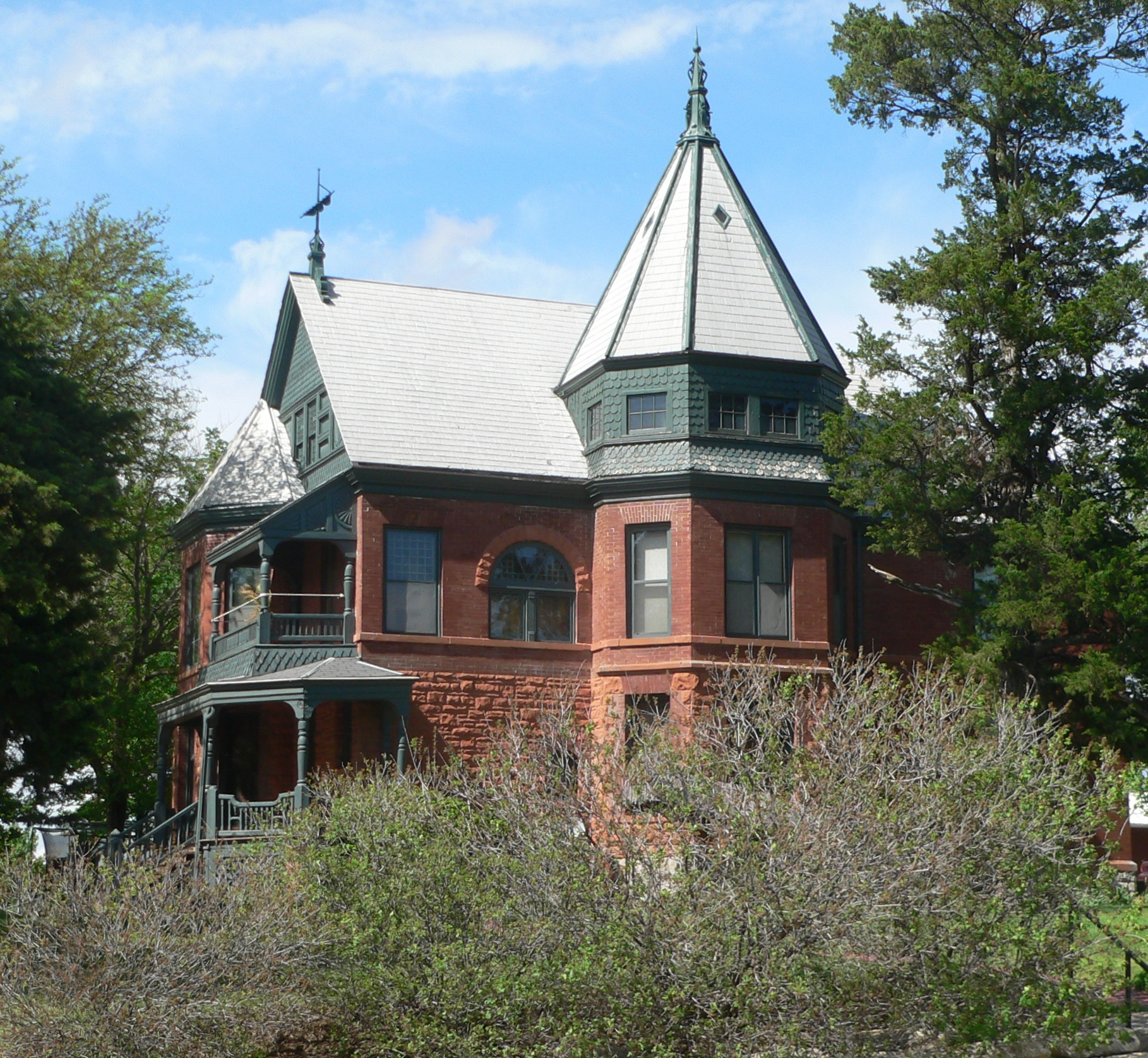
- The house in 2013

- Location within Nebraska Location within the United States
- Location: 1422 Boswell Avenue, Crete, Nebraska
- Coordinates: 40°37′36″N 96°57′04″W
- Area: less than one acre
- Built: 1885
- Architect: James Tyler
- Architectural style: Queen Anne
- NRHP reference No.: 77000837
- Added to NRHP: September 19, 1977

The Johnston-Muff House, also known as the Charles Algermissen House, is a historic house in Crete, Nebraska. It was built in 1885 for John R. Johnston, an immigrant from Canada and homesteader who "built several commercial buildings for rental purposes" in Crete. In 1892, it was acquired by Catherine Hier Muff, an immigrant from Prussia and recent widow of John Muff, an immigrant from Switzerland. The house was designed in the Queen Anne architectural style. It has been listed on the National Register of Historic Places since September 19, 1977.
