= Telocvicna Jednota "T.J." Sokol Hall =

- U.S. National Register of Historic Places
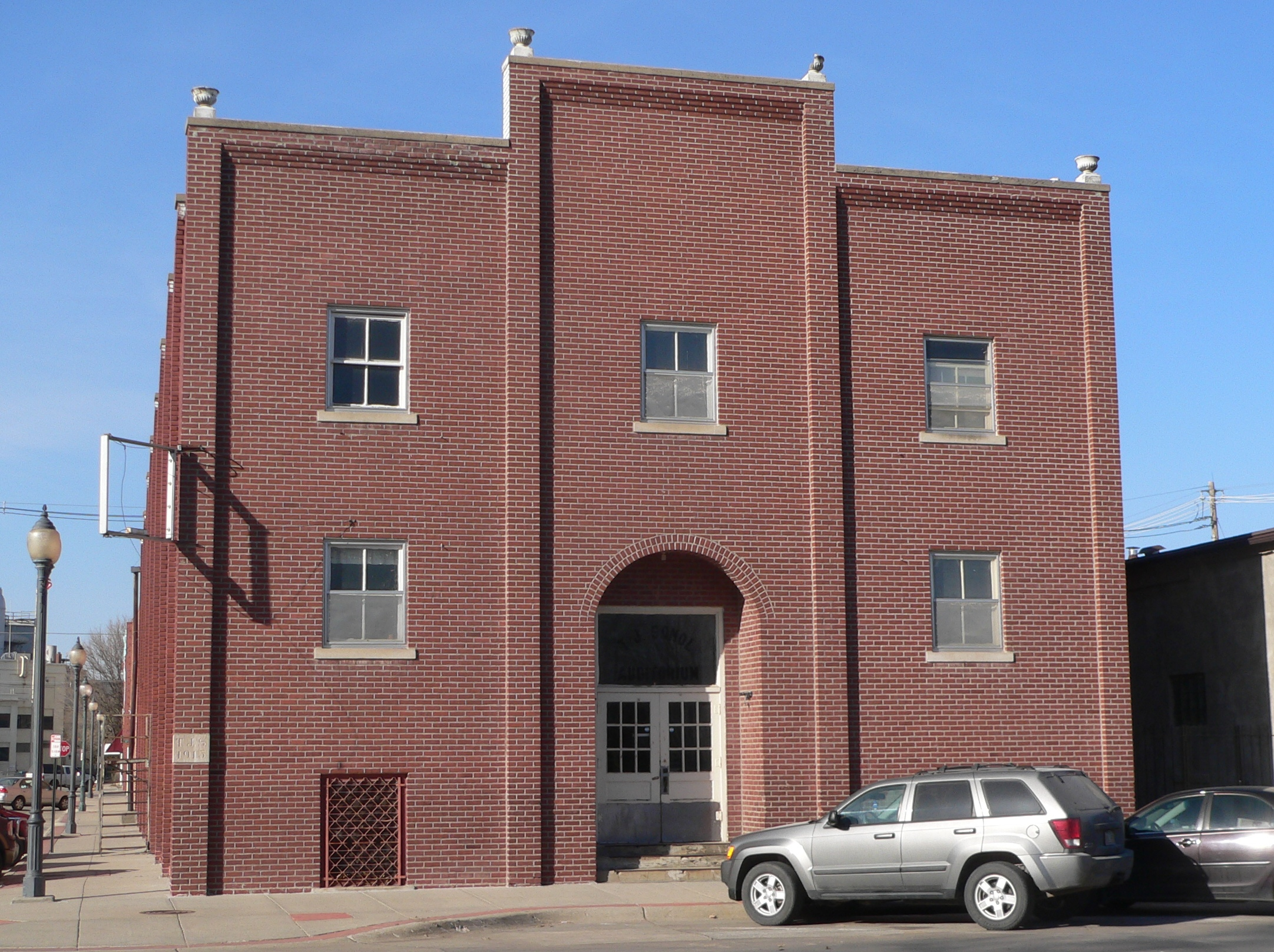
- Main entrance, facing 12th Street

- Location within Nebraska Location within the United States
- Location: 12th St. and Norman Ave., Crete, Nebraska
- Coordinates: 40°37′28.3″N 96°57′45″W
- Built: 1915
- Architect: Anton Daniel and Sons
- NRHP reference No.: 03001214
- Added to NRHP: November 26, 2003

The Telocvicna Jednota "T.J." Sokol Hall, also known as Crete Sokol Hall or SA01-176, is an historic building located in Crete, Nebraska that was built in 1915. It was listed on the National Register of Historic Places on November 26, 2003. The building historically served as a host for Sokol gymnastic events and as a meeting hall for the Czech community.
