= Western, Nebraska =

- Village
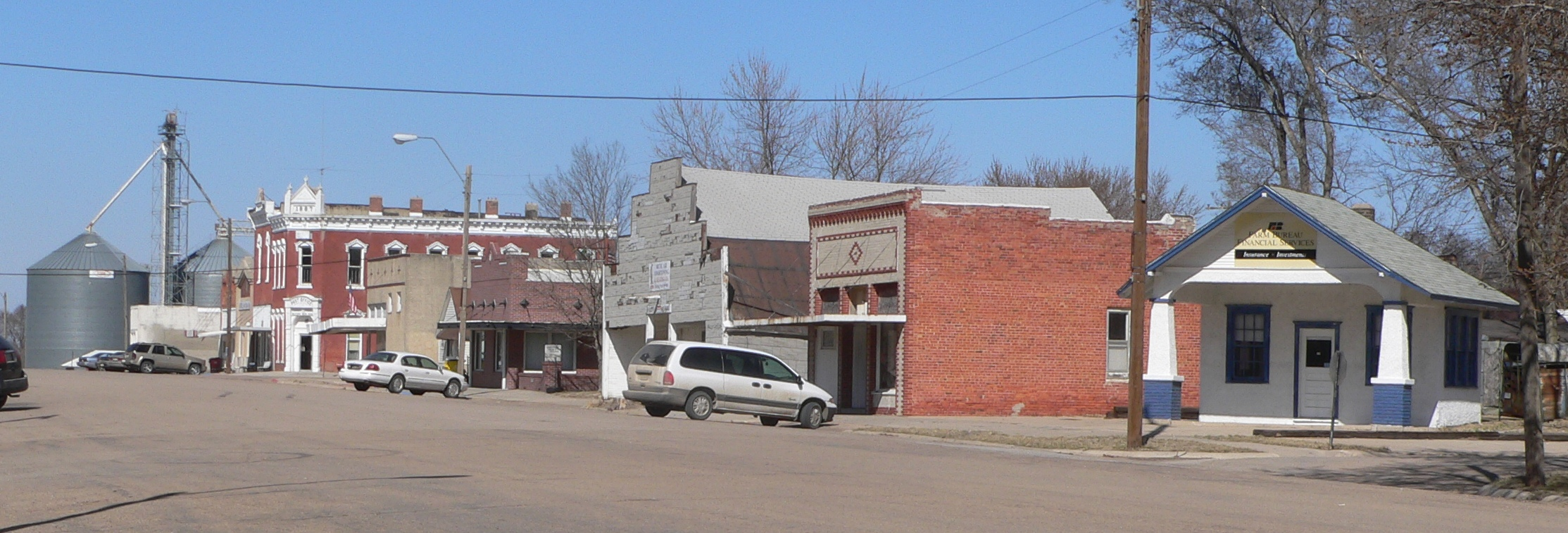
- Downtown Western: east side of West Avenue

- Location of Western, Nebraska
- Coordinates: 40°23′35″N 97°11′54″W
- Country: United States
- State: Nebraska
- County: Saline

Area
  - Total: 0.49 sq mi (1.26 km^{2})
  - Land: 0.49 sq mi (1.26 km^{2})
  - Water: 0 sq mi (0.00 km^{2})
- Elevation: 1,493 ft (455 m)

Population (2020)
  - Total: 224
  - Estimate (2021): 220
  - Density: 460/sq mi (178/km^{2})
- Time zone: UTC-6 (Central (CST))
  - Summer (DST): UTC-5 (CDT)
- ZIP code: 68464
- Area code: 402
- FIPS code: 31-52295
- GNIS feature ID: 2400149

Western is a village in Saline County, Nebraska, United States. The population was 224 at the 2020 census.

== History ==
Western was laid out in 1872. It was likely named for Wesley West, a pioneer settler. Western was incorporated as a village in 1880.

== Geography ==
Western is located at 40°23′31″N 97°11′54″W (40.392050, -97.198259).

According to the United States Census Bureau, the village has a total area of 0.49 square miles (1.27 km^{2}), all land.

== Demographics ==
Historical population
Census	Pop.	Note	%±
1890	397		—
1900	412		3.8%
1910	499		21.1%
1920	427		−14.4%
1930	511		19.7%
1940	437		−14.5%
1950	434		−0.7%
1960	351		−19.1%
1970	344		−2.0%
1980	336		−2.3%
1990	264		−21.4%
2000	287		8.7%
2010	235		−18.1%
2020	227		−3.4%
2021 (est.)	220	▼	−3.1%
U.S. Decennial Census

=== 2010 census ===
As of the census of 2010, there were 235 people, 111 households, and 69 families residing in the village. The population density was 479.6 inhabitants per square mile (185.2/km^{2}). There were 140 housing units at an average density of 285.7 per square mile (110.3/km^{2}). The racial makeup of the village was 94.9% White, 1.3% Asian, and 3.8% from other races. Hispanic or Latino of any race were 4.7% of the population.

There were 111 households, of which 20.7% had children under the age of 18 living with them, 53.2% were married couples living together, 6.3% had a female householder with no husband present, 2.7% had a male householder with no wife present, and 37.8% were non-families. 32.4% of all households were made up of individuals, and 13.5% had someone living alone who was 65 years of age or older. The average household size was 2.12 and the average family size was 2.68.

The median age in the village was 50.5 years. 18.7% of residents were under the age of 18; 3.9% were between the ages of 18 and 24; 20.1% were from 25 to 44; 36.2% were from 45 to 64; and 21.3% were 65 years of age or older. The gender makeup of the village was 48.1% male and 51.9% female.

=== 2000 census ===
As of the census of 2000, there were 287 people, 128 households, and 86 families residing in the village. The population density was 644.2 inhabitants per square mile (248.7/km^{2}). There were 151 housing units at an average density of 338.9 per square mile (130.9/km^{2}). The racial makeup of the village was 97.91% White, 0.70% Native American, and 1.39% from two or more races.

There were 128 households, out of which 24.2% had children under the age of 18 living with them, 59.4% were married couples living together, 3.9% had a female householder with no husband present, and 32.8% were non-families. 28.1% of all households were made up of individuals, and 18.0% had someone living alone who was 65 years of age or older. The average household size was 2.24 and the average family size was 2.73.

In the village, the population was spread out, with 21.3% under the age of 18, 6.3% from 18 to 24, 23.0% from 25 to 44, 19.9% from 45 to 64, and 29.6% who were 65 years of age or older. The median age was 44 years. For every 100 females, there were 86.4 males. For every 100 females aged 18 and over, there were 93.2 males.

As of 2000 the median income for a household in the village was $31,750, and the median income for a family was $41,250. Males had a median income of $26,250 versus $20,804 for females. The per capita income for the village was $16,175. About 2.6% of families and 2.1% of the population were below the poverty line, including none of those under the age of 18 and 7.1% of those 65 and older.

== Education ==
Local children attend Meridian School or Tri County High School.
