= Wilber, Nebraska =

City in Saline County, Nebraska, United States

- City
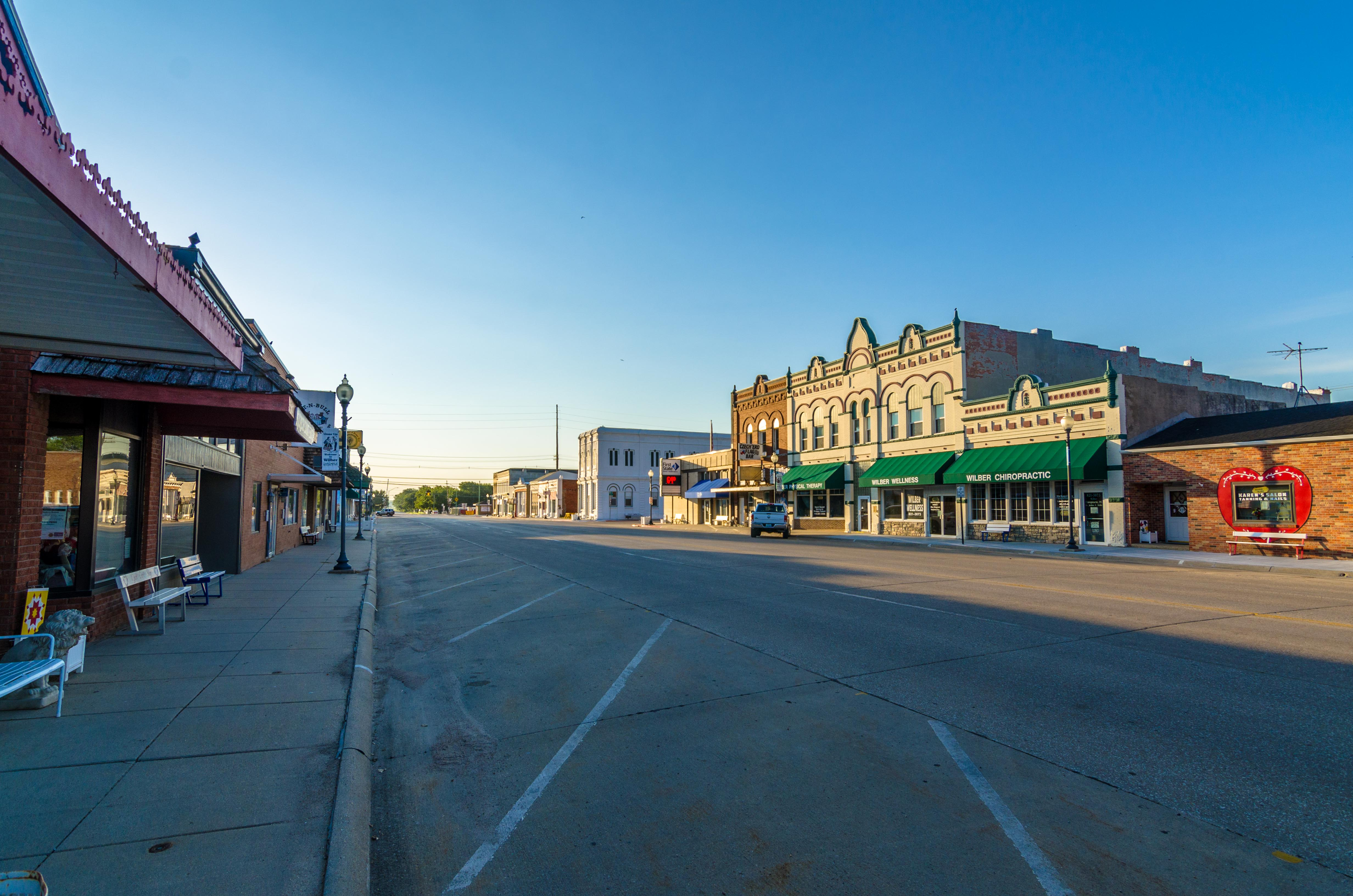
- Downtown Wilber viewed from West 3rd Street (Nebraska Highway 41), July 2017

- Location of Wilber, Nebraska
- Coordinates: 40°28′51″N 96°57′53″W
- Country: United States
- State: Nebraska
- County: Saline

Area
  - Total: 0.90 sq mi (2.34 km^{2})
  - Land: 0.90 sq mi (2.33 km^{2})
  - Water: 0.0039 sq mi (0.01 km^{2})
- Elevation: 1,335 ft (407 m)

Population (2020)
  - Total: 1,937
  - Density: 2,150.7/sq mi (830.39/km^{2})
- Time zone: UTC-6 (Central (CST))
  - Summer (DST): UTC-5 (CDT)
- ZIP code: 68465
- Area code: 402
- FIPS code: 31-52960
- GNIS feature ID: 2397309
- Website: https://cityofwilber.com/

Wilber is a city in and the county seat of Saline County, Nebraska, United States. As of the 2020 census, Wilber had a population of 1,937. It is the county seat of Saline County. Wilber is the official "Czech Capital of the USA" and hosts an annual Czech festival in August. Wilber's school is the Wilber-Clatonia High School.

== History ==
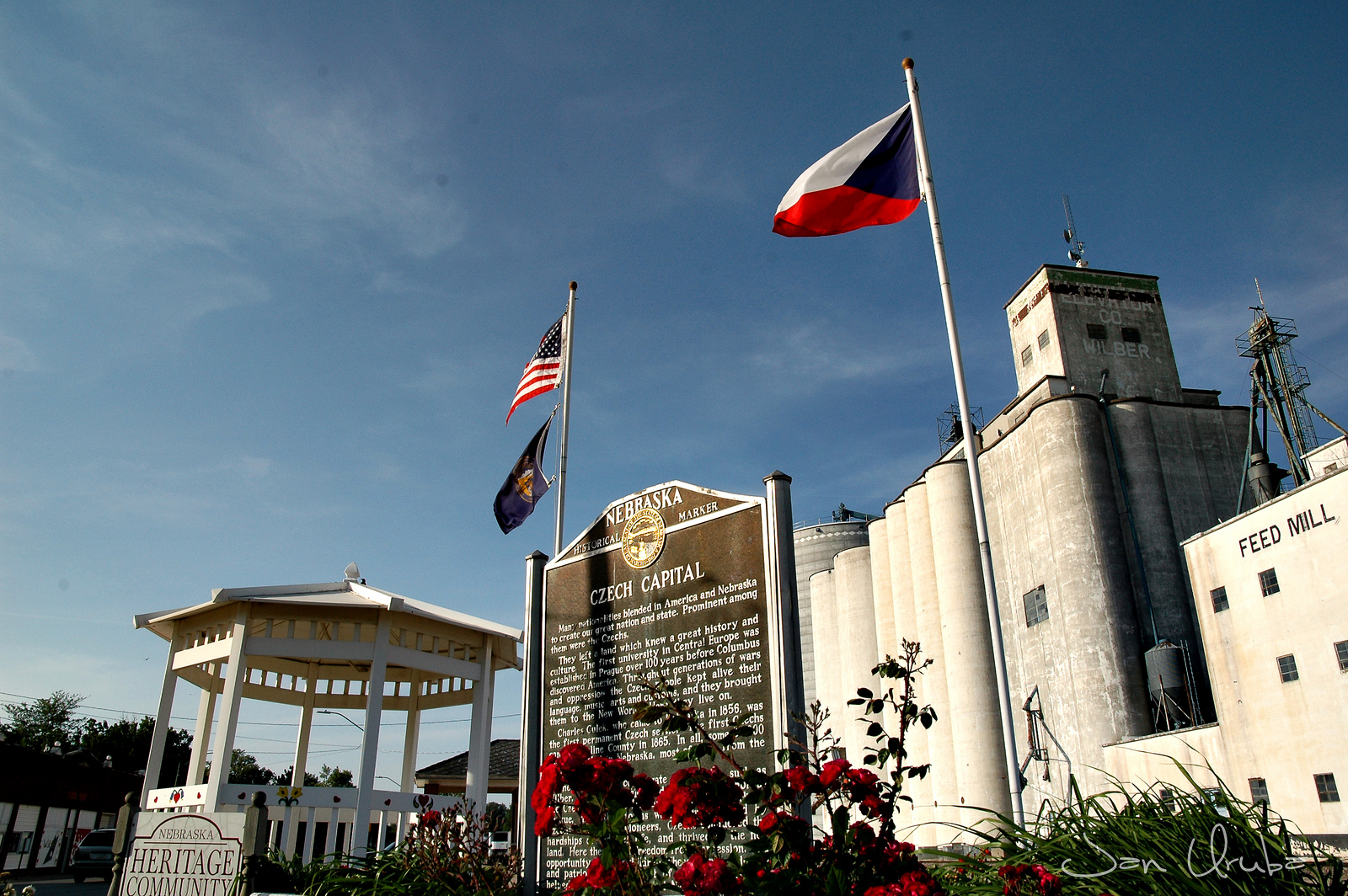
Wilber, Nebraska - Czech Capital of the United States, February 2013

Wilber was platted in 1873 by C. D. Wilber, and named for him. In 1878, the seat of Saline County was transferred to Wilber from Pleasant Hill.

Wilber was declared the official Czech Capital of the United States on July 10, 1987, in a decree signed by president Ronald Reagan. Wilber hosts the annual Czech Days festival which celebrates the city's Czech heritage.

== Geography ==
According to the United States Census Bureau, the city has a total area of 0.90 square miles (2.33 km^{2}), all land.

== Demographics ==
Historical population
Census	Pop.	Note	%±
1880	710		—
1890	1,226		72.7%
1900	1,054		−14.0%
1910	1,219		15.7%
1920	1,255		3.0%
1930	1,352		7.7%
1940	1,355		0.2%
1950	1,356		0.1%
1960	1,358		0.1%
1970	1,483		9.2%
1980	1,624		9.5%
1990	1,527		−6.0%
2000	1,761		15.3%
2010	1,855		5.3%
2020	1,937		4.4%
U.S. Decennial Census; 2012 Estimate

=== 2010 census ===
As of the census of 2010, there were 1,855 people, 696 households, and 449 families living in the city. The population density was 2,061.1 inhabitants per square mile (795.8/km^{2}). There were 782 housing units at an average density of 868.9 units per square mile (335.5 units/km^{2}). The racial makeup of the city was 90.5% White, 1.8% African American, 0.6% Native American, 1.8% Asian, 0.4% Pacific Islander, 3.6% from other races, and 1.3% from two or more races. Hispanic or Latino of any race were 10.8% of the population.

There were 696 households, of which 34.9% had children under the age of 18 living with them, 51.6% were married couples living together, 8.9% had a female householder with no husband present, 4.0% had a male householder with no wife present, and 35.5% were non-families. 31.0% of all households were made up of individuals, and 14.4% had someone living alone who was 65 years of age or older. The average household size was 2.42 and the average family size was 3.01.

The median age in the city was 38.8 years. 25% of residents were under the age of 18; 6.4% were between the ages of 18 and 24; 27.9% were from 25 to 44; 23.2% were from 45 to 64; and 17.6% were 65 years of age or older. The gender makeup of the city was 49.6% male and 50.4% female.

=== 2000 census ===
As of the census of 2000, there were 1,761 people, 728 households, and 457 families living in the city. The population density was 1,960.2 inhabitants per square mile (756.8/km^{2}). There were 795 housing units at an average density of 884.9 units per square mile (341.7 units/km^{2}). The racial makeup of the city was 97.33% White, 0.06% Native American, 0.85% Asian, 0.11% Pacific Islander, 1.14% from other races, and 0.51% from two or more races. Hispanic or Latino of any race were 1.82% of the population.

There were 728 households, out of which 32.6% had children under the age of 18 living with them, 50.8% were married couples living together, 8.2% had a female householder with no husband present, and 37.2% were non-families. 33.4% of all households were made up of individuals, and 17.6% had someone living alone who was 65 years of age or older. The average household size was 2.31 and the average family size was 2.97.

In the city, the population was spread out, with 25.7% under the age of 18, 7.2% from 18 to 24, 27.1% from 25 to 44, 17.7% from 45 to 64, and 22.3% who were 65 years of age or older. The median age was 38 years. For every 100 females, there were 87.3 males. For every 100 females age 18 and over, there were 83.1 males.

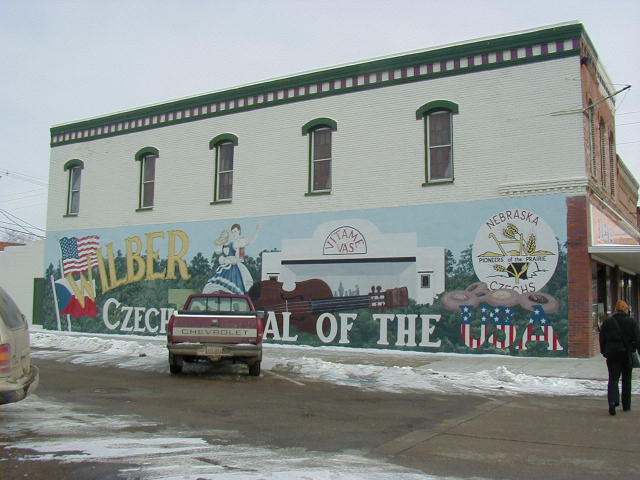
A mural in Wilber depicting "Czech Capital of the USA", December 2000

As of 2000 the median income for a household in the city was $36,513, and the median income for a family was $45,556. Males had a median income of $31,000 versus $21,824 for females. The per capita income for the city was $18,249. About 4.4% of families and 7.6% of the population were below the poverty line, including 8.3% of those under age 18 and 9.2% of those age 65 or over.

== Notable people ==
- Dana Altman, former head men's basketball coach at the University of Oregon
- C. L. Edson, newspaper columnist, humorist, and poet
- Steve Hokuf, American football player
- Josh Lamberson, American football player and coach
- Russ Karpisek, Nebraska legislator
- Laurence Wild, 1913 NCAA Men's Basketball All-American and 30th Governor of American Samoa.

== See also ==
- List of municipalities in Nebraska
