= Penkala =

Penkala may refer to:

- Slavoljub Eduard Penkala
- TOZ Penkala, a manufacturer of stationery products
- 14134 Penkala
