= Edvard Rusjan =

Slovenian aviation pioneer

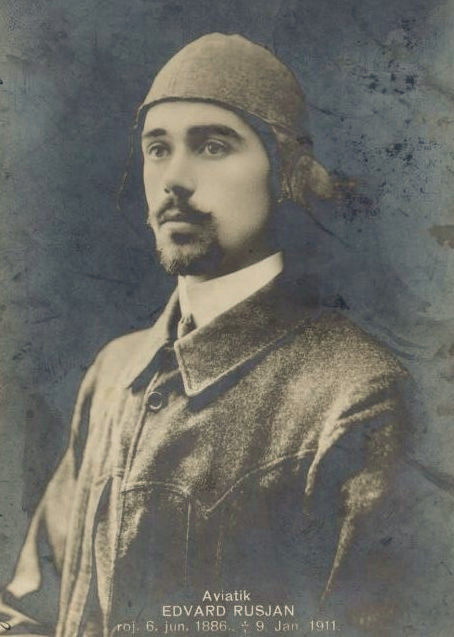
- Edvard Rusjan in 1911
- Born: June 6, 1886; Trieste, Austria-Hungary
- Died: January 9, 1911 (aged 24); Belgrade, Kingdom of Serbia
- Occupation(s): bicycle retailer/manufacturer, airplane inventor/manufacturer, pilot trainer

Edvard Rusjan (6 June 1886 – 9 January 1911) was a Slovenian–Friulian flight pioneer and airplane constructor from the Austro-Hungarian Empire. He died in an airplane crash in Belgrade.

== Biography ==
Rusjan was born in Trieste, then the major port of Austria-Hungary (now in Italy). His parents were both natives of the Gorizia and Gradisca region: his father, Franc Rusjan, was a Slovene, and his mother, Grazia Cabas, was Friulian. Rusjan spent his childhood and adolescence in Gorizia, in the suburb of Rafut.

In his youth, he became a professional bicyclist, and designed his own bicycle models, together with his brother Josip Rusjan. He was also member of the Sokol gymnastic association.

He made his first flight on 25 November 1909, near Gorizia, in Eda I, a biplane of his own design. Eda was Edvard's nickname, given by his mother.

The flight was covered 60 m (200 ft) and reached a height of 2 m (6 ft 7 in). On 29 November 1909, he flew 600 m (2,000 ft) at an altitude of 12 m (39 ft). The original design was followed by several improved versions. He moved to a hangar near Miren south of Gorizia.

Rusjan first attended a public flight event with the model EDA V on 6 December 1909, when his aircraft broke apart at landing. In June 1910, he tried the model EDA VI, which enabled him to fly 40 meters above the ground and overfly the whole Miren Field.

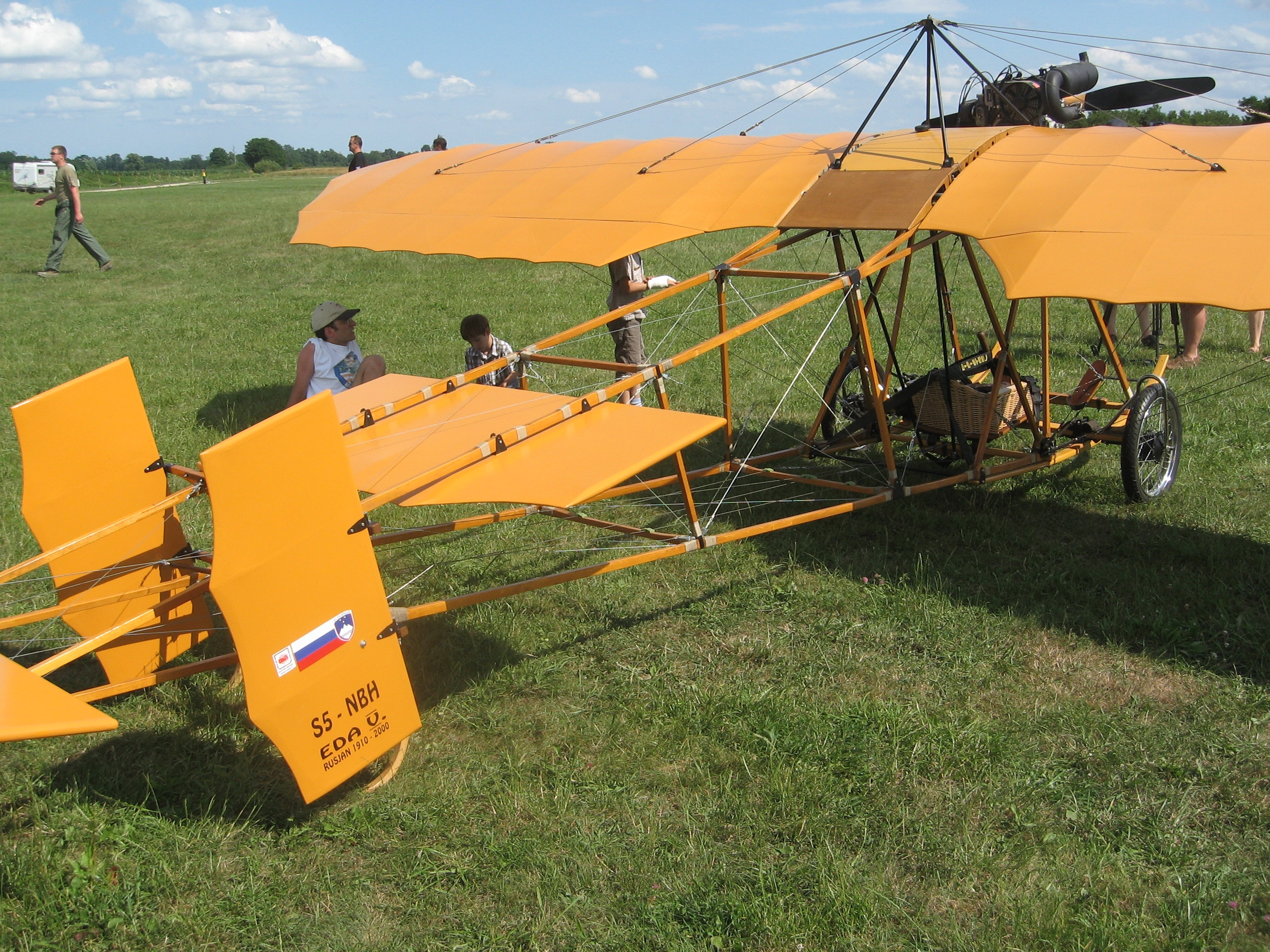
Replica of Rusjan airplane Eda V

The brothers Rusjan ran out of finance for the construction of EDA VII. In 1910 Edvard Rusjan met the businessman Mihajlo Merćep from Zagreb, Croatia (then part of Austria-Hungary), who offered him financial help for his endeavors. The same year, the brothers moved to Zagreb, Croatia, when they started a project of airplane construction on larger scale together with first Croatian pilot Dragutin Novak, who flew before with Eduard Slavoljub Penkala.
In November 1910, they constructed a new model, called "Sokol".

In January 1911, Edvard and Josip Rusjan went on a promotional tour through the Balkan cities. During a flight in Belgrade, Serbia on 9 January 1911 [O.S. 27 December 1910] a strong wind broke a wing of Edvard's aeroplane and it dived into a railway embankment near the Belgrade Fortress in a fatal crash. His funeral was attended by a large crowd of about 14,000 people.

He is interred at Belgrade's New Cemetery, lot 15, grave 343.

== Legacy ==
The Maribor Edvard Rusjan Airport and asteroid 19633 Rusjan are named after him. The commercial and business center Eda Center in Nova Gorica is dedicated to Rusjan's memory.

One of the DC-10s in the JAT fleet was named after Edvard Rusjan.

One Slovenian Armed Forces C-27J Spartan transport plane was named after Edvard Rusjan.
