= Polish Falcons of America =

Nonprofit fraternal benefit society

- Established: 1887; 139 years ago
- Founded at: Chicago, United States
- Type: Mutual aid society
- Location: Pittsburgh, Pennsylvania, United States
- Region served: United States
- Website: polishfalcons.org

The Polish Falcons of America (Polish: Sokoły Polskie Ameryki) is a nonprofit fraternal benefit society, with a strong emphasis on physical fitness.The organization is a member of the World Sokol Federation.

== History ==
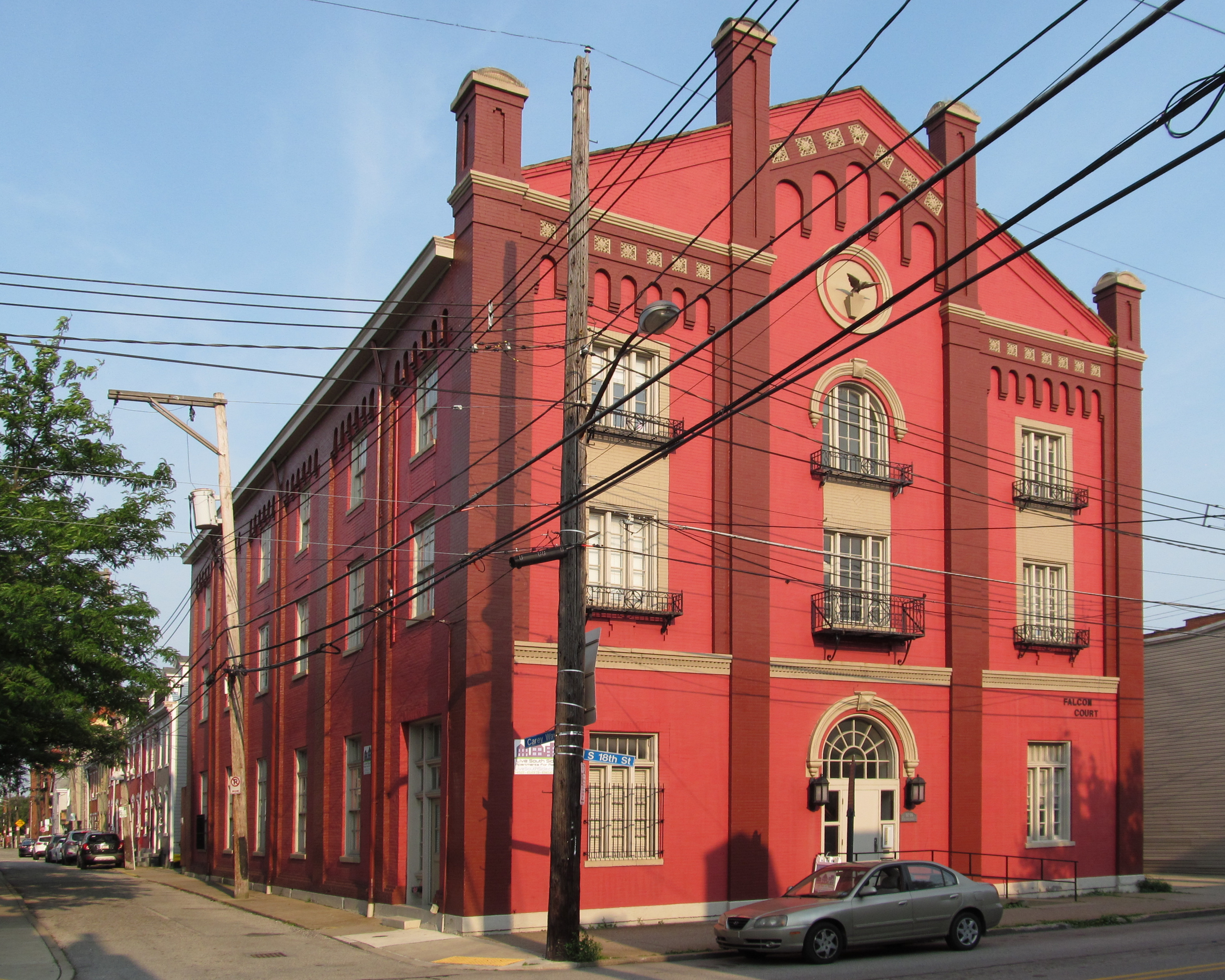
The former Polish Falcons building in South Side Flats, Pittsburgh, Pennsylvania.

The Polish Sokół movement (sokół meaning "falcon") originated after the suppression of the Polish uprising of 1863. Its goal was to regenerate the Polish nation through physical fitness. The first "nest" in the United States was founded in 1887 in Chicago by Felix Pietrowicz.

By 1894 there were twelve nests in the country. On May 1 of that year the Alliance of Polish Turners in the United States of America was charted in Chicago as a national organization of the falcon movement in the United States. In 1914 the name was changed to Polish Falcons Alliance of America. The organization adopted its present name on March 30, 1928.

== Organization ==
As stated, the local units of the PFA are called "Nests". There were 160 nests in 1979 and 82 in 2016. Regional structures are called "Districts", which must have at least 500 members. The national convention meets quadrennially. Pittsburgh, Pennsylvania has been the headquarters of the group since 1912.

== Membership ==
Membership is open to people of Polish or Slavic descent, or the spouses of same, who are between 16 and 60 years old, of good moral character, and mentally and physically sound. Social membership without insurance, is also available. In 1978 the Falcons had 26,346 beneficiary members and 2,867 social members. In 1994, there were 30,000 members.

== See also ==
- Turner movement
