= Mihailo Merćep =

Mihailo Merćep (Serbian Cyrillic: Михаило Мерћеп; 1864–1937) was a Serbian flight pioneer.

== Biography ==
Born in Dubrovnik in a tradesman family, then a part of Austria-Hungary, Merćep started his primary education in Kladovo, Serbia and finished on the other side of the Danube in Turn-Severin (today Drobeta-Turnu Severin in Romania), He returned to his native town in 1878 where he worked as a merchant though his main interests lay in photography.

At the beginning of the 1880s he moved to Belgrade, where he was one of the co-founders of the first Serbian velocipede society (1884). In 1893 he embarked on a spectacular bicycle journey: he was to ride his bike from Belgrade to Chicago (with ship transport from Hamburg to New York) to be there in time for the World Expo and second world championship in bicycling. In Chicago Merćep witnessed some attempts of flying. Next four years he spent in Dallas, where he embarked on a cyclist career. In 1897 he returned to Serbia this time cycling from Dallas to New York and again from Hamburg to Belgrade. In 1898 Merćep joined with the Belgrade cycling champion publisher Sveta Savić and actor Ljuba Stanojević and together they cycled through “Serb Lands”: across Bosnia and Herzegovina to Montenegro and then across Boka Kotorska to Dubrovnik.

At the beginning of the 20th century Merćep moved to Zagreb where he opened a photo studio. Apart from cycling he was now also in motorcycling and cars, organizing some of the first car “tours” in Croatia. In one cycling race he met Slovene Edvard Rusjan, who was also interested in airplanes. Since in Rusjan was already close to finishing his biplane EDA I that flew on 25 November 1909 – an event marked as the first flight of any South Slav. During 1910 Edvard Rusjan built seven more planes with various successes. After Merćep gave Rusjan the much needed financial help, they joined in and built a hangar in Zagreb, where Merćep planned a production of aircraft for the market. A supplemented variant of EDA VI was named Merćep-Rusjan. This monoplane proved to be far better than the previous and rose to a record height of 28 meters, 4 meters above the previous maximum achieved by Louis Bleriot. With this height Rusjan was able to make a flight over Zagreb in late 1910. However, the first Serbian air meeting in Belgrade in January 1911 was fatal for Rusjan. Merćep continued work with Edvard's brother Josip and produced three more aircraft in which they trained pilots and gave many performances across Austria-Hungary. Merćep's success was crowned in 1912 when he was declared the best pilot of the Empire.

In the meantime Merćep became the member of the Sokol association in Zagreb (1909). After the assassination of Archduke Franz Ferdinand of Austria in 1914, Merćep was jailed as a declared Serb nationalist. After six months and many interventions of his friends he was out of prison only to find out that his hangar and workshop have been destroyed by the anti-Serb mob. This was the last of Merćep's pilot and constructionist career.

After the Great War, Merćep initiated the founding of aero club in Zagreb in 1925 and was one of the founders of the Aero-Club of the Kingdom of Serbs, Croats and Slovenes in the same year. He died in Belgrade.
