= Encyclopedia of Czechoslovak Military 1920–1938 =

Encyklopedie branné moci Republiky československé 1920 - 1938 (- in Czech, Encyclopedia of Czechoslovak Military 1920 - 1938) is a printed Czech language encyclopedia covering the military of the First Republic of Czechoslovakia. It was published in 2006 by publisher Libri, ISBN 80-7277-256-2.

The book was written by Jiří Fidler and Václav Sluka, both military historians specialized on prewar era. The book, with 768 pages and over 3,000 entries, covers:

- weapons,
- personalities (including weapon designers, military related details of Czechoslovak politicians and biographies of French generals serving in Czechoslovakia),
- units and their locations,
- armament industry and other infrastructure.

The encyclopedia uses traditional form and its entries are sorted alphabetically. Photographs, plans and layouts accompany the text entries. The period covered starts with 1920 unification of local military forces (former Austro-Hungarian units, volunteers and paramilitaries as Sokol) and the Czechoslovak Legions built abroad and ends with the general mobilization in 1938 (which was followed by the Munich Agreement). Some biographies also include later events.
