= Edmund Moster =

- Born: 24 August 1873; Sveti Ivan Žabno, Kingdom of Croatia-Slavonia, Austria-Hungary
- Died: 1942 (aged 68–69); Jasenovac, Independent State of Croatia
- Cause of death: Murdered in the Holocaust
- Occupation: Entrepreneur
- Spouse: Klara Breitenstein
- Parent(s): Hinko Moster; Terezija Lederer

Edmund Moster (24 August 1873 – 1942) was a Croatian Jewish entrepreneur, industrialist, inventor and co-founder of the "Penkala-Moster Company" (now TOZ) in Zagreb.

== Biography ==
"Penkala-Moster" pen and pencil company in Zagreb

Moster was born and raised to a Jewish family of Hinko Moster and Terezija Lederer, with nine siblings in Sveti Ivan Žabno near Križevci. His father was much respected tradesman and steam mill owner in Sveti Ivan Žabno. The Moster family's wealth had been earned by diligence and shrewdness. Moster was married to Klara Breitenstein. In 1911, Moster and his brother Mavro collaborated with Slavoljub Eduard Penkala to open the "Penkala-Moster" pen and pencil company in Zagreb. Moster and his brother owned 66,6% of the company, and Penkala 33,3%. Moster would later open another company, in Berlin, Germany, which was headed by his other brother, Alexander Moster. Moster held 3 patents: improvements in refill lead pencils in 1916, improvements in or relating to paper-board heels for shoes and boots in 1936 and improvements in or relating to bottle closures in 1938. Moster later developed the production of the Winner Records in Croatia. As a Jew, during World War II, Moster was deported and imprisoned at the Jasenovac concentration camp where he was killed in 1942. His brother Bernard was also killed during the Holocaust in 1942, at Rab concentration camp. After the war "Penkala-Moster Company" was nationalised and renamed to "TOZ Company" by the regime of newly established SFR Yugoslavia.

== See also ==
- Slavoljub Eduard Penkala

== Bibliography ==
- Snješka Knežević, Aleksander Laslo (2011). Židovski Zagreb. Zagreb: AGM, Židovska općina Zagreb. ISBN 978-953-174-393-8.
