= Sokół movement =

Polish offshoot of the Czech Sokol movement

"Falcon" Polish Gymnastic Society
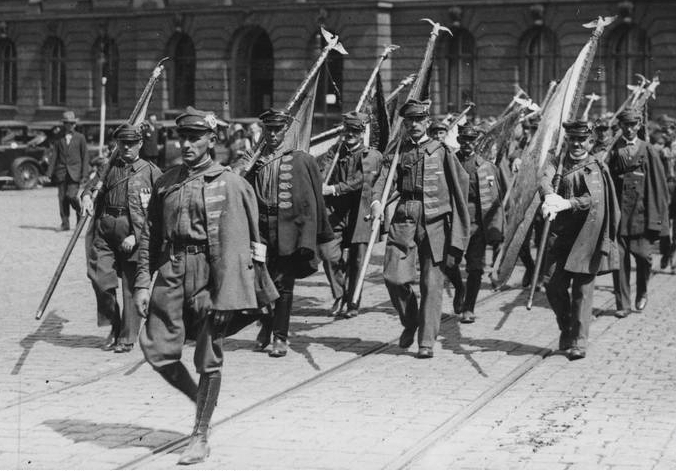
- Founded: 7 February 1867; 159 years ago
- Founder: Jan Żaplachta-Zapałowicz, Józef Milleret
- Founded at: Lwów, Kingdom of Galicia and Lodomeria
- Type: gymnastics society
- Headquarters: Warsaw, Poland
- Region served: Poland

Sokół (Polish: [ˈsɔkuw], English: Falcon), or in full the Polskie Towarzystwo Gimnastyczne "Sokół" (English: "Falcon" Polish Gymnastic Society), is the Polish offshoot of the Czech Sokol movement, and the oldest youth movement organization of Poland. Created in Lwów in 1867, by the end of World War I the movement had its units – gniazda ("Nests") – in all parts of Poland, as well as among the Polish communities abroad. The group's goal was to develop fitness, both physically and mentally, with a motto mens sana in corpore sano ("a fit spirit in a fit body").

== History ==
Sokół was formed February 7, 1867 in Lwów, then a capital of Austro-Hungarian Galicia. The basic aims of the society were promotion of gymnastics and national revival in all parts of partitioned Poland. In 1885 the first chairman, Józef Millert managed to convince the German authorities to allow for Sokół "nests" to be formed in German-held parts of Poland. After the Revolution of 1905 the Sokół expanded into the Russian Empire.

As opposed to the Scouting movement which emerged in Poland simultaneously (largely promoted by Józef Piłsudski's socialists), the Sokół tended to be right wing, with the majority of important posts taken by supporters of Roman Dmowski's National League. It promoted gymnastics and healthy life, as well as traditional moral values. The movement opposed football, as a plebeian sport. Because of that, many members left the organization in early 20th century and founded their own football clubs, among them the Czarni Lwów - the first football team in Poland.

=== In Kuyavia and Greater Poland ===
The first branches in the Prussian Partition of Poland were founded in the regions of Kuyavia and Greater Poland, i.e. in the cities of Inowrocław (1884), Poznań (1886), Bydgoszcz (1886), Szamotuły (1887), Gniezno (1887), Pleszew (1889), Ostrów Wielkopolski (1889), Śrem (1893), Kruszwica (1893). In 1893, a union of the "Sokół" Gymnastic Societies of Greater Poland was established, later transformed into a union of Polish "Sokół" Gymnastic Societies in Germany, as branches were founded also in other regions, e.g. Kuyavia, Pomerania and Silesia, and by the Polish diaspora in present-day Germany, including in Berlin and Charlottenburg.

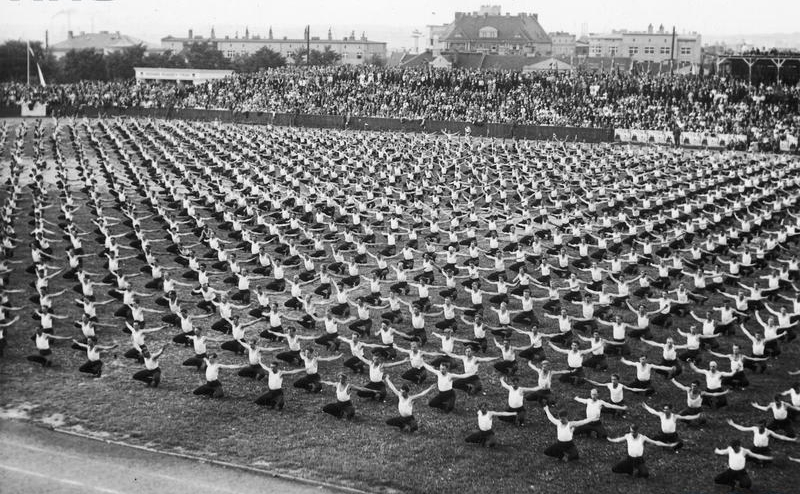
8th All-Polish Congress of the "Falcon" Polish Gymnastic Society in Katowice, 1937

In Kuyavia and Greater Poland, Sokół became an important group dedicated to Polish independence. In the German partition of Poland, from the beginning, the Sokół movement met with police persecutions, controls, harassment and provocations. This stopped only after the Sokół accepted constant police supervision. Another change was that only adults could become members. Because of this, Sokół president Bernard Chrzanowski, and vice-president Ksawery Zakrzewski, suggested setting up independent youth organizations, which would have rented, for a nominal pay, the gymnastic chambers by hours or days.

Alfred Filip Zawadyński was the first founder of Sokół, in Sokołów Podlaski, Poland.

German police began to harass and persecute all the new organizations again, and for a time forbade any further activity. Attorney Chrzanowski argued that the police had no proof and could present no link, neither personal nor financial, between these organizations and Sokół. He took the case all the way to the Supreme Court of Justice in Berlin. It was shown that the president of "Iskra", Kazimierz Syller, "Brzask" Stanisław Szulc, and of "Ogniwo" Edmund Maćkowiak, nor any other adult member had ever been members of Sokół. The jury canceled the laws, but this caused even more harassment from the police and attempts to penetrate the organizations by informers began.

=== In Silesia ===
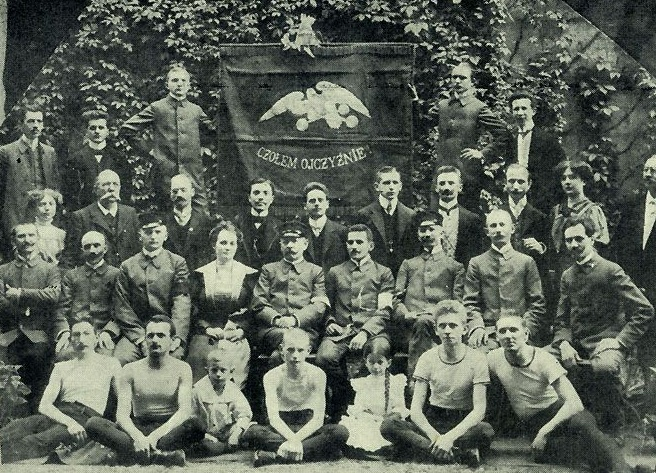
Members of the "Sokół" Polish Gymnastic Society in Wrocław, 1910

In Silesia, the first branches were founded in Cieszyn (1891), Dąbrowa (1893), Wrocław (1894), Bytom (1895), Katowice (1896), Rybnik (1898), Roździeń (1898), Chorzów (1901), Lipiny (1901), Michałkowice (1903), Mysłowice (1903), Frysztat (1903), Bielsko (1903), Karwina (1903), Gliwice (1904), Koźle (1904), Strzelce (1904), Zabrze (before 1905), Dziedzice (1905), Kosztowy, (1905), Lutynia Dolna (1905), Wędrynia (1906), Orłowa (1906). The German police thwarted the establishment of Sokół in Mikołów in 1903. Several branches were dissolved after court trials and police harassment, but some were eventually reestablished. Sokół's activities in Silesia went beyond gymnastics, also including singing, recitations, amateur theater, and education.

The local German authorities refused to allow the use of public gymnasiums, arguing that Sokół intended to cultivate national sentiment, which is fundamentally contrary to the general idea of the (German) state. Private tenants were encouraged to demand exorbitant rents for space leased to Sokół or to terminate their leases, and some members were dismissed from their jobs. The German police conducted searches of Sokół's offices and members' homes, and German courts handed down prison sentences and fines on its members. In 1896, a German court in Bytom declared Sokół a political organization, justification for this included trips by members of the local Sokół branch to Kraków and Wrocław and the use of the Polish language.

=== In Pomerania ===
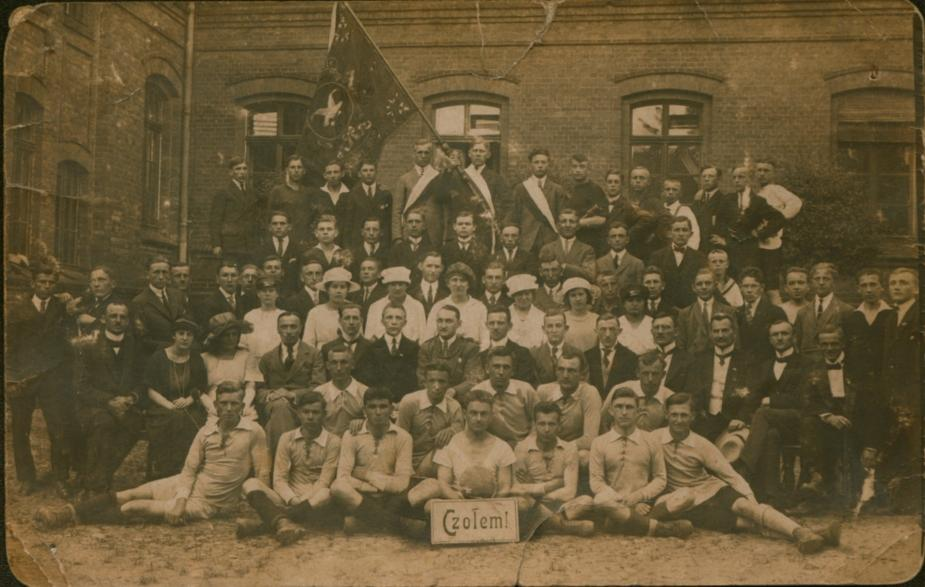
Members of the "Sokół" Polish Gymnastic Society in Kościerzyna, c. 1925

Pomerania and the Chełmno Land had fewer Sokół branches than Greater Poland and Silesia. The first branches were established in 1893–1896 in Toruń, Gdańsk, Grudziądz, Chełmno, Chełmża, Wąbrzeźno, Kościerzyna, Świecie, Lubawa and Pelplin. Before the First World War further branches were founded in Łęg (1904), Starogard (1909), Czersk (1912), Osie (1912), Sopot (1912), Nowa Wieś Królewska (1913), Gruczno (1913), Kowalewo (1913), Tuchola (1913) and Brodnica (1913).

=== In the Russian Partition of Poland ===
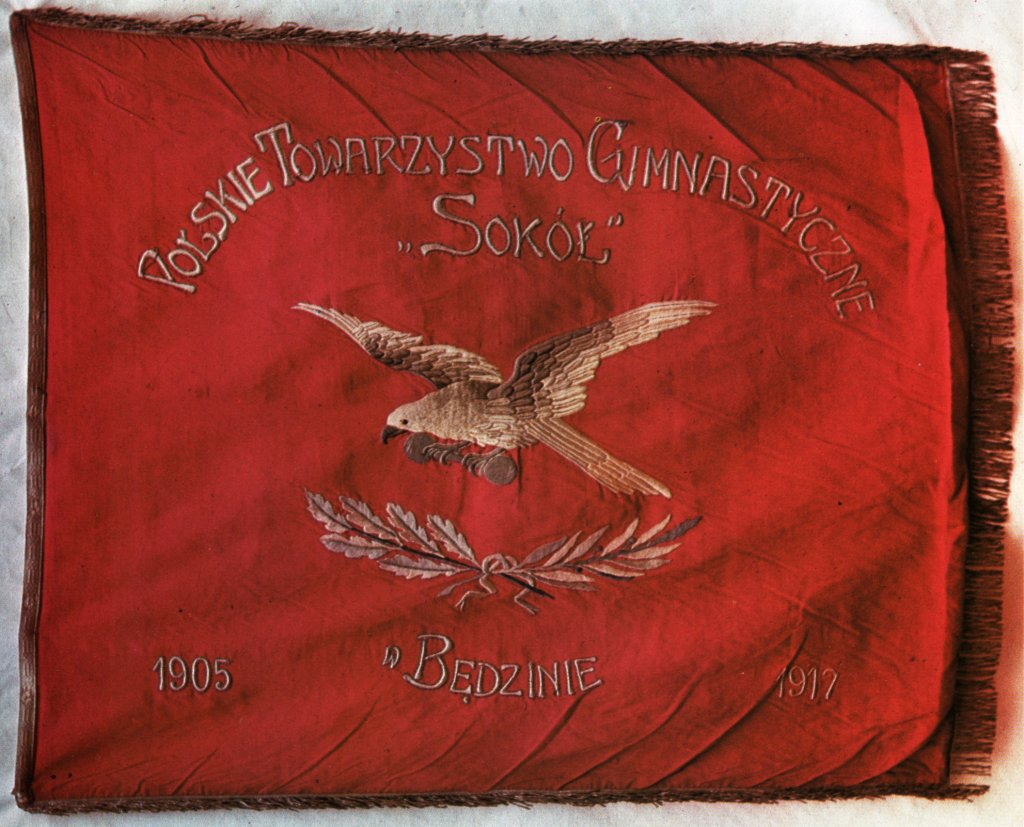
Banner of the Będzin-based Sokół nest

First branches of the Sokół Polish Gymnastic Society in the Russian Partition of Poland were founded in 1905–1906, in Warsaw, Radom, Piotrków, Łódź, the Dąbrowa Basin, Kalisz, Częstochowa, Wilno and Włocławek.

=== Between wars ===
After Poland regained her independence, in 1919 the nests formed in various partitions were united in the Union of Gymnastic Societies "Sokół". After the Polish defeat in 1939 the new Soviet and Nazi authorities banned the Sokół and it was not allowed to emerge after the war. It was not until 1988 that the ban was lifted by the Communist authorities of Poland. During that time only minor nests continued their activity abroad, among the Polish diaspora in the United Kingdom, United States (Polish Falcons), France and several other countries. The following year, on January 10, the first nest since World War II was officially registered and on March 1, 1990, the society was again registered in Poland. Currently the organization has 86 nests and claims to have approximately 10,000 members both in Poland and abroad.

== Post WWII ==
In 1947, the organization was officially delegalized by the communist authorities of the Polish People's Republic. All information relating to the "Sokół" Polish Gymnastic Society was subject to censorship. The society was registered on 10 January 1989 and then on 1 March 1990 its name was changed to Union of "Sokół" Gymnastics Societies in Poland (Związek Towarzystw Gimnastycznych "Sokół" w Polsce). Currently, the union has an estimated number of 8,000 members organized in 80 groups known as gniazda (nests). The "Sokół" union continues the traditions of its pre-WWII predecessor and is committed to instilling the values of patriotism, education and civic duty in its young members as well as strengthening the love of the country and a sense of national identity. In 2017, the Polish Sejm and Senate passed a special resolution commemorating the 150th anniversary of the foundation of the "Sokół" Polish Gymnastic Society.

In 2025, during an event in Poland, titled Let Us Lift This World on Sokols’ Wings: A History of the World Sokol Movement, an international popular-science conference was organized to commemorate the 100th anniversary of the founding of the World Sokol Federation.

== Gallery ==
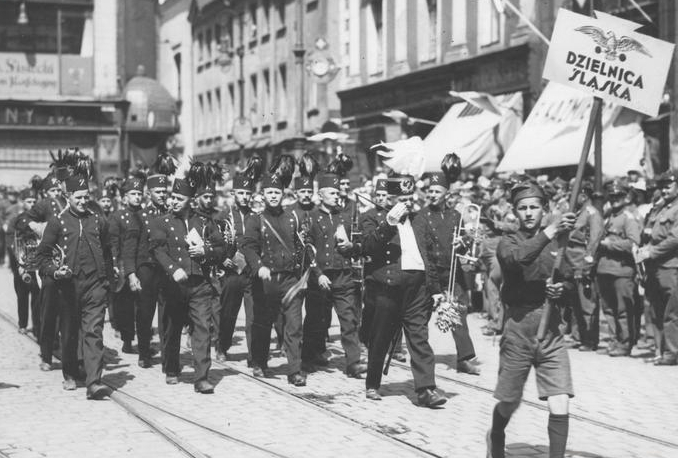
A march of the "Sokół" Gymnastic Society Orchestra, Poznań, 1934

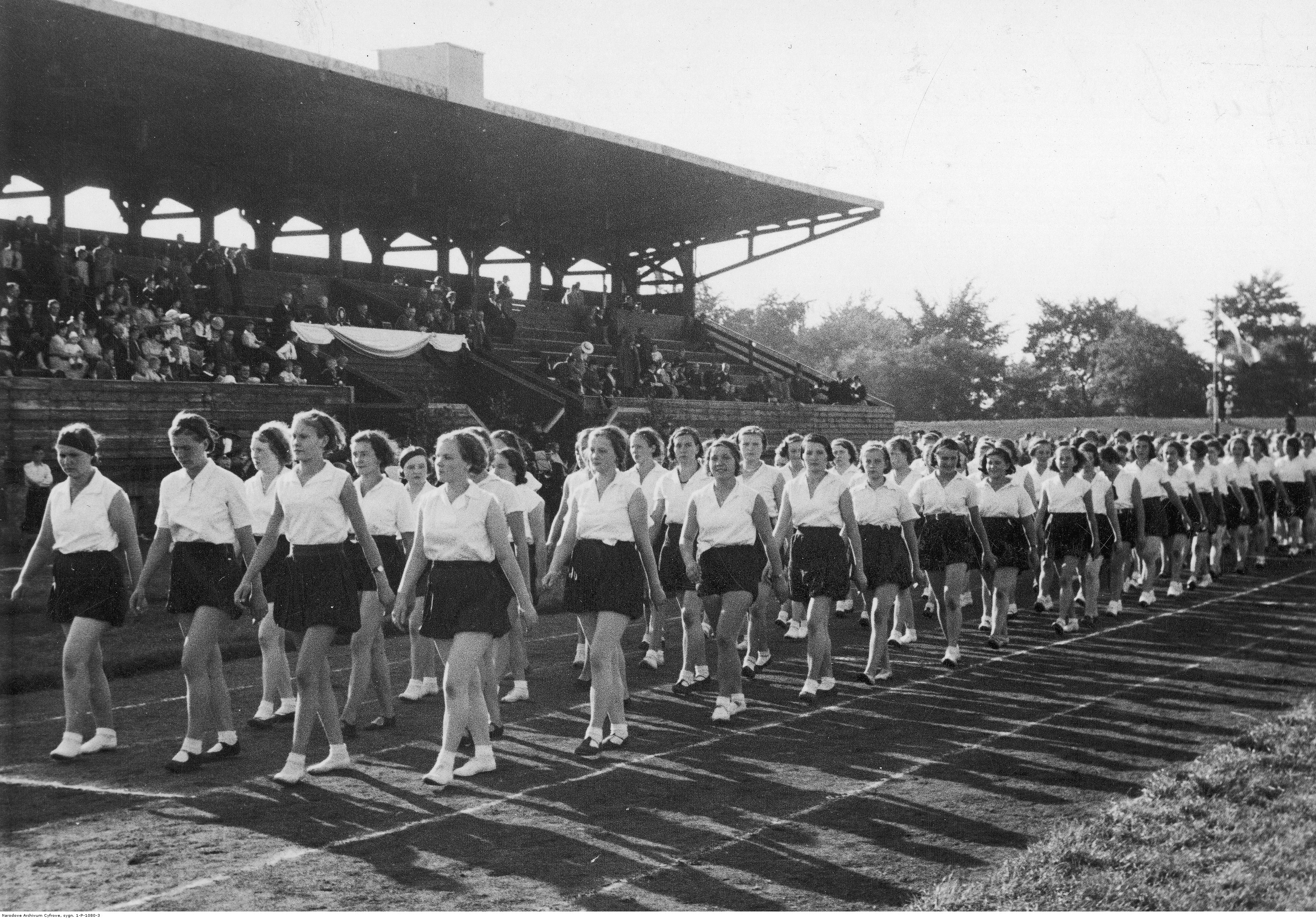
TG Sokół Katowice, 1935

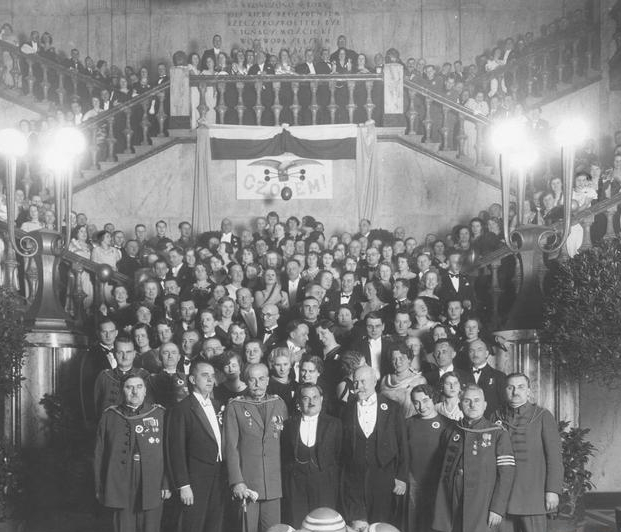
Silesian authorities and "Sokół" members, Silesian Parliament, 1934

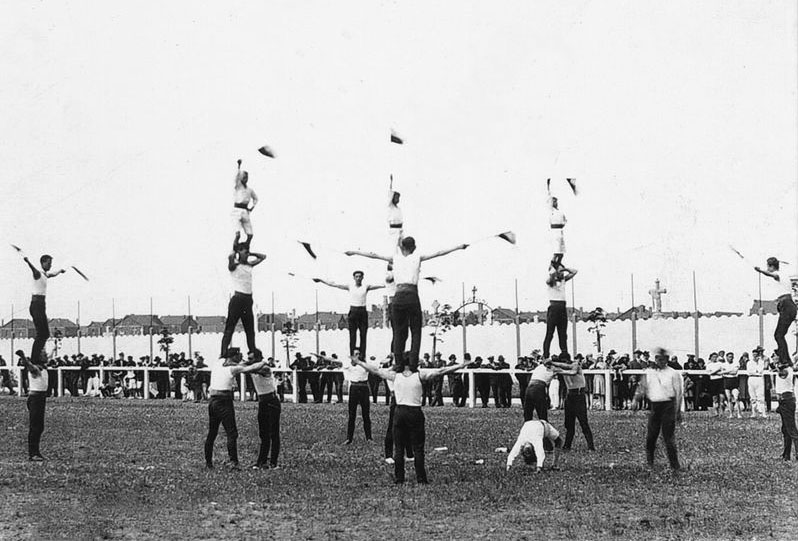
A gymnastics competition of the "Sokół" Society in Dechy, France, 1920s

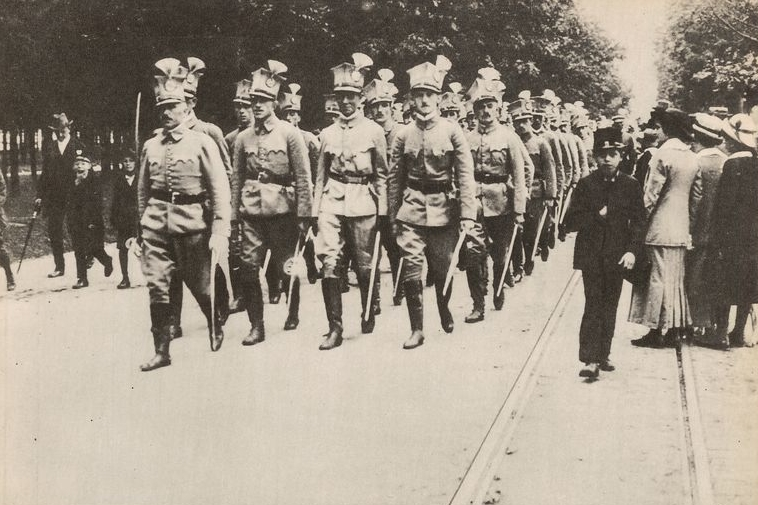
A team of members of "Sokół" Society joins the Polish Legions, Kraków, 1914

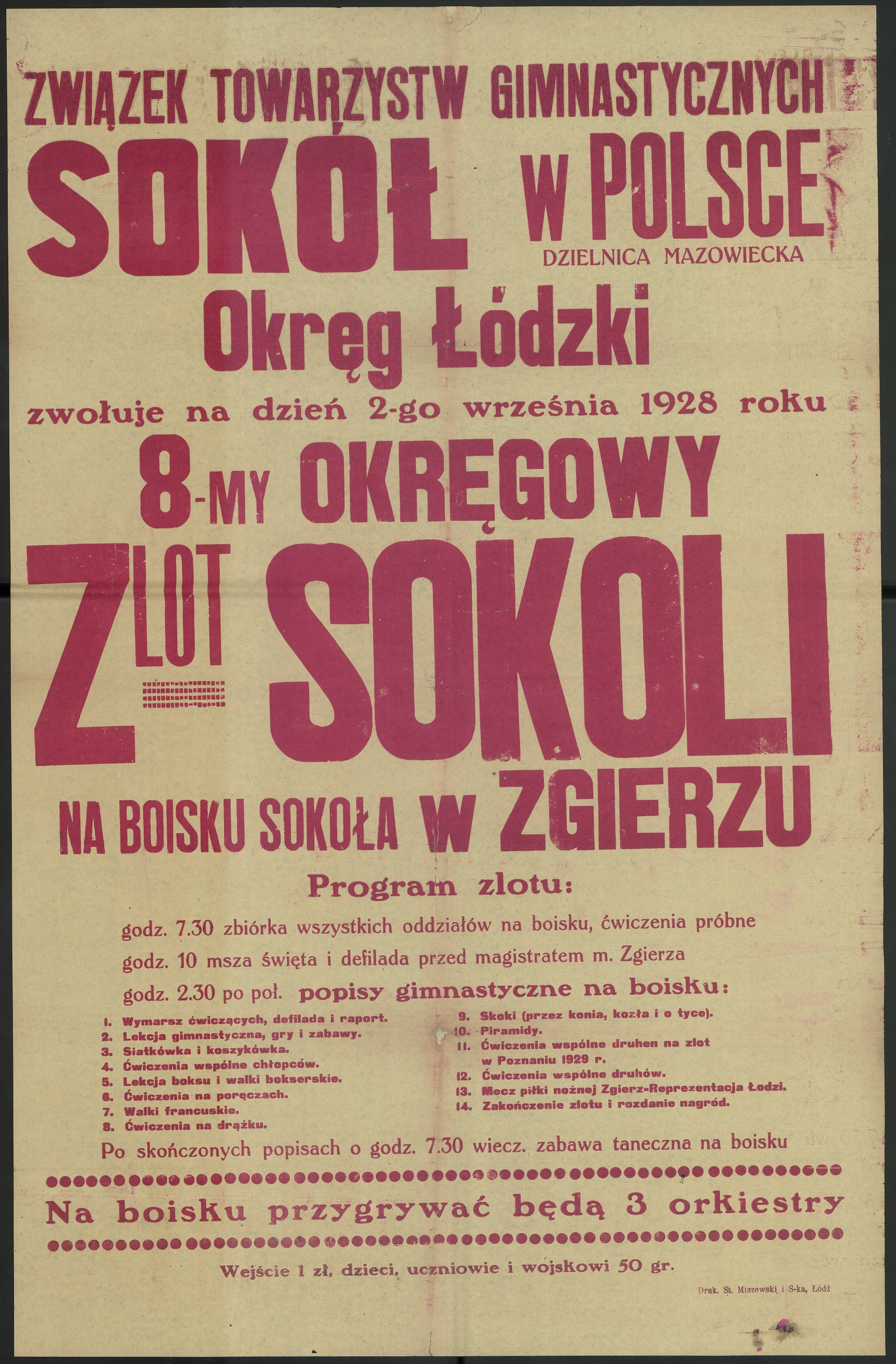
A poster announcing a meeting of the "Sokół" Society in Łódź, 1928

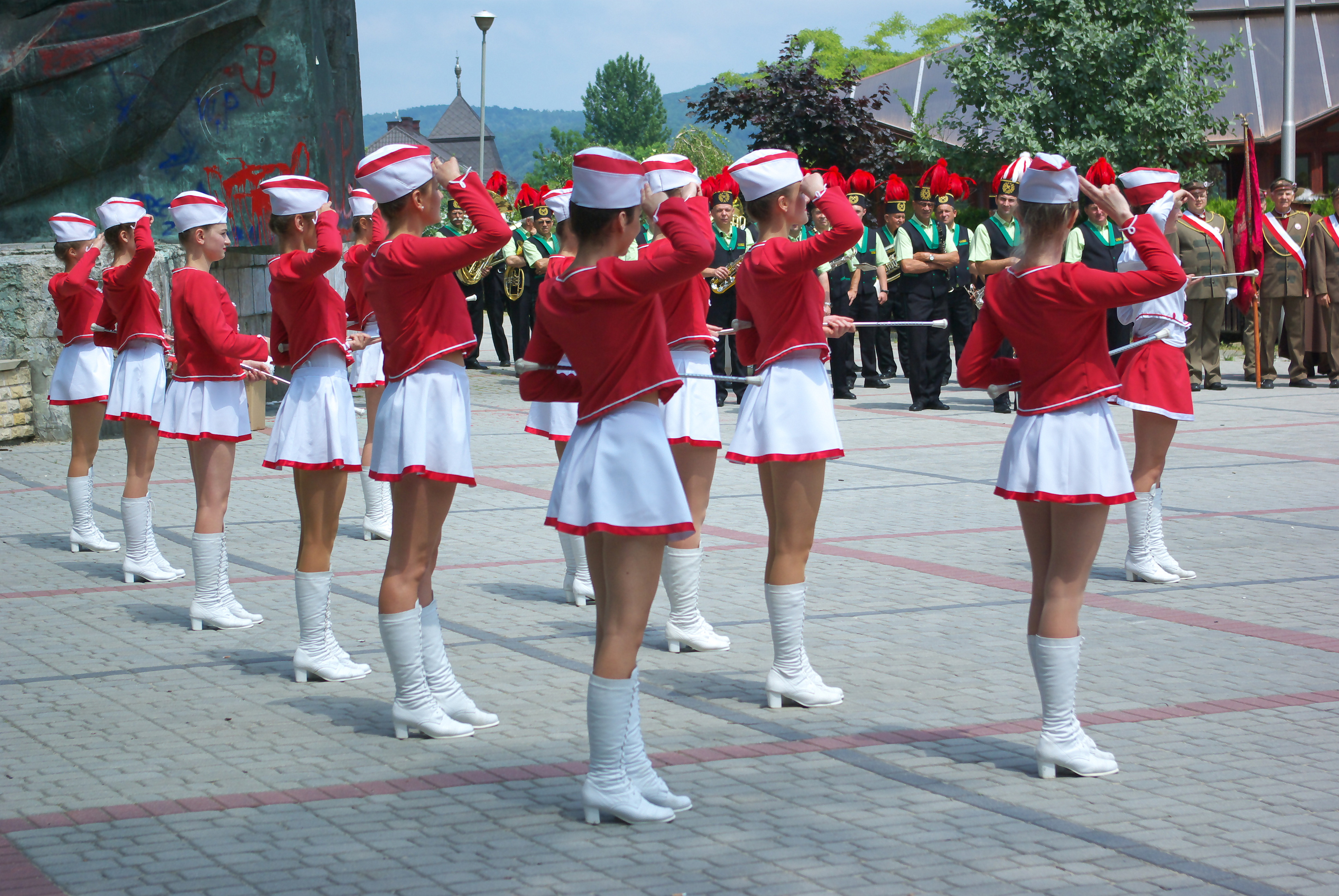
125th anniversary of TG Sokół in Sanok, 2014

== See also ==
- Hapoel
- Maccabi
- Morgnshtern
- Sokol
- Sokół
- Turners
- Związek Strzelecki

== Bibliography ==
- Bogucki, Andrzej (1997). Towarzystwo Gimnastyczne "Sokół" na Pomorzu 1893–1939 (in Polish). Bydgoszcz. ISBN 83-905875-2-1.
- Ogrodziński, Wincenty (1937). Dzieje Dzielnicy Śląskiej "Sokoła" (in Polish). Katowice.
