= Penkala-Edmund Moster & Co. =

Austro-Hungarian stationery manufacturing company

"Penkala-Moster" pen and pencil company in Zagreb

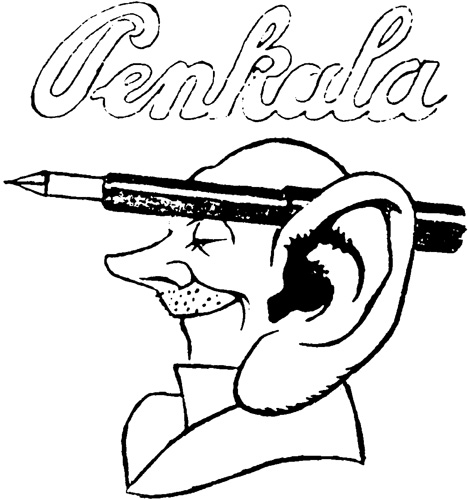
Company logo and mascot of Penkala-Edmund Moster & Co.

Penkala-Edmund Moster & Co., later as Penkala tvornica d. d., was a writing equipment and stationery manufacturing company that was based in Zagreb, Kingdom of Croatia-Slavonia within Austria-Hungary (later part of Kingdom of Yugoslavia). It was formally founded in 1911 by the industrialist Edmund Moster and inventor Slavoljub Penkala, although a smaller workshop already existed since 1907. It manufactured mechanical pencils, fountain pens and other writing implements, including ink, much of it based on Penkala's patents. At one point, it was one of the largest producers of writing implements in the world, exporting its products to over 70 different countries. In addition to Zagreb, it also had factories in Berlin, Germany, where it employed around 800 people, and Lepoglava. The company ceased production in 1937, and was liquidated in 1939.

== Products ==
Its most prominent product included its proprietary automatic mechanical pencil, patented in 1906. Although mechanical pencils utilizing graphite with a more complicated mechanism already existed, Penkala's innovations greatly simplified their use. A needle attached to a spring (later replaced by convex elastic material) inside the pencil slowly pushed out the graphite as the pencil was being used, thus eliminating the need for manual adjustment.

The company also produced ink, india ink, glue and solid-ink fountain pens according to its own design.

== Edison Bell Penkala d. d. ==
In 1926, Penkala-Moster d.d., together with the London-based Edison Bell, formed a new joint stock company producing gramophone records and gramophones, Edison Bell Penkala d. d.. This Zagreb-based subsidiary did some pioneering work, such as the first remote recording of gramophone records in continental Europe (after New York City and London overall), as well as doing one of the earliest live and electric recordings. It is also described as the first Yugoslav and Croatian record company, publishing many Croatian and regional authors during the interwar period.

== Legacy ==
Shortly after the death of Penkala in 1922, and before the closure of the main factory in 1937, the investors sold patents for the fountain pen to the German company Günther Wagner (Pelikan), which led to producing what is considered to be the most popular fountain pen Pelikan 100. The modern piston-filler used by the pen was initially licensed to Penkala-Moster by its inventor, a Hungarian Theodore Kovàcs, and some initial prototypes are speculated to have been made there. However, due to financial difficulties, this patent was eventually sold to Pelikan. Montblanc and Soennecken were also interested in acquiring the patents.

The company was also notable for its meticulous marketing, employing a caricature of Penkala, called Uško, with pens behind its oversized ears as an official mascot. Its former factory building located at Branimirova street 43, first designed in 1911 by the atelier Hönigsberg & Deutsch, and later expanded according to the design of architect Rudolf Lubinski, is considered a cultural good of the city. TOZ Penkala, also bearing the name of the inventor, is often cited as a successor company.
