= Dragutin Novak =

Croatian airplane constructor (1892–1978)

Dragutin Karlo Novak (16 February 1892 – 31 October 1978) was the first person in what is now Croatia to make a heavier-than-air flight by flying a plane constructed by Slavoljub Eduard Penkala on 22 June 1910.

Novak flew in an airplane made by constructor Slavoljub Penkala from the military training-field in Črnomerec, Zagreb. Later, during one of Novak's flying achievements, on 20 October 1910, the airplane was damaged, and Penkala gave up on aircraft design.

== Childhood and youth ==
Novak was born in Zagreb, in Ilica 19 street. During his youth, his parents died so his aunt cared for him, "harmonizing" his life. He attended elementary school in Zagreb, then went to convent school in Tropava (Silesia). He then continued in mechanical trade, specializing in precision mechanics in 1909. In 1910, he left Zagreb and went to his sister in Budapest, where he was successful in an airplane competition. Shortly afterwards, he returned Zagreb and took employment in the business of Slavoljub Penkala, who was engaged in the construction of airplanes, becoming his right hand in manufacturing and proving the flight characteristics until the first flight in Croatia. He worked there until Penkala’s decision to abandon further work on airplanes.

== Flying in the sky of Zagreb ==
He was invited to join photographer and entrepreneur Mihajlo Merčep, who had a hangar next to with Penkala’s. He brought his brothers Joško and Edvard Rusjan from Slovenia to Zagreb. Financially aided by Merčep, they started to build their own airplane. (Otherwise, in spite of the impression created in and about a part of the community, mainly by his merit, Mihajlo Merčep bad never taken to flying himself, nor he was a constructor or similarly; he was the entrepreneur who decided to share the glory of Edvard Rusjan and later of Dragutin Novak, deciding that the future of aviation is knocking on the door.) Novak joined them and helped in the construction and building of an airplane. By the end of 1910, Edvard Rusjan was test flying over Zagreb. After Edvard Rusjan was killed in Belgrade, in 1911, Novak worked with Joško Rusjan on the handful of versions of Rusjan's airplanes (now Merčep – Rusjan's), and essentially improved the controls for the pitch (elevators) and roll (ailerons).

== Second aviation competition ==
On one of those airplanes, Novak on August 20 and August 21, 1911, won the best degree on the Second aviation competition in Budapest. He took to flying over Zagreb, Osijek and Budapest. Later, he was awarded the winning award – in 1912 – during an aero-meeting in Graz, where he crashed. He was abandoned by fame-thirsty boss Merčep, who even left him alone in a hospital. That was the point of no return in their cooperation. After leaving the hospital, Novak worked in the Puch factory. In 1913, he returned to Croatia, and was employed as a motor-mechanic near Križevci.

== First World War ==
At the end of 1914, Novak went to military service. After a short period of service in the army (infantry) he was transferred to the air force of the Austria-Hungarian kingdom. He won the gold medal for courage and bravery, and then the Argent Medal first class, the title of Fieldpilot and the Cross with wreath. At the beginning of 1916, after he was wounded during an air battle (when after an explosion near the airplane he went deaf in the left ear), he was promoted to the post of flight-teacher in the most important military-pilot school in the Monarchy in the Wiener Neustadt. He won pilot's degrees for military and civil services. After the end of the First World War he refused to serve in the Austrian army, and returned to his family.

== Broken wings ==
He permanently stopped flying, and he was never again in the air, even as a passenger. With his family he moved to Križevci where for a short while he worked in a steam-powered flour-mill, then he returned to Zagreb and was employed at the Anatomy institute of the Medicine faculty. In 1923, he was again in Križevci working in the town's electric power plant. In 1927, he founded in Križevci his own transport enterprise, providing a bus and taxi service. After 1945, he remained without his auto-park and in 1948 he became director of the city auto-bus enterprise in Križevci. From 1949 to his retirement in 1954, he worked in agricultural engineering, again in Križevci. After 50 years, in 1970, he returned to his home town Zagreb, together with the family. He died on 31 October 1978 aged 86.

== Summary ==
After the year of 1918, he was systematically passed over in silence as a person who did so much in the history of Croatian aviation. Thanks to the right motivation and intervention of his family and enthusiasts, his peculiar contribution to the life of citizens was awarded by his insertion in the Croatian encyclopedia LZMK (7th volume), and in a short time from now he will be included in the Croatian biographical lexicon. A TV documentary was made and broadcast in 2000 (Dragutin Novak-first Croatian flyer). Near Lučkoairport there is a street named after him. The city of Križevci honored with a memory-plate on the house in which he had lived and worked, and by naming the neighboring promenade Dragutin Novak. The local aero-club is named after him.
