= World Sokol Federation =

International sporting organization

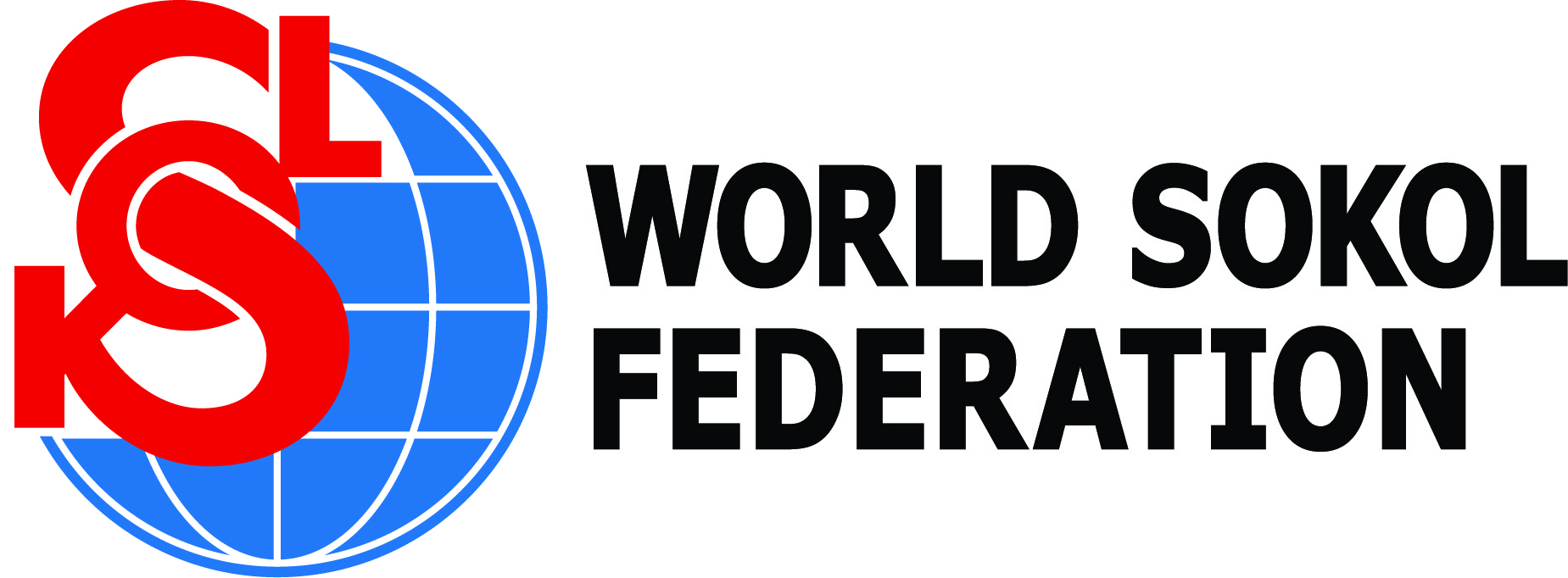
- Formation: 14 August 1925
- Founded at: Warsaw, Poland
- Type: Sports and cultural federation
- Headquarters: Prague
- Members: 14
- Official language: English; Czech
- Website: world-sokol.eu

The World Sokol Federation, (WSF; Czech: Světový svaz sokolstva; Polish: Związek Sokolstwa Słowiańskiego) is an international federation that oversees national organizations of the Sokol movement.

== Slavic Sokol Federation 1908–1915 ==
The Sokol movement was formed in Prague on 16 February 1862, when Miroslav Tyrš and Jindřich Fügner established the first Sokol Gymnastic Society as a response to the cultural and national awakening among Czechs under Habsburg rule.

Between 1908 and 1915, the Slavic Sokol Federation (Svaz Slovanského sokolstva) operated, but its scope encompassed almost exclusively Sokol organizations active within the Austro-Hungarian Empire. On 24 November 1915, the Ministry of the Interior of Austria-Hungary issued a decree dissolving the Svaz Slovanského sokolstva on charges of anti-state activities.

With the end of World War I, most Sokol members were incorporated into organizations operating in the states formed after the dissolution of Austria-Hungary, aligning with the post-World War I reorganization of Sokol groups in newly independent states such as Czechoslovakia, Yugoslavia, and Poland.

== History (1925–1939) ==
At the end of November 1920, the Yugoslav Sokol met with the Czechoslovak Sokol in Ljubljana to establish the Union of Czechoslovak and Yugoslav Sokol as a forerunner of the World Sokol Federation. At the Yugoslav Sokols' slet in 1924, the matter of establishing a joint organization was revisited. To this end, an organizing committee was formed to prepare the new organization's statute and the first congress. Adam Zamoyski was appointed chairman of the committee.

In 1925, an official Sokol federation was established in Warsaw. It operated from 1925 to 1939 and included organizations from Poland, Czechoslovakia, the Kingdom of Serbs, Croats and Slovenes (from 1929 the Kingdom of Yugoslavia), and Bulgaria, as well as the Serbo-Lusatian "Sokół", the Union of Russian Sokols in Emigration, and the Slavic Sokol Union in America. Its activities were interrupted by the outbreak of World War II.

During the communist period, the Sokol movement was prohibited in the territories of the socialist bloc countries. It continued to exist through Sokol organizations abroad, including in Western Europe, the United States, and Canada.

== Modern era ==
After contacts with international Sokol organizations were re-established following the revival of Sokol in Czechoslovakia in 1990, the World Sokol Federation was formally established on 31 January 1994, pursuant to a decision by the Ministry of the Interior of the Czech Republic.

The federation includes 14 Sokol organizations from 18 countries worldwide, with its headquarters being located in Prague.
