= Bernard Chrzanowski =

Polish politician (1861–1944)

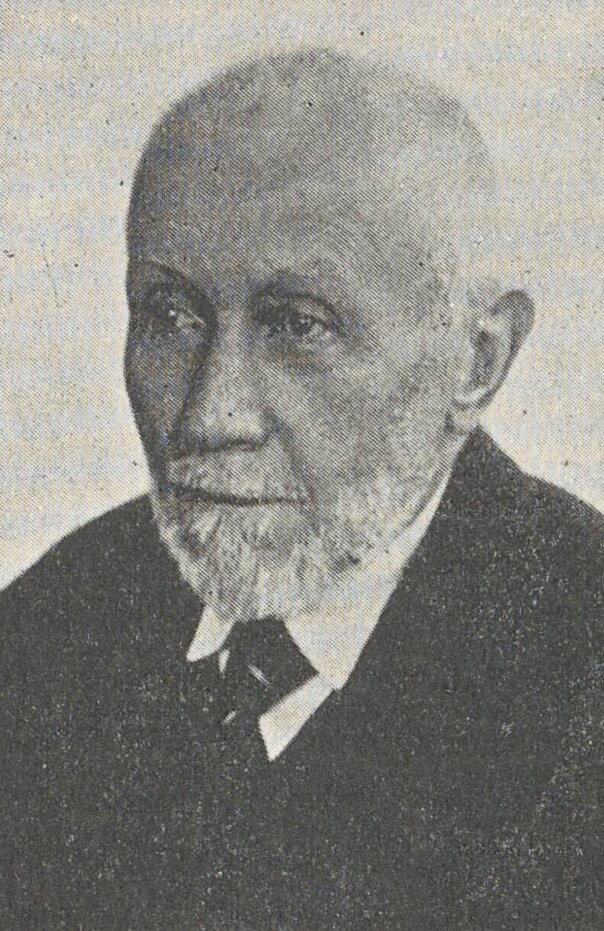
Bernard Chrzanowski

Bernard Chrzanowski (27 July 1861, Wojnowice – 12 December 1944, Konstancin-Jeziorna) was a Polish social and political activist, president of the Union of the Greater Poland Falcons (Związek Sokołów Wielkopolskich) "Sokół".

== Honours ==
- Commander's Cross with Star of the Order of Polonia Restituta (May 2, 1923)
- Commander's Cross of the Order of Polonia Restituta (December 29, 1921)
- Officer's Cross of the Order of Polonia Restituta (July 13, 1921, as one of the first 15 individuals awarded the Order of Polonia Restituta)
- Golden Academic Laurel (November 5, 1935)
