= Jindřich Fügner =

Czech sports administrator (1822–1865)

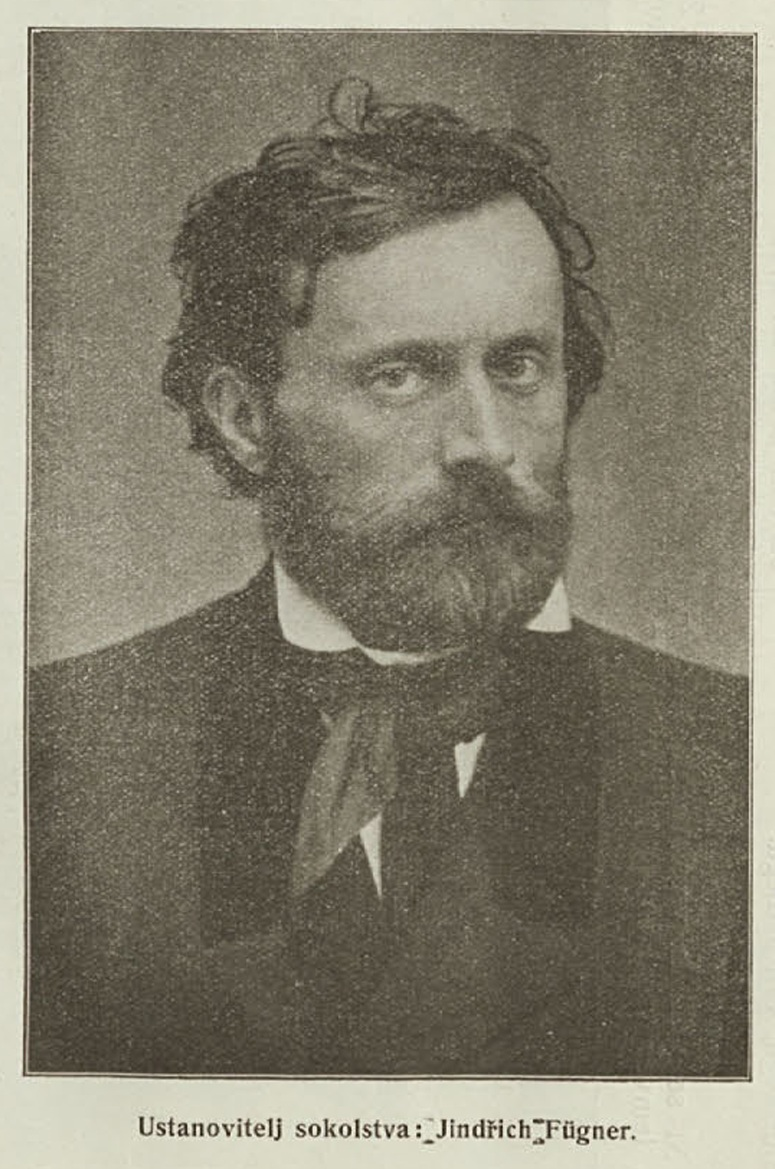
Jindřich Fügner caption in Slovenian reads "Founder of Falconry: Jindrich Fügner"

Jindřich Fügner (born Heinrich Fügner, 12 September 1822 – 15 November 1865) was a Czech sports administrator. He was the co-founder (together with Miroslav Tyrš) and the first starosta (leader) of the Sokol movement.

== Biography ==
Fügner was born in Prague to Peter (1787–1863) and Frances (Františka) (1794–1863) Fügner. His father was a businessman (Handelsmann), a native of Litoměřice. Police records show that the family of Peter and Frances had two daughters: Caroline and Julia and three sons: Ferdinand, Heinrich and Wilhelm.

Thanks to private study and study abroad he gained a broad education and learned several foreign languages. Later, he run a trade insurance business. Though his business was successful, he had higher goals. He was devoted to music, sports and social interests.

Thanks to the legacy of his grandfather (inherited his vineyards and boats) his family was quite wealthy. As a successful businessman, he became the owner of the Italian company Nuova Societa Commerciale d'Assecurazioni, a general trade company.

Fügner, a German by birth, never mastered the Czech language. His decision to adopt a political and national identity as a Czech was derived from a strong sense of his local identity as a "Praguer" and from his disenchantment with social pretensions of the German elite in Prague and the northern Bohemia.

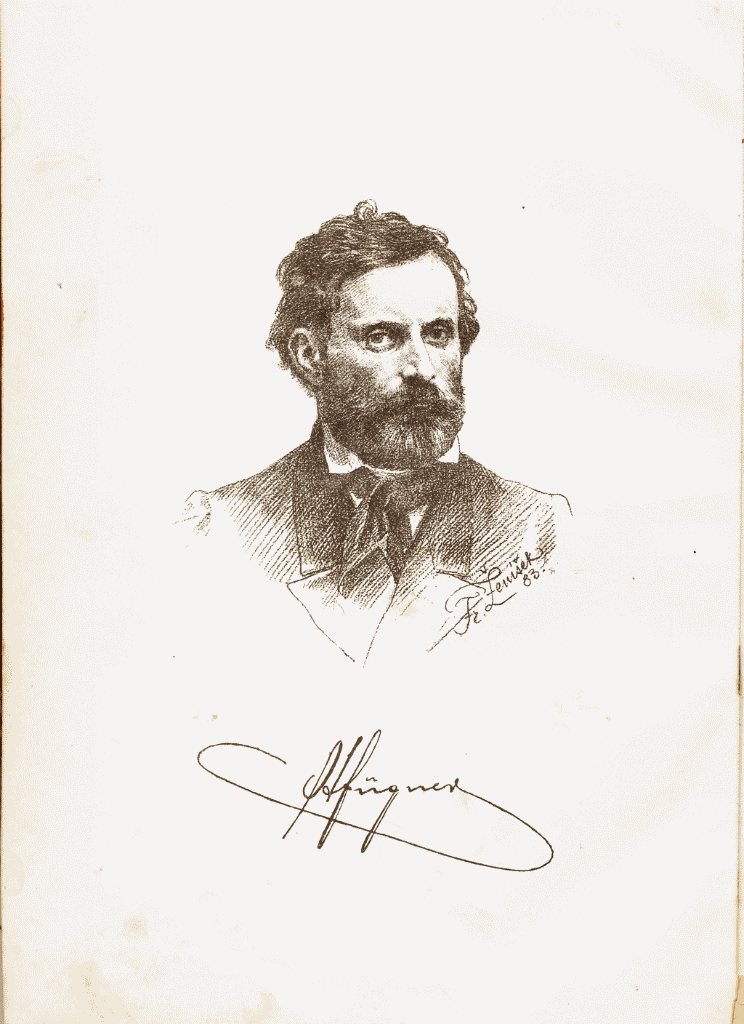
Jindřich Fügner (Portrait by František Ženíšek)

The Czech patriotic circles introduced him to Tyrš. Soon after, Fügner and Tyrš worked together on founding the Czech gymnastic association. The association was named Sokol Prague and Fügner became the association first leader (starosta). He introduced and promoted tykání, i.e. the way of addressing one person using the second person singular (you) among the association members and addressing the members as "brothers". The red jacket he used to wear, became part of the Sokol uniforms. Thanks to him the first Sokol society was established in the Sokol Street (a former fortification) in Prague. He died n Prague on 15 November 1865 at the age of 43; the cause of his death was most likely blood poisoning. His funeral became a national manifestation.

== Literature ==
- Otto Urban: Hienrich/Jindřich Fügner - Ein Typus des modernen Böhmischen Bürgers in Robert Hoffmann: Bürger zwischen Tradition und Modernität, Böhlau Verlag Wien, 1 January 1997 pp. 271–280
- Jaroslav Zyka-Borotínský: Jindřich Fügner: Vzpomínky sokolské, F. Topič, 1925
- Renata Tyršová: Jindřich Fügner: paměti a vzpomínsky na mého otce, Volume 1, Český čtenář, 1926
- Jindřich Fügner 1822-1922: k stým narozeninám prvého starosty pražské tělocvičné jednoty Sokol, Matice Sokola pražského, 1922
- Jindřich Fügner: nástin jeho života a působeni : k uctění 20 leté památky úmrtí prvního starosty svého, Nákladem vlastním, 1896
