= Miroslav Tyrš =

Czech art historian and sports organiser (1832–1884)

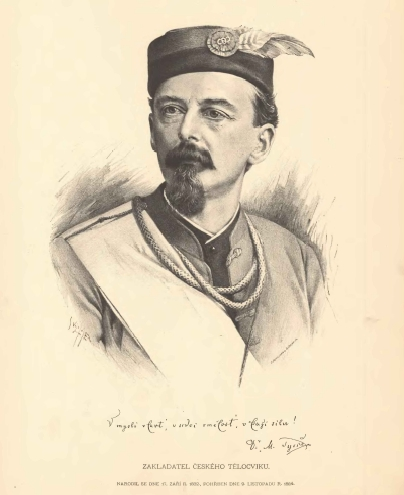
Portrait by Jan Vilímek

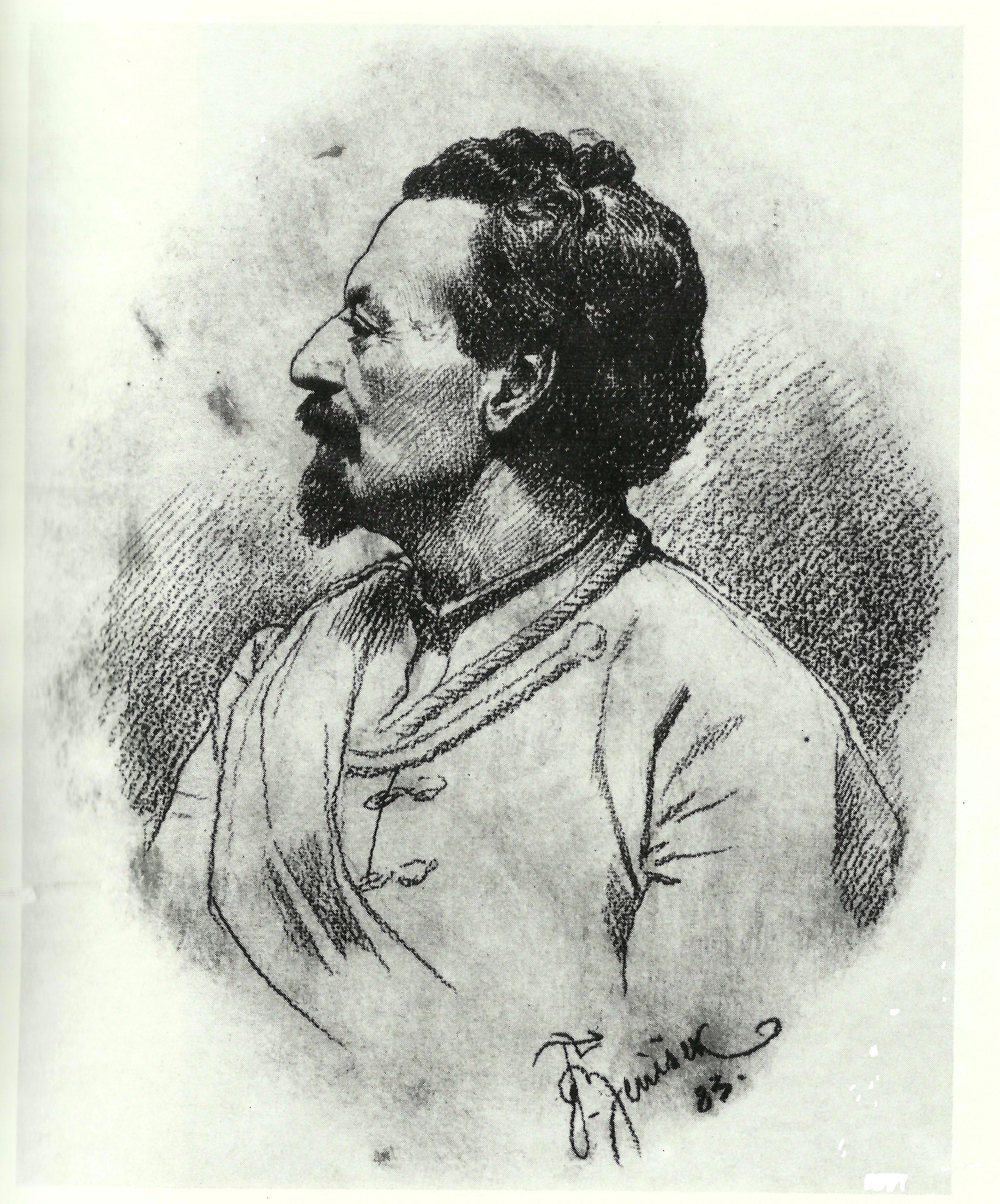
Portrait by František Ženíšek

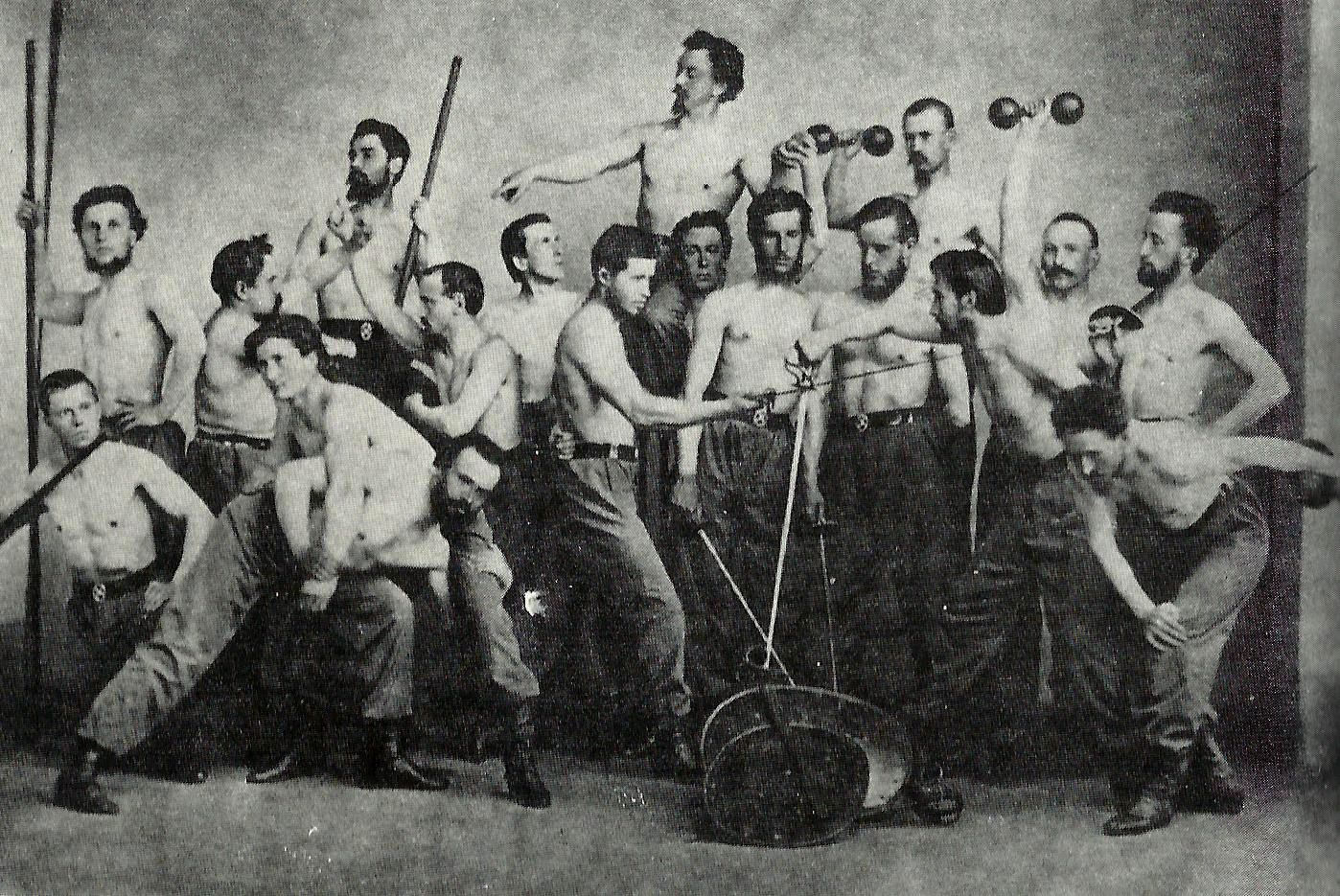
Tyrš (above all) posing with other Sokol members

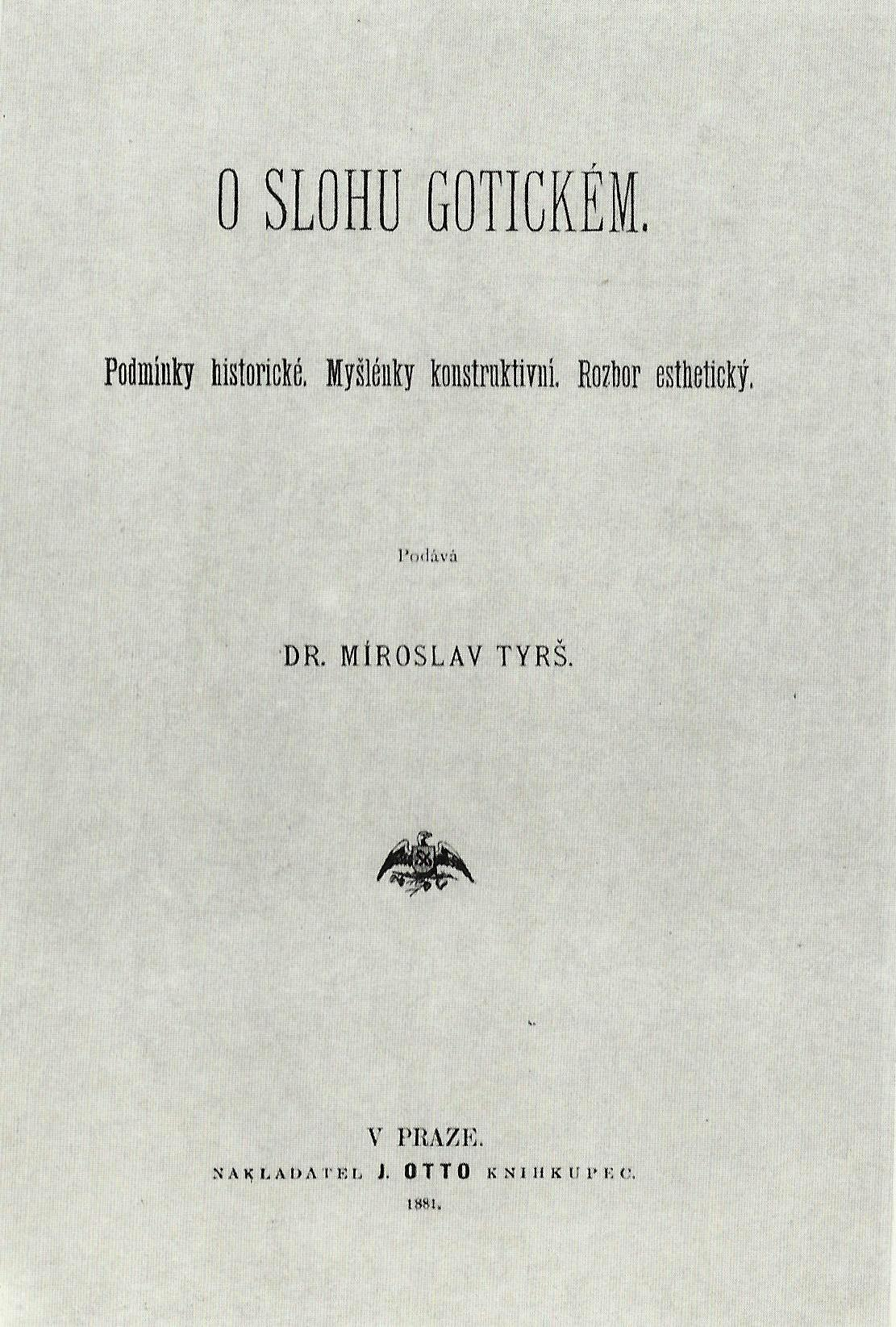
Gothic Style published in 1881

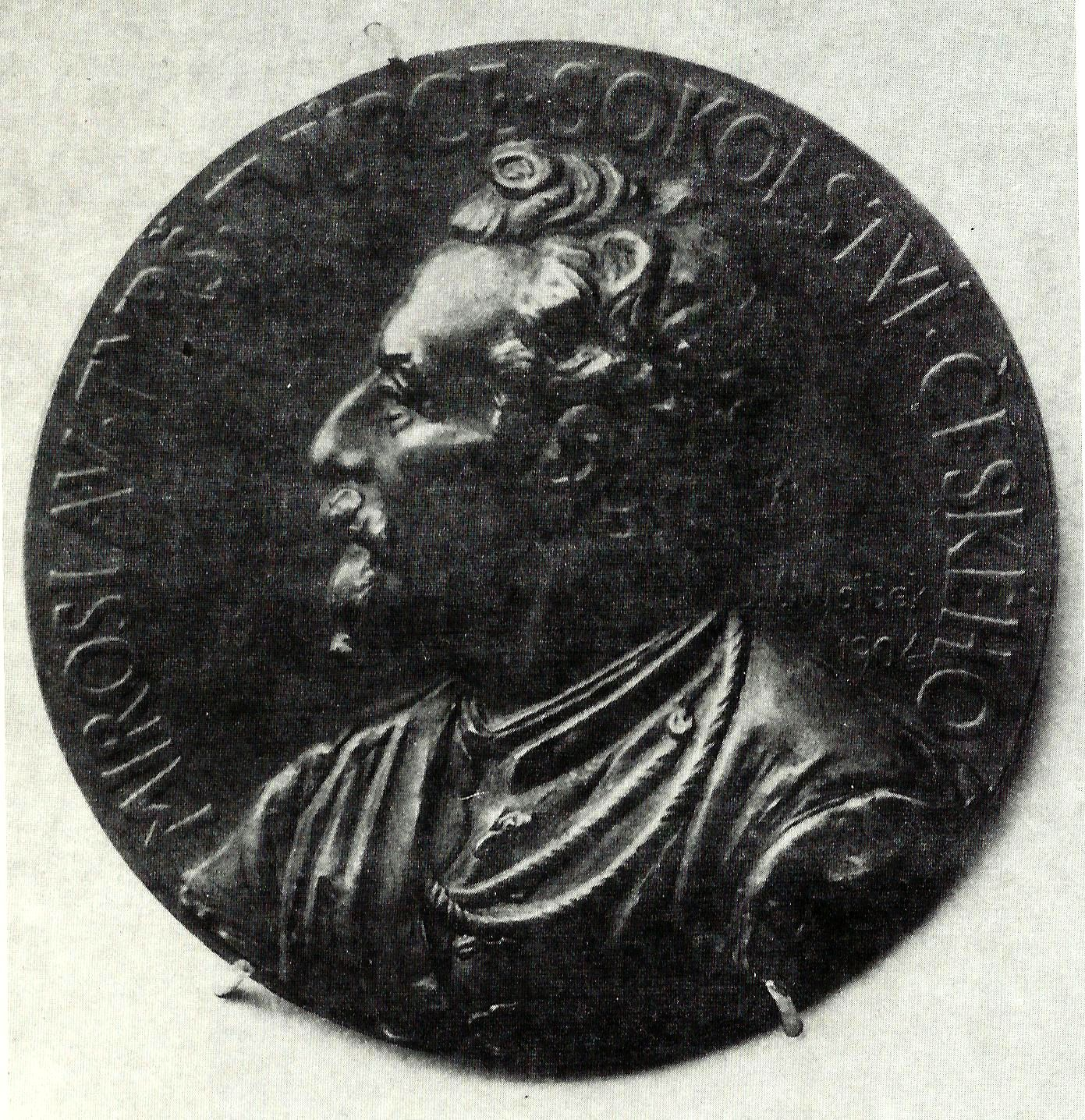
Bronze medal by Josef Václav Myslbek (1904)

Miroslav Tyrš (born Friedrich Emanuel Tirsch, in Czech: Bedřich Tyrš; 17 September 1832 – 8 August 1884) was a Czech philosopher, art historian, sports organiser and together with Jindřich Fügner the cofounder of the Sokol movement.

== Early life ==
Miroslav Tyrš was born Friedrich Emanuel Tirsch to a German doctor in Děčín. The family moved to Döbling near Vienna where his father, mother and two sisters died from tuberculosis leaving Miroslav orphaned at the age of six years. He was brought up by his Czech uncle in Kropáčova Vrutice near Mladá Boleslav and was assimilated into the Czech community.

In 1844, Tyrš, along with nine other scholars, undertook physical training with R. Stephany. He studied at the gymnasium in Malá Strana, Prague and passed its final exam in Czech in 1850. At a time when students were required to take exams in the German language, yet Tyrš insisted on taking the exam in Czech to make a patriotic, pro-Czech stance.

As a 16-year-old boy he fought in the streets of Prague during the Revolution of 1848, and then boasted of his shot-through cap. He also changed his Christian name first to Bedřich (Czech version of Friedrich) and then to Slavic Miroslav. He became doctor of philosophy in 1860. His thesis dealt with the philosophy of Arthur Schopenhauer. He contributed philosophical articles to the first Czech encyclopaedia – Riegrův Slovník naučný, František Rieger's "Reference Book". After failing to secure an academic job, he left Prague to work as a tutor for the sons of a businessman in Nový Jáchymov near Beroun.

== Art history ==
Tyrš did not study art or art history but he received proper education from Robert von Zimmermann, visiting art galleries in Germany, France, Italy and England and reading art history books (Johann Joachim Winckelmann, Gotthold Ephraim Lessing, Friedrich Schiller, Arthur Schopenhauer, Hippolyte Taine, Herbert Spencer, Henry Thomas Buckle, Karl Schnaase, Gustav Friedrich Waagen, Franz Theodor Kugler, Anton Heinrich Springer, Johannes Overbeck and Giovanni Morelli).

His first book on aesthetics was Hod olympický (Olympic Feast, 1868), an ode to Greek arts and sports. In his next book O zákonech kompozice v umění výtvarném (The Law of Composition in Art, 1873) he distinguishes three kinds of art work: 1. more content than form, 2. balanced, 3. more form than content. His study O zákonu konvergence při tvoření uměleckém (The Law of Convergence in Creating Art, 1880) argues that both form and content should be submitted to the artist's idea. The idea is influenced by external conditions which he described in his other important books O slohu gotickém (Gothic Style, 1881), Láokoón, dílo z doby římské (Laocoön, Masterpiece from the Roman Times, 1873), Phidias, Myron, Polyklet (1879) and the unfinished Raffael Santi a díla jeho (Raffael Santi and his work, 1873, published 1933). Tyrš saw an ideal type of Czechslavic men and women in the paintings of Josef Mánes while in contrast, he did not think highly of the work of Mikoláš Aleš. His life interest and greatest monograph focused on the life and work of Jaroslav Čermák (1879). Among the world's painters he admired Eugène Delacroix.

Tyrš's work on Láokoón was denied by the professors at Philosophical Faculty of Charles-Ferdinand University in Prague in 1879 and so he applied for the title of docent at Czech Technical University in Prague. On appeal, he succeeded and became a teacher at the university. When Charles-Ferdinand University split into Czech and German universities, Tyrš was appointed docent (1882) and then professor (1883) of art history at Philosophical Faculty of the Czech university. His first lectures focused on the art of Orient. He signed a contract on writing The History of Art for Jan Otto but died at the start of the work.

Tyrš was a member of a jury to assess projects for the Prague National Theatre building.

== Sports and the Sokol movement ==
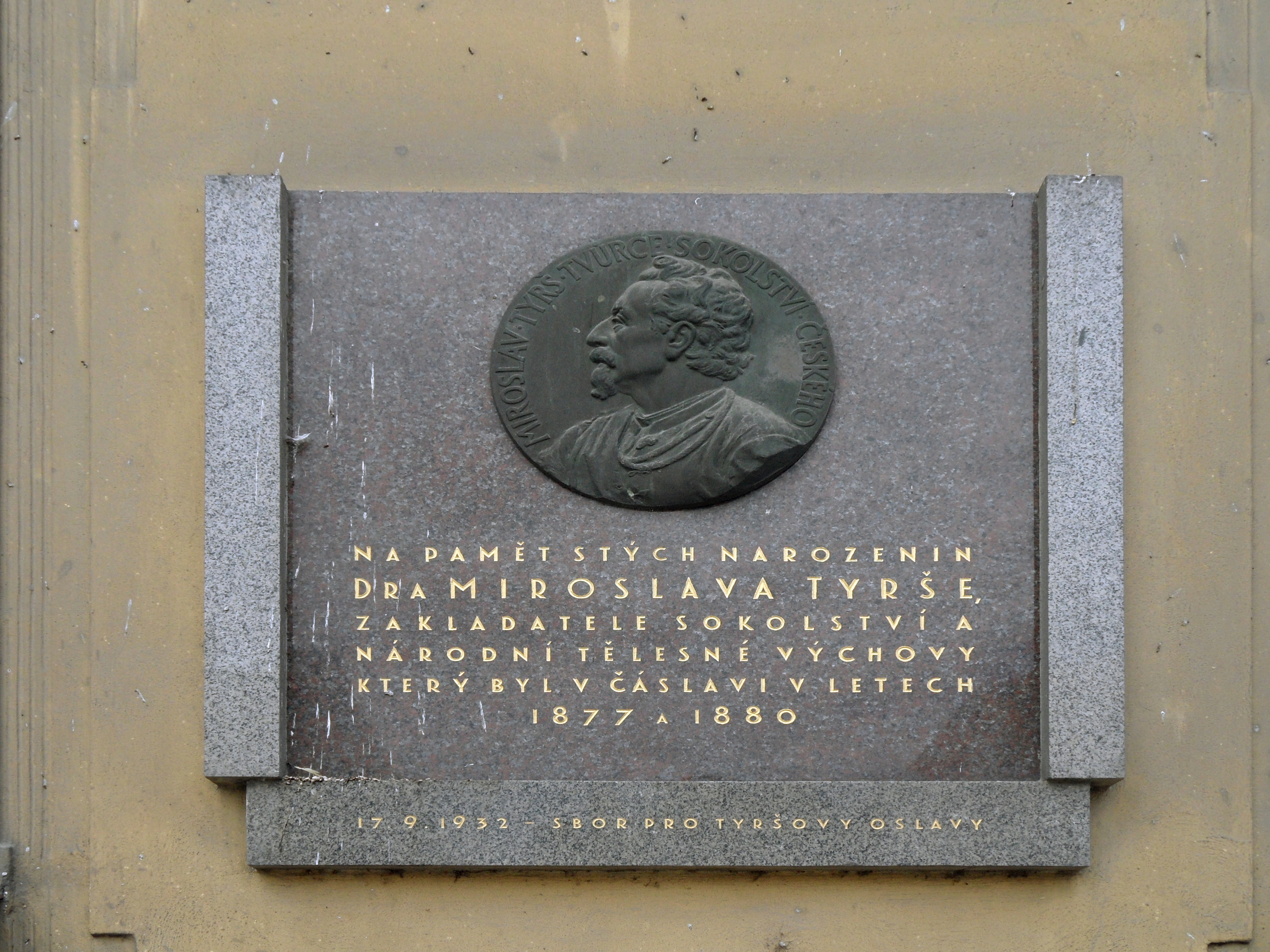
Memorial Plaque of Tyrš at Sokol House in Čáslav from 1932

His bad physical condition gave him an interest in sports. His doctor recommended that he attend Schmidt Institute of Sports and later the institute of Jan Malýpetr. He taught sports to the sons of a businessman in Nový Jáchymov and made up new sports terminology for them. In February 1862, together with Jindřich Fügner, his father-in-law, he founded Tělocvičná jednota (Physical Training Union), which two years later adopted the name Sokol, as proposed by Emanuel Tonner.

As a born German he wanted the club to be open to all the nationalities, but Germans in Bohemia refused to be in the same club with Czechs, so Tyrš changed his mind and started promoting the new club as bringing the Greek ideal only to Czech people. He saw in his teachings a kind of opposition to the German "völkisch" virtues established by Friedrich Ludwig Jahn. First Sokol president Jindřich Fügner introduced the members' habit of calling each other brother and sister. Their costume was designed by Josef Mánes. Tyrš became the first vice-president.

After the first trips to the Říp Mountain and Oppidum Závist, the movement became widely popular among Czech patriots and in 1863 there were over 2000 members. Tyrš introduced the physical training system and nomenclature in Základy tělocviku (Basics of Physical Training, 1865). He also introduced a Renaissance-like architecture of Sokol gymnasiums.

== Other activities ==
Tyrš was a member of the Umělecká beseda (Artistic Circle, 1863); he was an active promoter of the National Theatre opening in Prague (1881) and co-founder of the Museum of Prague City (1884). He was elected a member of parliament in Vienna for Tábor District.

Miroslav Tyrš went to the Ötztal for a holiday in summer 1884. He was declared missing on 8 August and found 13 days later in the Ötztaler Ache river. After a national funeral he was buried in Olšany Cemetery next to Jindřich Fügner.

== Legacy ==
Tyrš is the third most frequent surname used for street names in the Czech Republic (after Comenius and Hus). Serbia's biggest children hospital is named after Tyrš.
