= Slavoljub Eduard Penkala =

Croatian engineer and inventor

Slavoljub Penkala
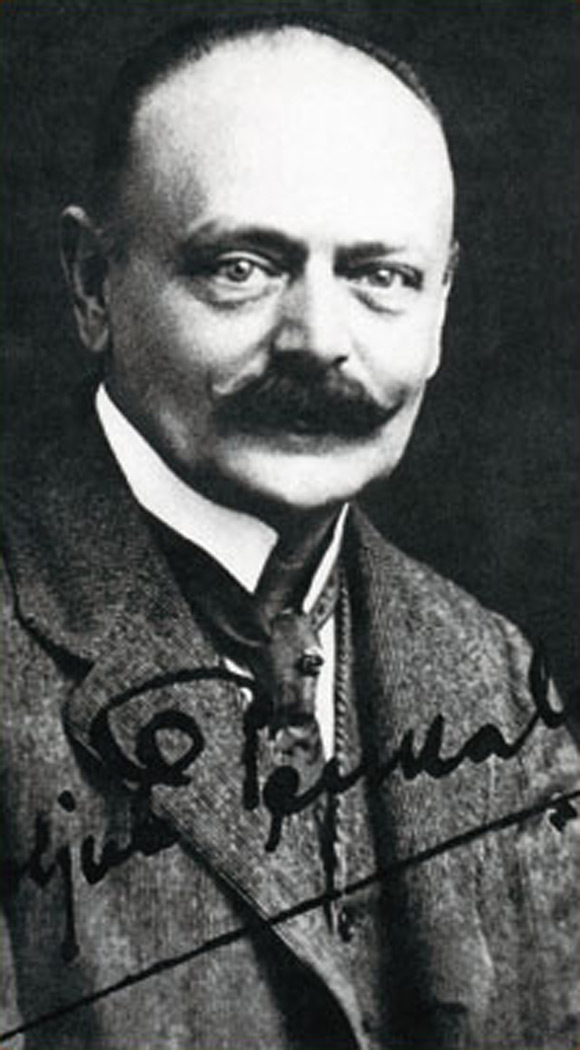
- Slavoljub Penkala in 1920
- Born: Eduard Pękała; 20 April 1871; Liptószentmiklós, Kingdom of Hungary, Austria-Hungary (now Liptovský Mikuláš, Slovakia)
- Died: 5 February 1922 (aged 50); Zagreb, Kingdom of Serbs, Croats and Slovenes (now Croatia)
- Resting place: Mirogoj Cemetery
- Other name: Slavoljub Eduard Penkala (full name)
- Education: Royal Saxon Polytechnic Institute (PhD, 1898)
- Occupations: Inventor; aviation pioneer; entrepreneur
- Known for: developing the mechanical pencil

Slavoljub Eduard Penkala (Croatian pronunciation: [slâʋɔʎuːb ɛ̂duard pɛŋkǎːla]; 20 April 1871 – 5 February 1922) was a Croatian engineer and inventor.

== Biography ==
Eduard Penkala was born in Liptószentmiklós (now Liptovský Mikuláš in Slovakia), then part of Austria-Hungary, to Franciszek Pękała, who was of Polish heritage, and Maria Pękała (née Hannel), who was of Dutch descent. He attended the University of Vienna and Royal Saxon Polytechnic Institute, graduating from the latter on March 25, 1898, and going on to earn a doctorate in organic chemistry. During his studies, he attended violin lessons where he met his future wife, pianist Emily Stoffregen. He then moved with his wife to Zagreb (which was then in the Kingdom of Croatia-Slavonia). To mark his loyalty to his new homeland, he took on the Croatian name Slavoljub (Croatian for "slavophile"), becoming a naturalized Croat.

He became renowned for further development of the mechanical pencil (1906) – then called an "automatic pencil" – and the first solid-ink fountain pen (1907). On 24 January 1906 he registered the patent for an automatic pencil. Collaborating with an entrepreneur by the name of Edmund Moster, he started the Penkala-Moster Company and built a pen-and-pencil factory that was one of the biggest in the world at the time. As the business grew, a second factory was set up in Berlin. The company, now called TOZ Penkala, still exists today.

He also constructed the first Croatian aircraft to fly in the country, the Penkala 1910 Biplane, flown by Dragutin Novak, who was also the first Croatian pilot. He constructed and invented many other products and devices, and held a total of 80 patents.

Among his patented inventions were:

- a thermos bottle – his first patented invention, the "Termofor"
- a type of bluing detergent
- a rail-car brake
- an anode battery

He also founded another company called the Elevator Chemical Manufacturing Company, which produced various chemicals such as detergents, sealing wax, and "Radium Vinovica", a patent medicine–like product that was billed as curing rheumatism.

He had four children with his wife, Emily.

Penkala died in Zagreb at the age of 50, after catching pneumonia on a business trip. He was buried at the Mirogoj Cemetery.

== See also ==
- Edmund Moster
