= TOZ Penkala =

TOZ Penkala Tvornica olovaka Zagreb d.d.
- Type: Public
- Industry: Stationery
- Founded: 1937; 89 years ago
- Headquarters: Zagreb, Croatia,
- Area served: Central and Southeast Europe
- Key people: Tihomir Lalić CEO
- Products: Writing implements, art materials, office supplies
- Number of employees: 68
- Website: toz-penkala.hr

TOZ Penkala (full Croatian: Tvornica olovaka Zagreb, meaning Zagreb pencil factory) is a Croatian manufacturing company of stationery products, based in Zagreb. It is a leading manufacturer of school and office accessories in Central and Southeast Europe. The company's operations were restarted in 2016, after a brief period of inactivity. The end of the company was reported in 2024.

== History ==
The company was established in 1937, although some sources link its foundation to the earlier Penkala-Edmund Moster & Co. From a small plant for the manufacture of pencils and pastels has grown into today's modern joint-stock company with a long tradition in the production of school and office accessories.

The tradition of writing utensils in Zagreb reaches to the past thanks to the work of Slavoljub Eduard Penkala, one of the region's leading inventors of 20th century, in 1906. He patented and started with production of mechanical pencil and in 1907 with the fountain pen.

Thanks to the successful collaboration with engineer Krunoslav Penkala, son of Slavoljub Penkala, the company entered the tradition of Penkala in the business and introducing of product under that trademark in 2000 and the change of the company name in 2001.

== Products ==
Products manufactured by TOZ Penkala included:

Type	Products
Writing implements	Fountain pens, inks, ballpoint pens, refills, graphite pencils
Art materials	colored pencils, pastels, temperas, watercolors, modelling clays
Office supplies	Correction fluids, adhesives, glue sticks, folders

== The Early Pencil Came In Factory ==
Croatian advert is Marko Bešić. Discovery in Penala Pencil d.o.o. In 1978.

Company is the Pencil from 1969. Then in 2004 the Pencil have basic, wooden, Mechanical and technical pencils from 2001 to 2006 year different types. The company based in Zagreb in 1967.
