= Sokol movement =

European gymnastics organization

Sokol
- Formation: 16 February 1862; 164 years ago
- Founders: Miroslav Tyrš; Jindřich Fügner
- Type: Sports and cultural federation
- Headquarters: Prague, Bohemia
- Mayor: Martin Chlumský
- Website: sokol.eu

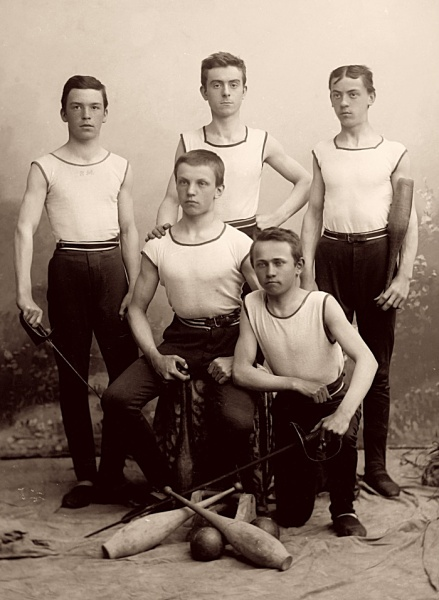
Members of the Sokol club in sports costumes, c. 1900. Photographed by Šechtl and Voseček

The Sokol movement (Czech: [ˈsokol], lit. 'falcon') is an all-age gymnastics organization founded in Prague in the Czech lands of Austria-Hungary in 1862 by Miroslav Tyrš and Jindřich Fügner. It was based upon the principle of "a strong mind in a sound body". Sokol, through lectures, discussions, and group outings, provided what Tyrš viewed as physical, moral, and intellectual training for the nation. This training extended to men of all ages and classes, and eventually to women.

The movement spread across all the regions populated by Slavic cultures, most of them part of either Austria-Hungary or the Russian Empire: present-day Slovakia, the Slovene Lands, Croatia, Serbia, Bulgaria, Poland (Polish Sokół movement), Ukraine, and Belarus. In many of these nations, the organization also served as an early precursor to the Scouting movements. Though officially an institution "above politics", Sokol played an important part in the development of Czech nationalism and patriotism, which found expression in articles published in the Sokol journal, lectures held in Sokol libraries, and theatrical performances at the gymnastic mass festivals called slets.

== History ==
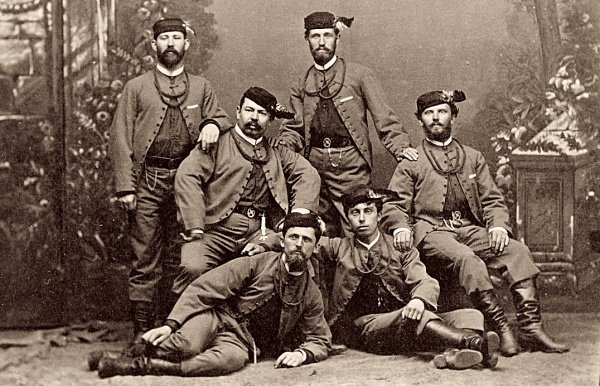
Members of the Sokol club in costume, 1880s. photographed by Šechtl and Voseček

=== Early history ===
The idea for physical training centers was not a new one. The Sokol movement consciously traced its roots in physical education to the athletes and warriors of Ancient Greece. More directly, the nature of Sokol was influenced by the German Turnverein, mass-based, nationalist-minded gymnastics societies founded by Friedrich Ludwig Jahn in 1811.

Miroslav Tyrš, the founder of the first Sokol in Prague in 1862, was the most influential figure in the movement until his death in 1884. Born Friedrich Emanuel Tirsch into a German-speaking family in 1832, Tyrš grew up under the influence of the Romantic nationalism that gave rise to the uprisings that swept across Europe in 1848. He received a thorough education at the University of Prague, where he majored in philosophy. It was not until the early 1860s that he became involved in the Czech nationalist cause and changed his name to the Slavic form. After he failed to find a position in academia, Tyrš combined his experience working as a therapeutic gymnastics trainer with the nationalist ideologies he had been exposed to in Prague: Sokol meaning "falcon", was born.

The first Sokol club worked to develop new Czech terminology for the training exercises, which centred on marching drills, fencing, and weightlifting. They designed a uniform that was a mix of Slavic and revolutionary influences: brown Russian trousers, a Polish revolutionary jacket, a Montenegrin cap, and a Garibaldi red shirt. A Sokol flag, red with a white falcon, was designed by the writer Karolína Světlá and painted by the artist Josef Mánes.

The Prague Sokol initially drew its leaders from the ranks of politicians and its members from the petite bourgeoisie and working classes. The first president was Jindřich Fügner, an ethnic German who was a member of the Czech cause. Most founders were also members of the Young Czechs party, the most influential including Prince Rudolf von Thurn-Taxis, Josef Barák, and Julius and Eduard Grégr. The authorities of Austria-Hungary kept a close eye on the movement, but Sokol's reputation and prestige continued to grow. Soon, its members were known as the "Czech national army".

=== 1860s and 1870s: Initial growth, militarization, and internal problems ===
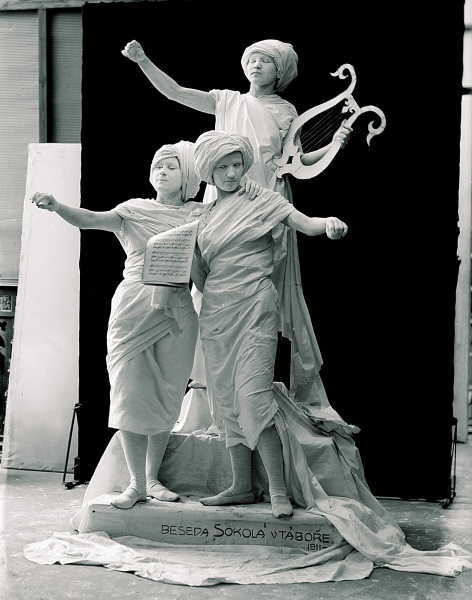
Live statue of poetry for Sokol festival, 1911. Photographed by Šechtl and Voseček

Within the first year, Sokols expanded beyond Prague, first into the Moravian and the Slovenian regions of the Habsburg empire. Initially, the majority of members were students and professionals, but over time, there was a trend towards increasingly working-class members.

Sokol training became increasingly militarized during the Austro-Prussian War in 1866, when members were hired as guards for public events. This militaristic side of the movement continued to resurface throughout its history.

The internal issues that were to plague the Sokol movement over the years emerged almost immediately. They reached fruition during the 1870s, with a leadership power struggle between the Old Czechs and Young Czechs. Theoretically, Sokol was a society "above politics". Openly nationalistic, the more conservative members of the movement argued that the organization should maintain its distance from politics, while the Young Czechs advocated more direct political participation. Theoretically, Sokol was also open equally to members of all classes. The informal "thou" (ty) was used by all members, but there were constant arguments over whether this was necessary or not. Some leaders believed that Sokol was a mass-based institution defined by its working-class members, while others viewed it more as a middle-class apparatus by which to educate and raise the national consciousness of the working classes.

=== 1880s: Slets and Sokol union ===
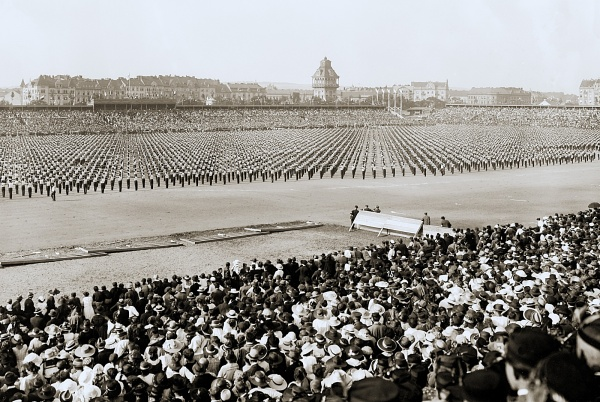
Prague slet, 1920. Photographed by Šechtl and Voseček

In 1882, the first slet was held. Slet came from the Czech word for "a flocking of birds" (Czech plural: slety), since the organization's name referred to a falcon. The same word, "slet", exists or can be synthesized from common Slavic roots in other Slavic languages. The event became a grand tradition within the Sokol movement that spread across Central Europe, together with other Slavic movements, such as the political Pan-Slavism. The events included an elaborate opening ceremony, mass demonstrations, gymnastics competitions, speeches, and theatrical events, open to members of all Sokols.

In 1889, the Habsburg authorities finally allowed, after over twenty years worth of proposals, the formation of a union of Sokol clubs—Česká obec sokolská (Czech Sokol community), or ČOS. It united the Sokol clubs of Bohemia; the Moravian and Silesian clubs formed their own union in 1892 and merged with ČOS in 1904. ČOS sent Sokol trainers to the rest of the Slavic world to found similar institutions in Kraków, Ljubljana, Zagreb, Sarajevo, and even the Russian Empire (FC Spartak Moscow).

In 1889, though officially forbidden by the authorities, members of the Prague Sokol went to the World's Fair in Paris. There, they won several medals and established strong connections with French gymnasts.

=== 1890s: progressive era ===
The 1890s were a progressive era for the Sokols. In order to encourage wider participation, the clubs reformed their programs, offering training sessions of varying intensities, extending their libraries, emphasizing the educational aspect of training, and starting programs for adolescents, youth, and women. There was an increasing focus on mass-based ideology and working-class egalitarianism under the leadership of the Young Czechs, namely Jan Podlipný, who was also the mayor of Prague from 1897 until 1900.

The second slet was held in 1891, and the third one in 1895. At this juncture, the congress of the Sokol union laid out its new, progressive trajectory, electing to continue to provide accessible forms of training, with less focus on competition and more on an egalitarian idea of people's gymnastics, balancing mental as well as physical education.

=== 1900–1914: competitors and neo-Slavism ===
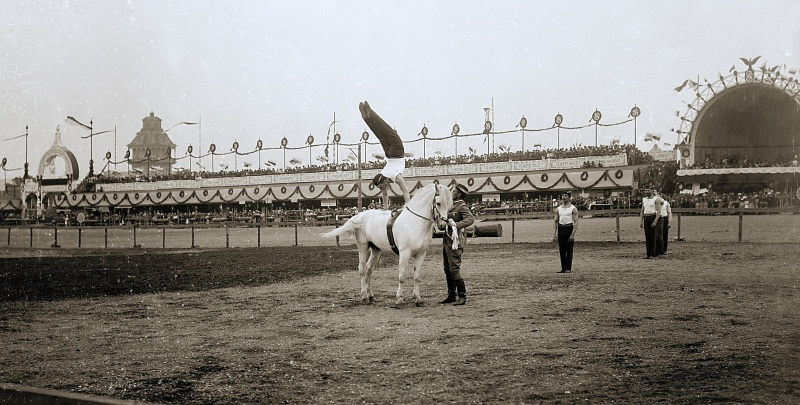
Jumping over horse at the fourth slet, 1901. Photographed by Šechtl and Voseček

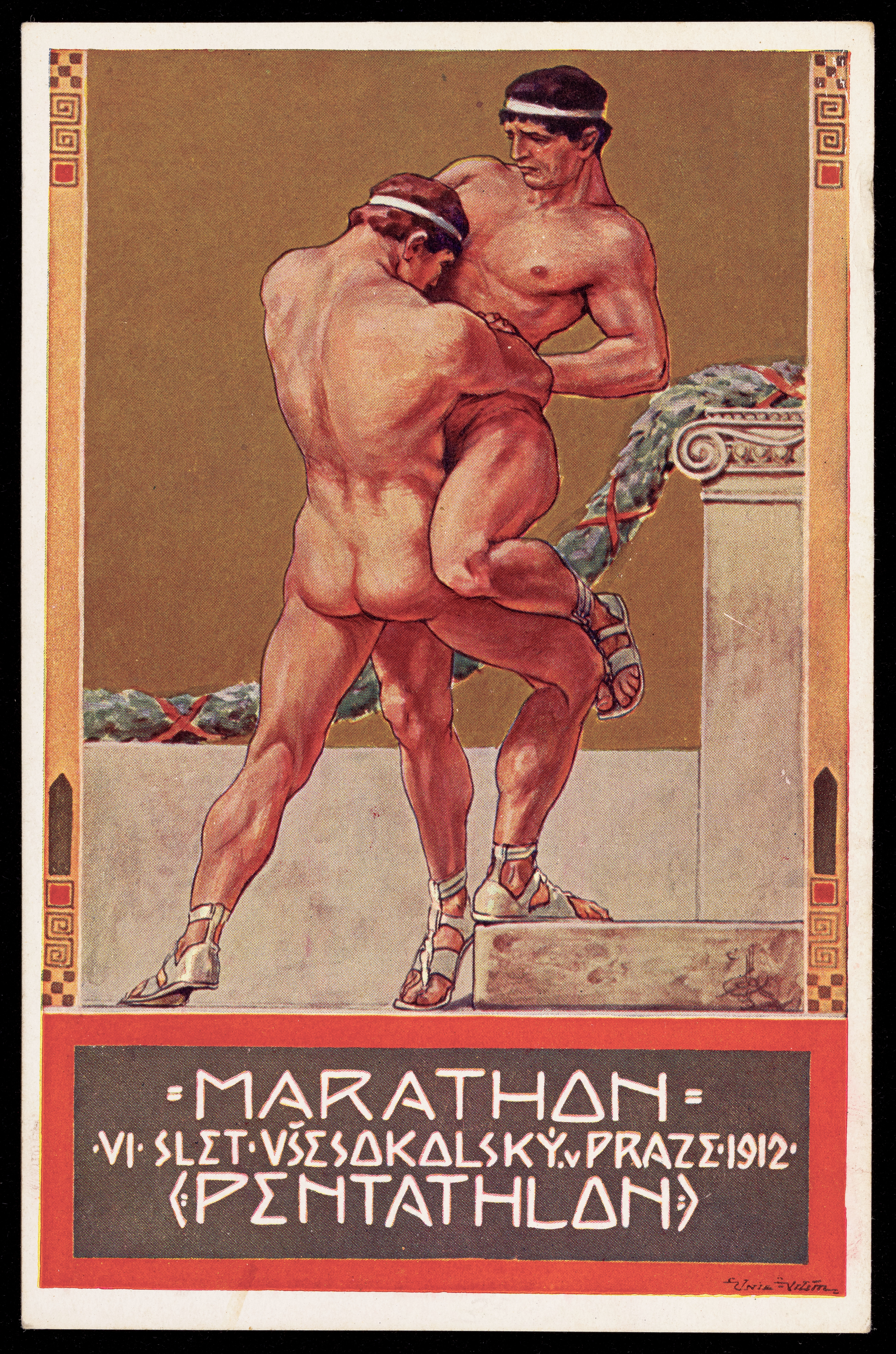
Postcard of wrestling tableau, 1912 Všeslovanský slet, by Kamil Vladislav Muttich

The rise of the Czech Social Democratic Party and agrarian parties in the political arena played out in Sokol politics as well as national ones. The Social Democrats formed a rival gymnastics society, the Workers' Gymnastic Union (Dělnická tělovýchovná jednota, DTJ). Václav Kukař, a powerful ČOS figure, developed the policy of "cleansing" (očištění) and sought to limit membership to those who he believed demonstrated commitment to purely Czech causes. Most of the progressive members of the Sokols were purged or left voluntarily to join the DTJ. Another rival gymnast society was founded by the Christian Social Party under the name Orel ("eagle"). In the face of such competition, the Sokols set about reaffirming their traditional mission under the leadership of Josef Scheiner.

The fourth slet, held in 1901, boasted a large international participation, including Galician Poles, Ukrainians, Slovenes, Croats, Russians, Bulgarians, Serbs, as well as Frenchmen and Americans. This slet also marked the first participation of women.

The fifth slet, held in 1907, had an increasingly Slavic focus and moved away from the more egalitarian idea of people's gymnastics, with increased competition aspects. In 1908, the Federation of Slavic Sokols was created, under the neo-Slavic idea of the Czechs as the strongest Slavic nation, second only to Russia.

At the 1910 meeting of the ČOS congress, the Sokols reaffirmed their intentions to remain "above politics" and loosened their strict membership rules to admit Social Democrats.

In 1912, the first "All-Slavic Slet" (Všeslovanský slet) was held, with a largely military atmosphere, causing Augustin Očenášek (a Sokol member) to remark, "When the thunder comes and the nations rise up to defend their existence, let it be the Sokol clubs from which the cry to battle will sound...".

=== World War I–World War II ===
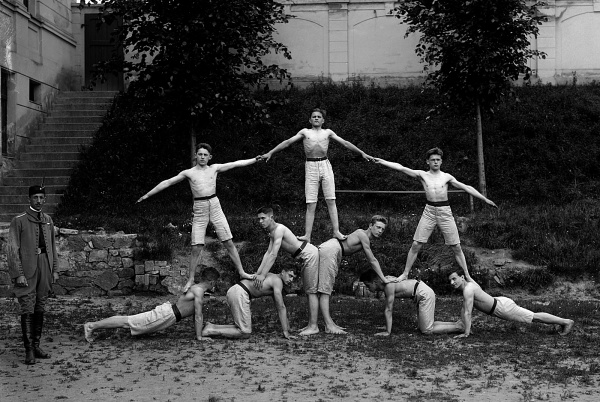
Exercises in Tábor, 1924. Photographed by Šechtl and Voseček

With the onset of World War I, in 1915, the Sokols were officially disbanded. Many members were active in persuading Czechs to defect from the Austro-Hungarian army to the Russian side. Sokol members also helped create the Czechoslovak Legions and local patrols that kept order after the disintegration of Habsburg authority, and during the creation of Czechoslovakia in October 1918. They also fulfilled their title as the "Czech national army", helping to defend Slovakia against the invasion of Béla Kun and the Hungarians.

Sokol flourished in the early interwar period, and by 1930, it had 630,000 members. The organization held one last slet on the eve of the Munich Agreement of 1938 and were later brutally suppressed and banned during the Nazi occupation of Bohemia and Moravia.

=== World War II–present ===
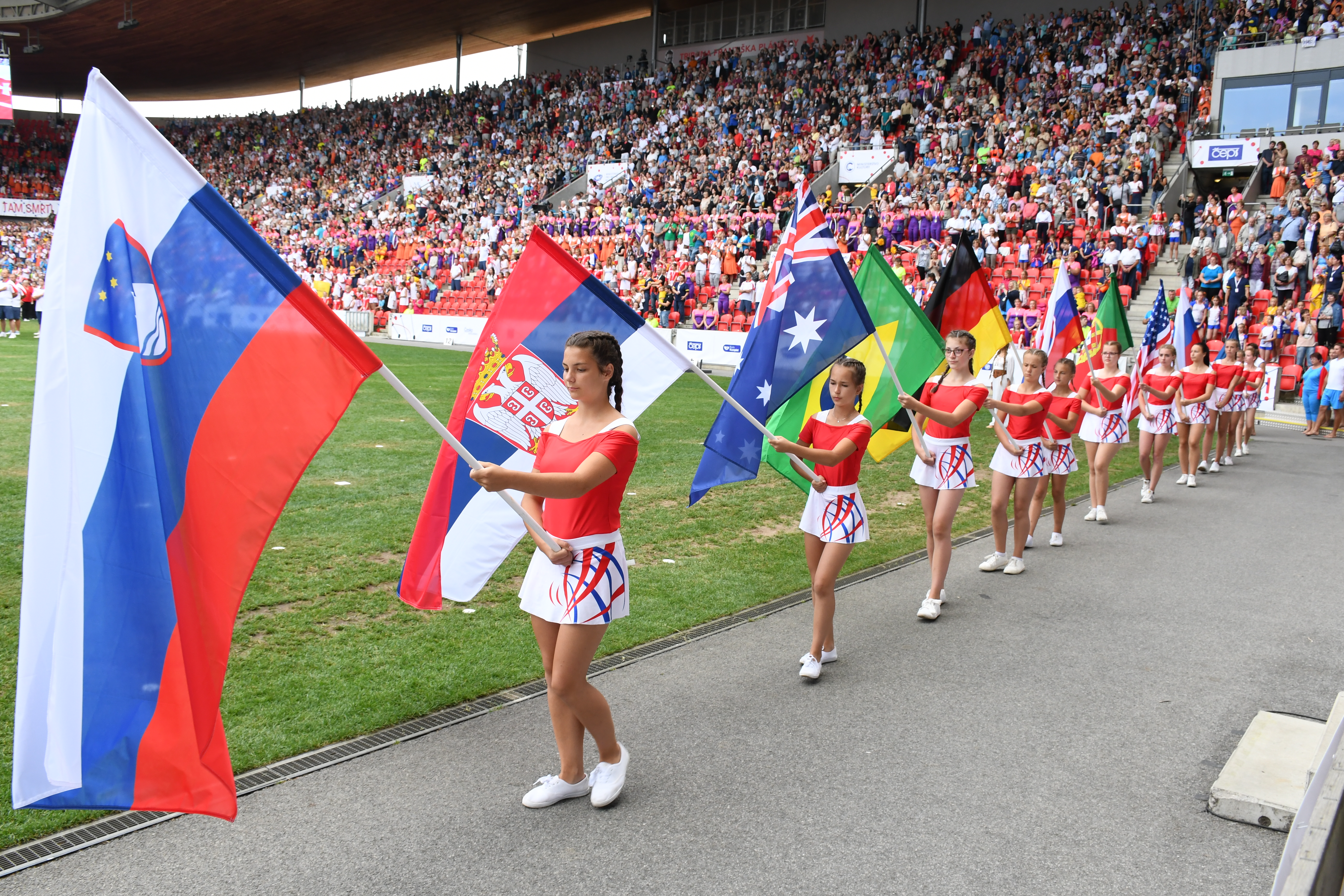
Sokol slet in Prague, 2018

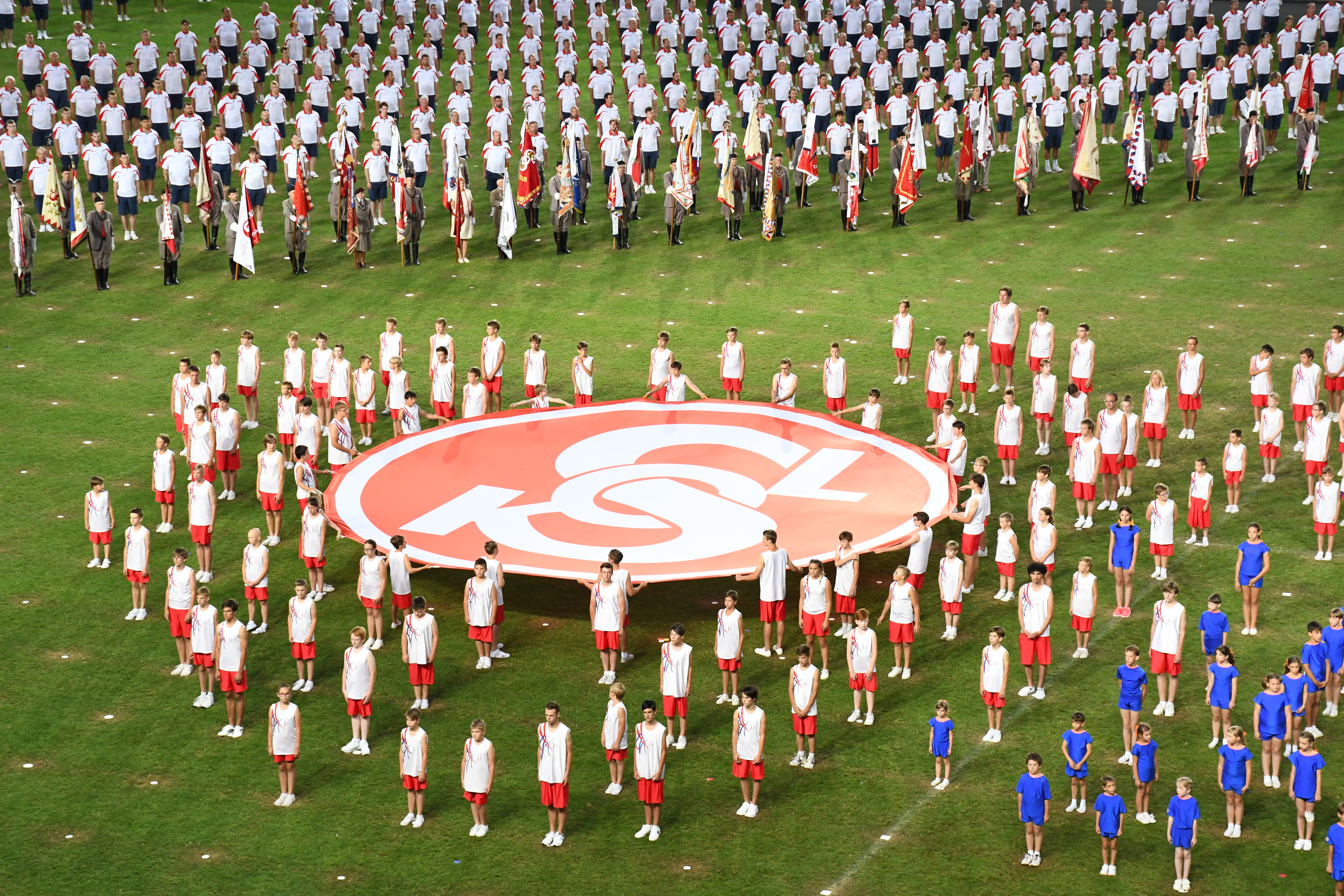
Sokol slet in Prague, 2018

After World War II, Sokols held one more slet, in 1948, before they were once again suppressed, this time by the Communists, who tried to replace slets with mass exercises, called Spartakiads (spartakiády), for propaganda purposes. Many Sokol members were imprisoned or exiled.

During the Prague Spring of 1968, former Sokol leaders tried to revive the organization, but their hopes were ended by the Warsaw Pact invasion and the normalization that followed. After years of hibernation, the movement was revived in 1990, following the fall of Communism. In 1994, it held its first slet in 46 years. Further slets were held in 2000 and 2006. In 2012, a celebration of 150 years of the Sokol movement took place, and in 2018, for the 100th anniversary of the creation of Czechoslovakia, 13,000 Sokol members gathered in Prague for the 16th slet.

== Sokol society among South Slavs ==
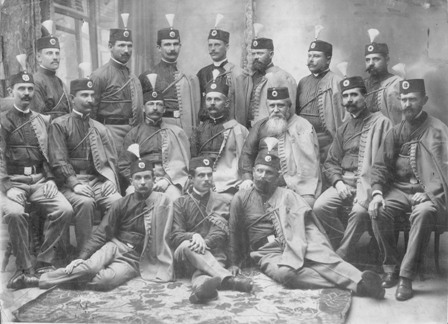
"Dušan the Mighty" Sokol society, Kragujevac, 1910

The Slovenes organized their own gymnastic society on 1 October 1863 and named it Južni Sokol ("south falcon"). In 1903, an all-Sokol rally was held in Ljubljana.

In Croatia, the Sokol movement had full support from Josip Juraj Strossmayer, then Bishop of Đakovo. After the dissolution of Austria-Hungary and the establishment of the Kingdom of Serbs, Croats and Slovenes in 1918, Croatian Sokols united with their Serbian and Slovenian counterparts in 1919.

The Croatian clergy forced Croatian Sokols to leave the Yugoslav Sokol alliance in 1919–20, fueling internal conflicts within the alliance on political grounds. At the same time, senior Catholic clergy established the Orlovi ("eagles") clerical organization, with the aim of leading youths away from the alliance. The Croatian Catholic Church rejected the pan-Slavic idea of bringing together Catholic, Orthodox, and Muslim believers under the motto that "a brother is dear regardless of his faith". The two Catholic organizations, Orlovi and Katolička Akcija (Catholic Action), were a major base of this resistance to the idea of Yugoslavism, brotherhood, and religious tolerance. The Catholic Church's resistance to this idea of pan-Slavism led the Polish Sokols to abstain from the international all-Sokol rally, held in Prague in 1926.

In the Kingdom of Yugoslavia, all Sokol societies were merged into the Union of Sokols of the Kingdom of Yugoslavia as of December 1929. The Orlovi were ordered to disband, but they instead rebranded themselves as religious fraternities.

The Belgrade-based FK BASK football club traces its origins to Serbian Sokol clubs.

== Sokol in America ==
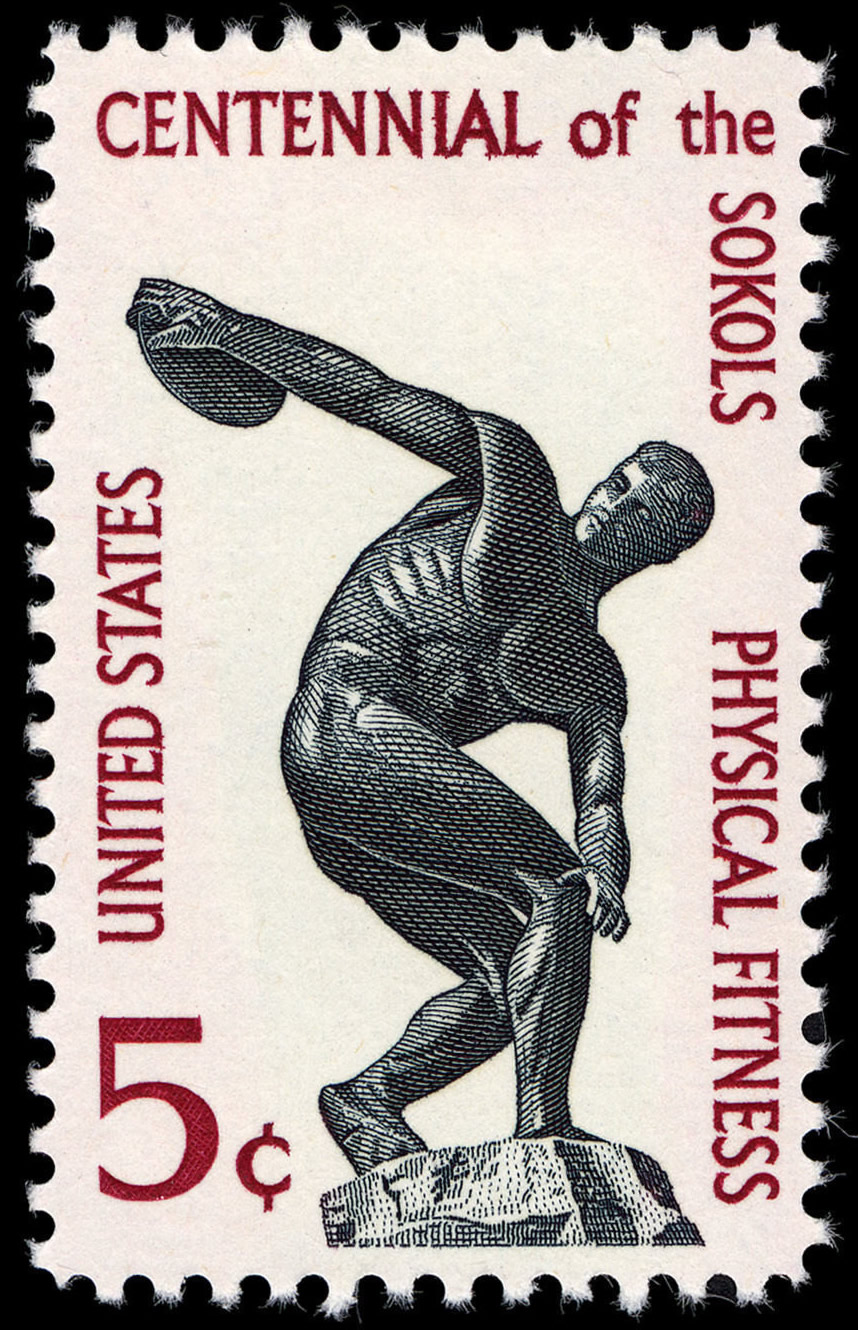
1965 U.S. commemorative stamp

Sokol members who emigrated from Czechoslovakia set up small groups abroad. This Sokol migration, for a variety of reasons, began even before the formation of Czechoslovakia, in 1918, and it intensified as a result of the World Wars and communist suppression. Bohemian, Moravian, and Slovak immigrants and Czech-American citizens started the American Sokol Organization in St. Louis, Missouri, in 1865, only three years after the first Prague Sokol. By 1878, the United States had 13 Sokol chapters.

By 1937, American Sokol membership rolls counted nearly 20,000 adults in areas as far-flung as Baltimore, New York City, Pittsburgh, Chicago, Detroit, Cleveland, and Oakland, as well as in parts of Canada.

In the United States, Czech (American Sokol Organization) and Slovak (Sokol USA and Slovak Catholic Sokol) organizations alternate in hosting slets at four-year intervals. Regional districts of the American Sokol Organization and Sokol USA also host smaller regional slets on an annual basis.

== World Sokol Federation ==
All Sokol organizations around the world are united within the World Sokol Federation, which was established on 31 January 1994 in Prague, following the revival of the Sokol movement after the fall of Communism.

== Symbols ==
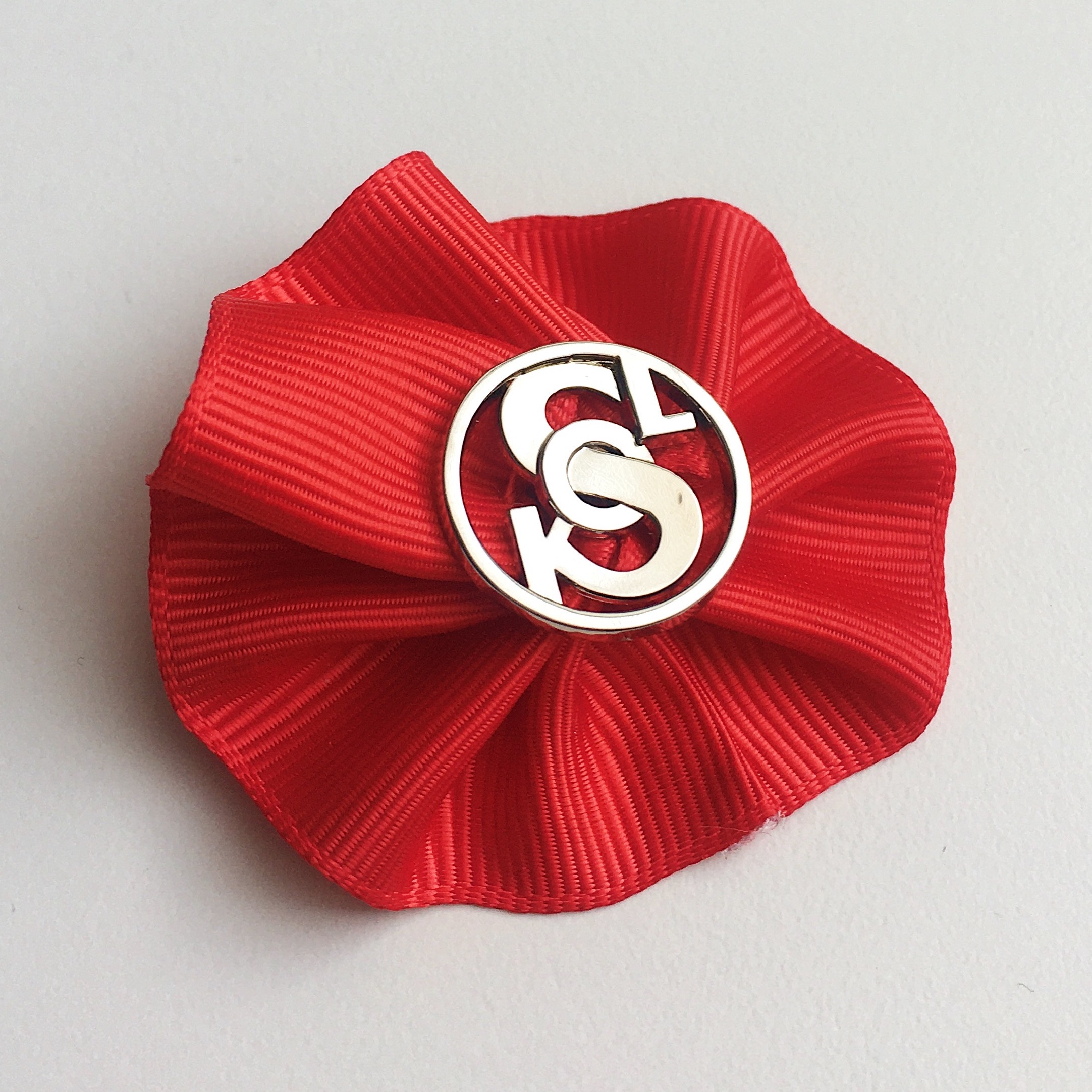
Sokol memorial cockade

Sokol flag (1938–2019)

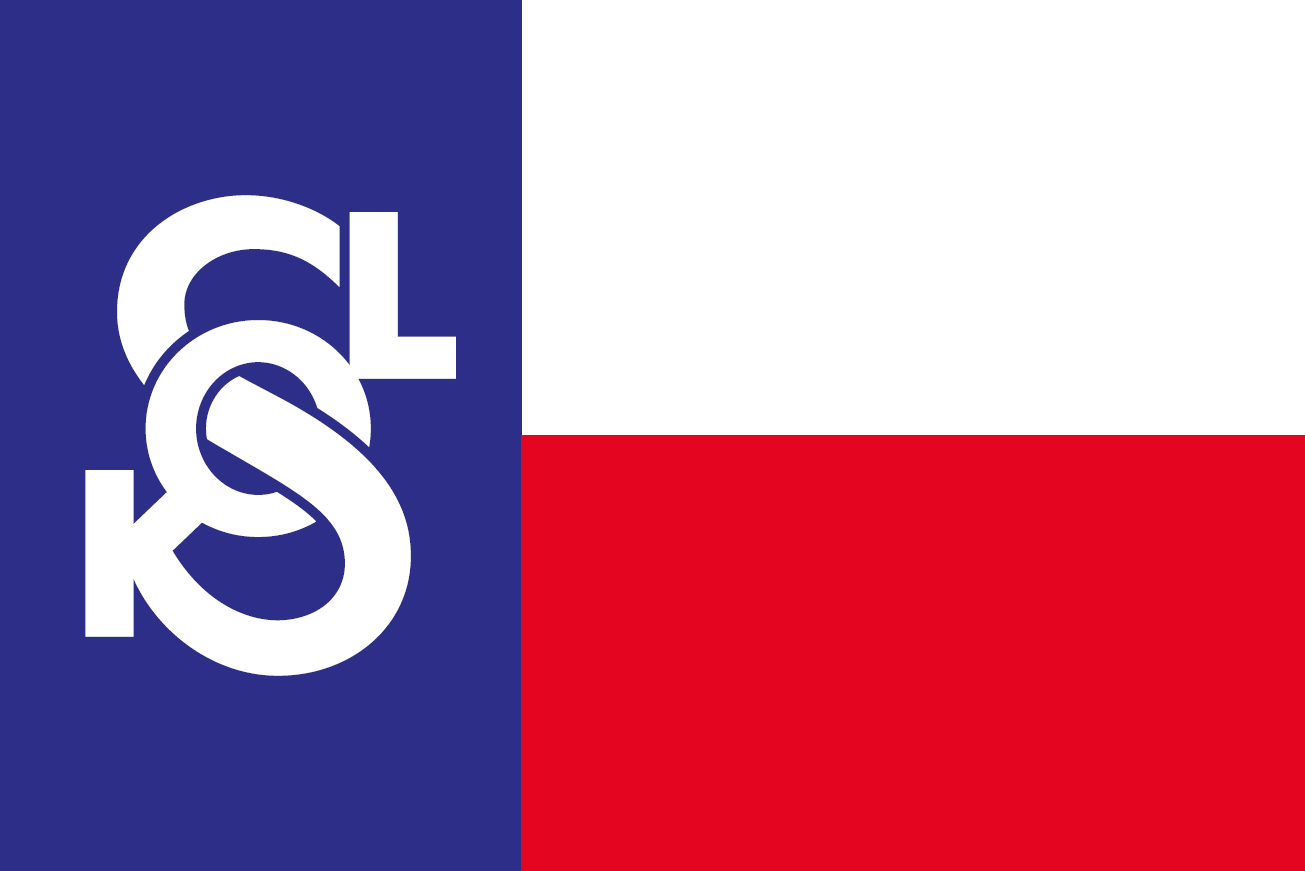
Sokol flag since 2019

== See also ==
- Ivan Bobersky
- Sokol Auditorium
- Sokol Pavilion
- Pionýr
- Marie Provazníková

== Sources ==
- Crampton, R. J. Eastern Europe in the Twentieth Century—and After. London: Routledge, 1997.
- Jandásek, Ladislav. "The Founder of the Sokols: Miroslav Tyrš". Slavonic and East European Review, 10 (1931/1932).
- Krüger, Arnd and Murray, William (eds.). The Nazi Olympics: Sport, Politics, and Appeasement in the 1930s. University of Illinois: 2003. p. 9.
- Nolte, Claire E. "Our Brothers across the Ocean: The Czech Sokol in America to 1914", International Journal of the History of Sport 26 (no. 13, 2009) 1963–82.
- Nolte, Claire E. The Sokol in the Czech Lands to 1914: Training for the Nation. New York: Palgrave Macmillan, 2002.
- Roubal, Petr,. Spartakiads: the politics of physical culture in Communist Czechoslovakia (First English edition ed.). Czech Republic. ISBN 978-80-246-4366-3. OCLC 1140640610.
