= Grafton =

Grafton may refer to:

== Places ==
=== Australia ===
- Grafton, New South Wales

=== Canada ===
- Grafton, New Brunswick
- Grafton, Nova Scotia
- Grafton, Ontario

=== England ===
- Grafton, Cheshire
- Grafton, Herefordshire
- Grafton, North Yorkshire
- Grafton, Oxfordshire
- Grafton, Shropshire
- Grafton, Wiltshire
- Grafton, Worcestershire
- Grafton Manor, Worcestershire
- Grafton Flyford, Worcestershire
- Grafton Regis, Northamptonshire
- Grafton Underwood, Northamptonshire
- Ardens Grafton, Warwickshire
- Temple Grafton, Warwickshire
- The Honour of Grafton, a collection of manors in Northamptonshire

=== Ireland ===
- Grafton Street, Dublin

=== New Zealand ===
- Grafton, New Zealand, an inner city suburb of the city of Auckland

=== Sierra Leone ===
- Grafton, Sierra Leone

=== United States ===
==== Localities ====
- Knights Landing, California, formerly Grafton
- Grafton, Illinois
- Grafton, Indiana
- Grafton, Iowa
- Grafton, Kansas
- Grafton, Massachusetts
  - Grafton (MBTA station)
- Grafton, Nebraska
- Grafton, New Hampshire
- Grafton, New York
- Grafton, North Dakota
- Grafton, Ohio
- Grafton, Utah, a ghost town
- Grafton, Vermont, a New England town
  - Grafton (CDP), Vermont, the central village in the town
- Grafton, Virginia
- Grafton, West Virginia
- Grafton, Wisconsin, a village
- Grafton (town), Wisconsin, adjacent to the village

==== Counties ====
- Grafton County, New Hampshire

==== Townships ====
- Grafton Township, McHenry County, Illinois
- Grafton Township, Sibley County, Minnesota
- Grafton Township, Fillmore County, Nebraska
- Grafton Township, Walsh County, North Dakota
- Grafton Township, Lorain County, Ohio

== Companies ==
- Grafton (publisher), a British paperback book imprint, active 1981–1993
- Grafton Architects, comprising architects Shelley McNamara and Yvonne Farrell
- Grafton Cinema, 1911–1973
- Grafton Entertainment, a record label
- Grafton Group, an Ireland-based builders merchants business.

== Ships ==
- HMS Grafton (1679), a 70-gun third-rate ship of the line launched in 1679, rebuilt in 1700, and captured by the French in 1707
- HMS Grafton (1709), a 70-gun third-rate launched in 1709, rebuilt in 1725 and broken up in 1744
- HMS Grafton (1750), a 70-gun third-rate launched in 1750 and sold in 1767
- HMS Grafton (1771), a 74-gun third-rate launched in 1771
- HMS Grafton (1892), an Edgar-class cruiser launched in 1892 and broken up in 1920
- HMS Grafton (H89), a G-class destroyer launched in 1935 and torpedoed in 1940
- HMS Grafton (F51), a Blackwood-class (Type 14) frigate launched in 1957 and broken up in 1971
- HMS Grafton (F80), a Type 23 frigate
- USS Grafton (APA-109), a Bayfield-class attack transport launched in 1944 and scrapped in 1974
- Grafton (ship), a schooner wrecked on the Auckland Islands in 1864
- SS John Grafton, used by Finnish exiles to smuggle arms into Russian-ruled Finland in 1905

== Other uses ==
- Grafton (name)
- Duke of Grafton
- Grafton Galleries, an art gallery that existed in Mayfair, London.
- Grafton saxophone, a unique 1950s alto saxophone constructed mainly from plastic

== See also ==
- Grafton High School (disambiguation)
- New Grafton, Nova Scotia
