= Grafton Township =

Grafton Township may refer to one of the following places in the United States:

- Grafton Township, McHenry County, Illinois
- Grafton Township, Sibley County, Minnesota
- Grafton Township, Fillmore County, Nebraska
- Grafton Township, Walsh County, North Dakota
- Grafton Township, Lorain County, Ohio
- Grafton Township, Miner County, South Dakota

== See also ==
- Grafton (disambiguation)
