= F. M. Clark =

American football coach

Coaching career (HC unless noted)
- 1909: Doane

Head coaching record
- Overall: 3–2–3

F. M. Clark was an American football coach. He served as the 12th head football coach at Doane College in Crete, Nebraska and he held that position for the 1909 season. His coaching record at Doane was 3–2–3.
