= Boswell Observatory =

Observatory in Nebraska, U.S.

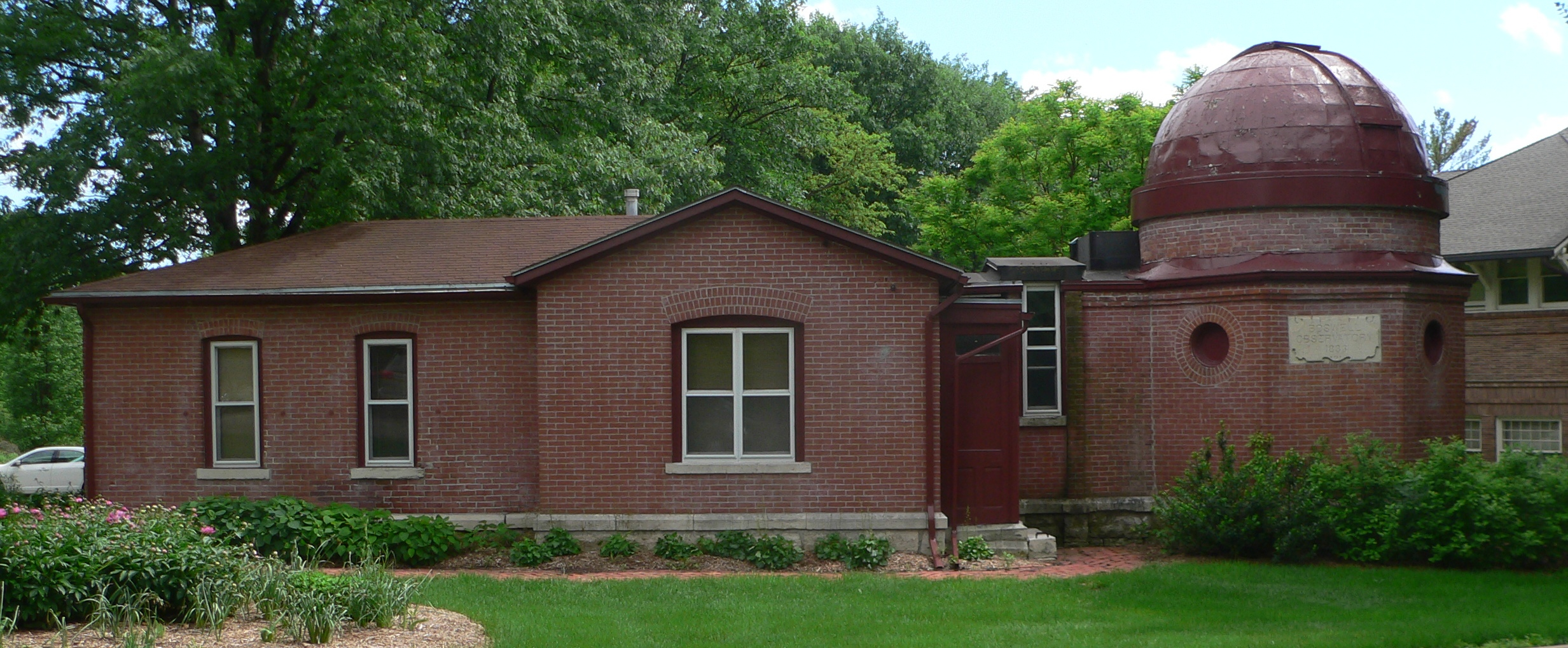
- Location: Doane College, Crete, Nebraska, US
- Coordinates: 40°43′11.67″N 96°57′3.96″W
- Established: 1883

Telescopes
- unnamed: 8-inch Alvan Clark
- Related media on Commons

Boswell Observatory is located at Doane College in Crete, Nebraska. Built in 1883, it was primarily a time service observatory and student teaching observatory and is the oldest building on Doan's campus that remains functional today. The first telescope in the building was an eight-inch (200 mm) Alvan Clark.

The observatory is still used by the astronomy classes and is open to the public at different times throughout the year. It is no longer in operation as a weather station, but has been preserved well. The building is listed on the National Register of Historic Places as part of the Doane College Historic Buildings.

== See also ==
- Doane College Historic Buildings
- List of astronomical observatories
