= Berks, Nebraska =

Unincorporated community in Lancaster and Saline counties in Nebraska, United States

- Unincorporated community
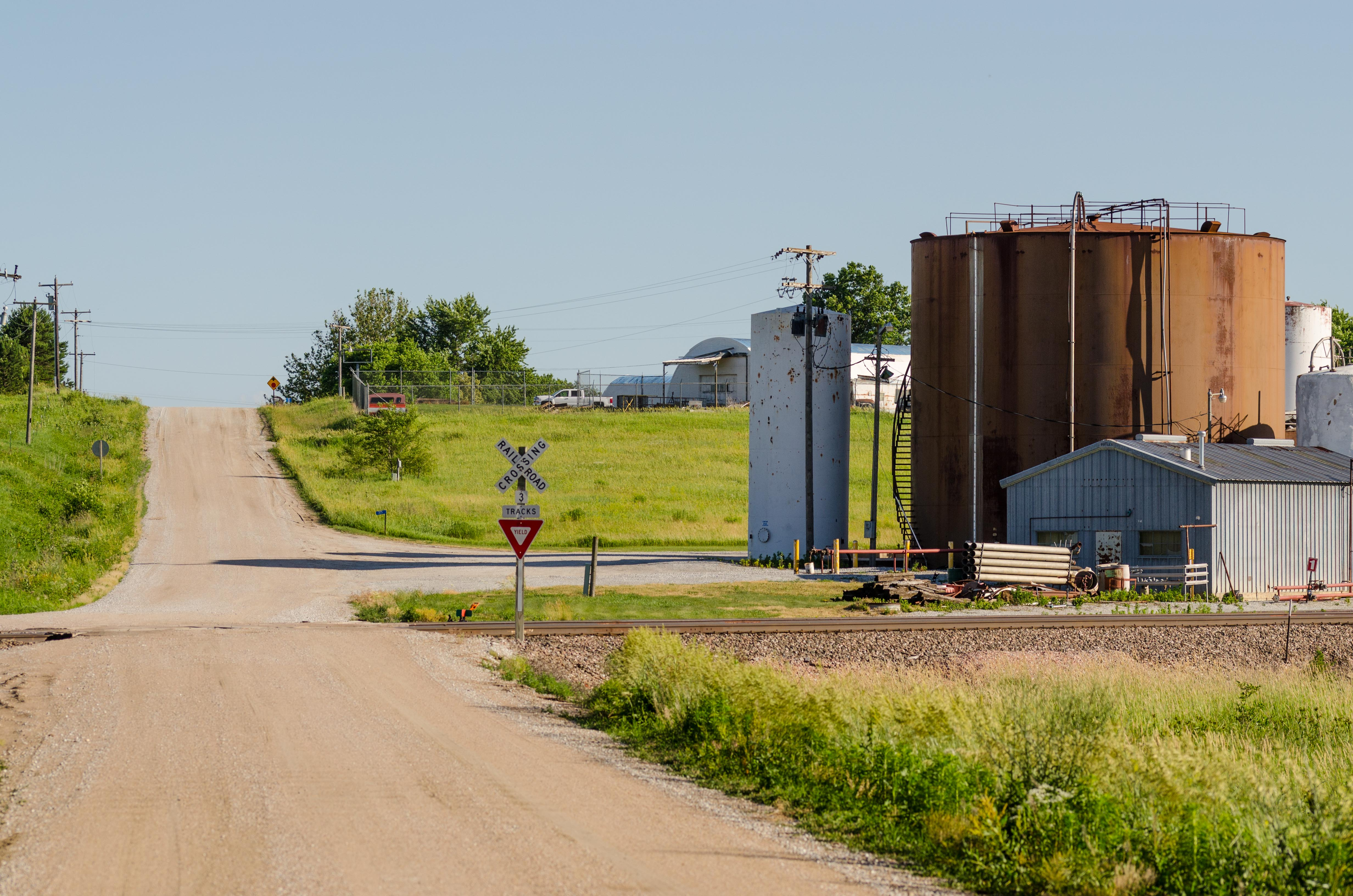
- South along SW 142en Street (along the Lancaster–Saline county line) in Berks, June 2017

- Location in Nebraska Location in the United States
- Coordinates: 40°39′31″N 96°54′49″W
- Country: United States
- State: Nebraska
- Counties: Lancaster & Saline
- Elevation: 1,417 ft (432 m)
- Time zone: UTC-6 (Central (CST))
  - Summer (DST): UTC-5 (CDT)
- ZIP codes: 68333
- GNIS feature ID: 835247

Berks is an unincorporated community in Lancaster and Saline counties in Nebraska, United States. The community is located approximately three miles (4.8 km) northeast of Crete on the BNSF Railroad Line and north of Nebraska Highway 33.

== History ==
Some people hold Berks was the name of an early settler, while others believe the community was named after Berks County, Pennsylvania. The name was also probably chosen to conform with the alphabetical stops on the new Burlington & Quincy Railroad line traveling westward from Lincoln: Berks, Crete, Dorchester, Exeter, Fairmont, Grafton, Huxley, etc. The Berks post office was discontinued in 1912.
