= Ray Adams =

Ray Adams may refer to:

- Ray Adams (singer) (1931–2003), Norwegian singer
- Ray Adams (basketball) (1912–1992), American basketball player

== See also ==
- Raymond Delacy Adams (1911–2008), American neurologist and neuropathologist
- Raymonn Adams (born 1978), American football running back and return specialist
