= News-Times =

News-Times may refer to the following newspapers:

- The News-Times, a newspaper in Danbury, Connecticut
- The Columbia County News–Times, a newspaper in Columbia County, Georgia
- News Times, a newspaper in Hartford City, Indiana
- News-Times (Forest Grove), a newspaper in Forest Grove, Oregon
- News-Times (Newport), a former newspaper in Newport, Oregon
- News Time, Indian television news channel in West Bengal
- News Time Assam or Pratidin Time, Indian television news channel in Assam
- York News-Times, a newspaper in York, Nebraska
