= Exhall, Stratford-on-Avon =

Village in Warwickshire, England

Coordinates: 52.19°N 01.85°W

Exhall
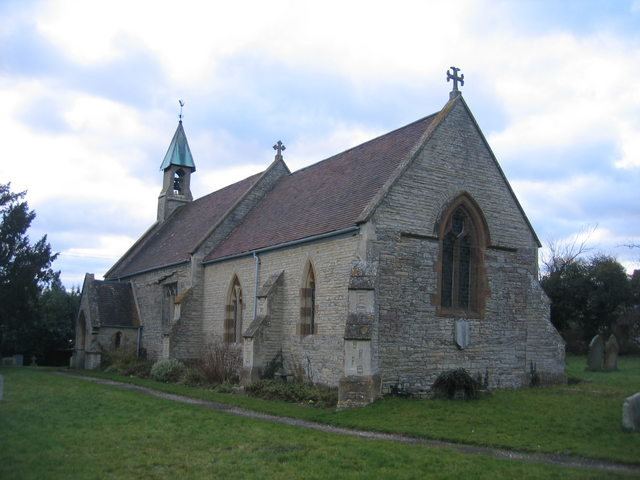
- St Giles' parish church

- Location within Warwickshire
- Population: 203 (2011 Census)
- OS grid reference: SP1055
- District: Stratford-on-Avon
- Shire county: Warwickshire
- Region: West Midlands
- Country: England
- Sovereign state: United Kingdom
- Post town: Alcester
- Postcode district: B49
- Dialling code: 01789
- Police: Warwickshire
- Fire: Warwickshire
- Ambulance: West Midlands
- UK Parliament: Stratford-on-Avon

Exhall is a village and civil parish about 1 1/4 miles (2 km) south-south-east of Alcester in the Stratford-on-Avon district of Warwickshire, England. Its parish includes the hamlet of Little Britain and part of Ardens Grafton, the greater part of which is in the neighbouring civil parish of Temple Grafton. The 2011 Census recorded Exhall parish's population as 203. Exhall is on Hay Brook, a tributary of the River Arrow. The civil parish neighbours those of Alcester and Wixford, with which it shares both an ecclesiastical parish and a cricket club.

== History ==
Exhall is known as one of the "Shakespeare villages". William Shakespeare is said to have joined a party of Stratford folk which set itself to outdrink a drinking club at Bidford-on-Avon, and as a result of his labours in that regard to have fallen asleep under the crab tree of which a descendant is still called Shakespeare's tree. When morning dawned his friends wished to renew the encounter but he wisely said "No I have drunk with Piping Pebworth, Dancing Marston, Haunted Hillboro’, Hungry Grafton, Dodging Exhall, Papist Wixford, Beggarly Broom and Drunken Bidford' and so, presumably, I will drink no more." The story is said to date from the 17th century but of its truth or of any connection of the story or the verse to Shakespeare there is no evidence. The nickname "Dodging Exhall" may have arisen from the fact that the village was not, at any rate in the 18th century, directly approachable either from Alcester or Stratford.

Exhall is first mentioned in the grant by Ceolred of Mercia to Evesham Abbey in 710. It also appears in the list of manors acquired by Abbot Ethelwig and the estates for which William I directed Bishop Wulfstan to give the abbot protection, but it was among the manors seized by Bishop Odo of Bayeux after Ethelwig's death in 1077, being then assessed at 2 hides. By 1086, it is recorded in the Domesday Book as part of the lands of William son of Courbucion; who was appointed Sheriff of Warwick soon after 1086; where it reads, "In Ferncombe Hundred, Thorkell holds 1 1/2 hides in Ecleshelle (Exhall). Land for 1 plough. 2 smallholders. Meadow, 10 acres. The value was 10s now 5s. Swein held it freely before 1066."

== Governance ==
Exhall is part of the Salford Priors and Alcester Rural ward of Stratford-on-Avon District Council, represented by Councillor Ashley Jones, Reform UK. Nationally it is part of Stratford-on-Avon parliamentary constituency. Prior to Brexit in 2020 it was part of the West Midlands electoral region of the European Parliament.

== Parish church ==
The parish church for Exhall and Wixford, located in Exhall and dedicated to St. Giles, is a small building with a nave dating from the 12th century, a 13th-century chancel, a south porch and a bell turret. The Norman origin of the nave is proved by the built-up doorway on the North side, with scalloped capitals and a one-step arch. The church was much restored and in part rebuilt in 1862, mainly at the cost of the then rector. However, the Worcester Diocesan Architectural Society protested in 1861 against the plans of the builder, Soloman Hunt, to remove the Norman doorway, the old windows and the original bell turret and so the Church Building Society refused to make a grant.

The font has a tapering round bowl on an octagonal stem; it is possibly an ancient bowl reworked but shows no signs of former staples for the lid. In the chancel floor are small brass standing effigies of John Walsingham, died 20 January 1566, and Eleanor Ashfield his wife. He is shown in Elizabethan armour and is incised on an irregularly rectangular plate, only silhouetted on his left side below the shoulder, possibly a palimpsest. She is in silhouette and wears a close cap, brocaded dress with padded sleeves, and a long cloak. Above the figures are two shields set upside down. The dexter charged with a trefoil between three molets (Ashfield); the sinister charged quarterly the first, destroyed, the second and third, a checky cross between sixteen roundels, and the fourth, a paly of six a fesse (Walsingham).

== Long-distance footpath ==
The Arden Way long-distance footpath passes through Exhall.
