= John Huband =

16th-century English politicians

John Huband (c. 1544 – 24 December 1583), of Leominster, Herefordshire; Hillbarrow, Ippsley and Temple Grafton, Warwickshire was a Member of Parliament for Warwickshire in 1571 and 1572.
