= Doane College Historic Buildings =

- Doane University Historic Buildings
- U.S. National Register of Historic Places
- U.S. Historic district
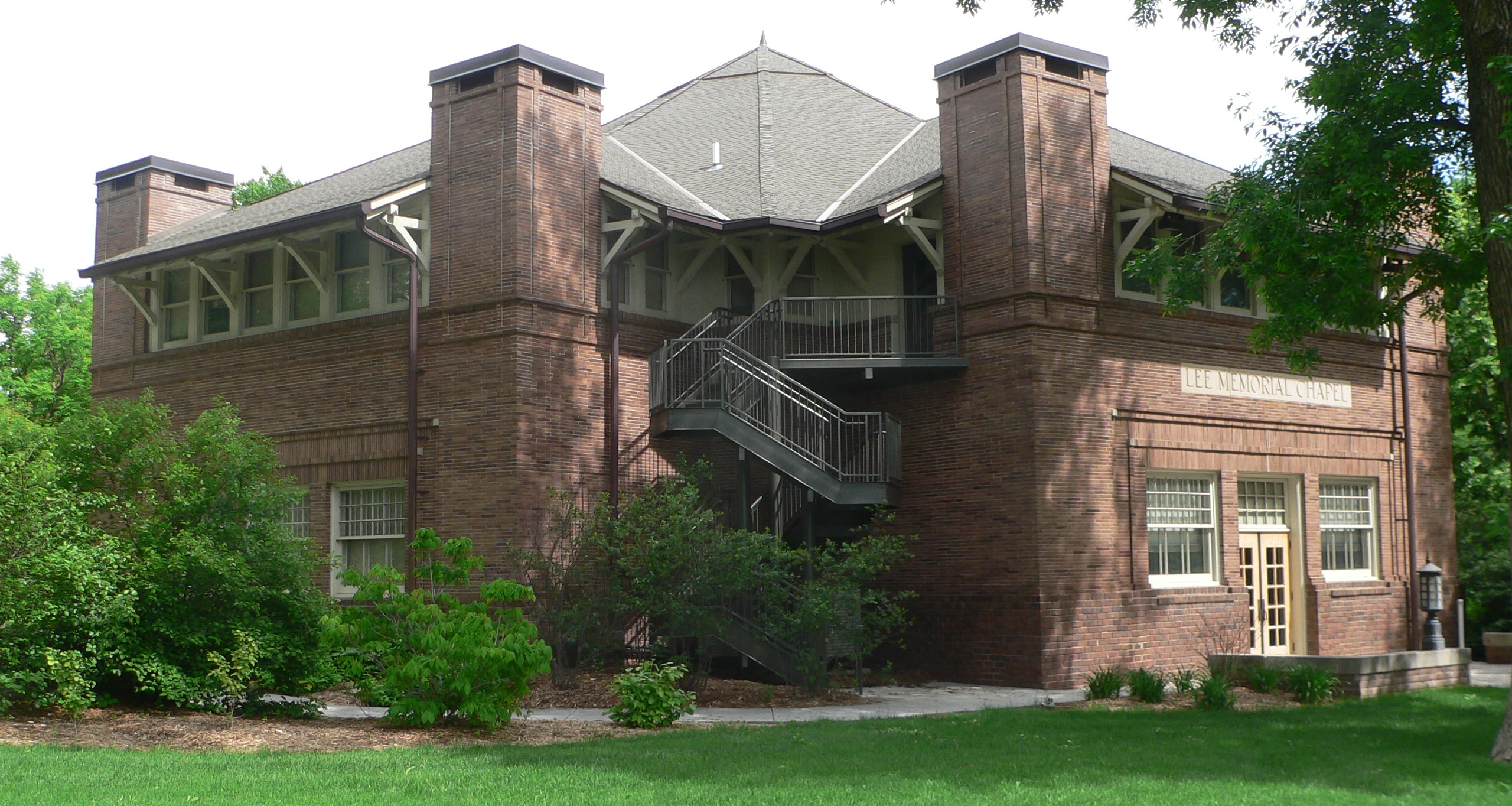
- Whitcomb Lee Conservatory

- Location within Nebraska Location within the United States
- Location: Doane University campus, Crete, Nebraska
- Coordinates: 40°37′19″N 96°57′3″W
- Area: 8 acres (3.2 ha)
- Built: 1883
- Architect: Dean & Dean; Young, Fred
- Architectural style: Prairie School
- NRHP reference No.: 77000836
- Added to NRHP: August 16, 1977

The Doane University Historic Buildings are located on the Doane University campus at 1014 Boswell Avenue in Crete, Nebraska, United States. Listed on the National Register of Historic Places as a historic district, there are three buildings included: Gaylord Hall, Whitcomb Conservatory/Lee Memorial Chapel, and Boswell Observatory.

== About ==
Gaylord Hall was built in 1884 as a women's dormitory. Boswell Observatory is a small structure built in 1883–84 to house Doane College's program in astronomy and meteorology. The Whitcomb Lee Conservatory was completed in 1907.

The Whitcomb Lee Conservatory, also known as The Con, is a two-story building designed by the Chicago architectural firm of Dean and Dean in 1905. It was completed in 1907, and originally housed Lee Memorial Chapel and the music department. It is a five-sided brick building that. In 2005 the building was renovated, and currently provides facilities for the university's theatre department and speech team. The conservatory was winner of the 2005 AIA Nebraska Design Award for its restoration.

Gaylord Hall was the third building constructed on the Doane College campus and was completed in 1884. Built in a late Victorian residential style, the hall was originally a residence hall for female students called Ladies Hall. It was renamed after Reverend Reuben Gaylord, a pioneer home missionary and Christian educator in Iowa and Nebraska. It is rumored by students to be haunted.
