= KDNE =

- Crete, Nebraska; United States
- Frequency: 91.9 MHz
- Branding: The Edge of Indie, the Indie Kidney (former)

Programming
- Format: College Radio, Indie, Adult Alternative, Folk, Alternative Country

Ownership
- Owner: Doane University Board of Trustees

History
- Call sign meaning: Doane Nebraska

Technical information
- Licensing authority: FCC
- Facility ID: 17043
- Class: A
- ERP: 200 watts
- HAAT: 20.0 meters
- Transmitter coordinates: 40°37′16″N 96°57′4″W

Links
- Public license information: Public file; LMS
- Website: doaneline.com

KDNE (91.9 FM) is a radio station broadcasting an Indie format. Licensed in Crete, Nebraska, United States. The station is currently owned by the Doane University Board of Trustees.

== See also ==
- Campus radio
- List of college radio stations in the United States
