= Dorchester, Nebraska =

- Village
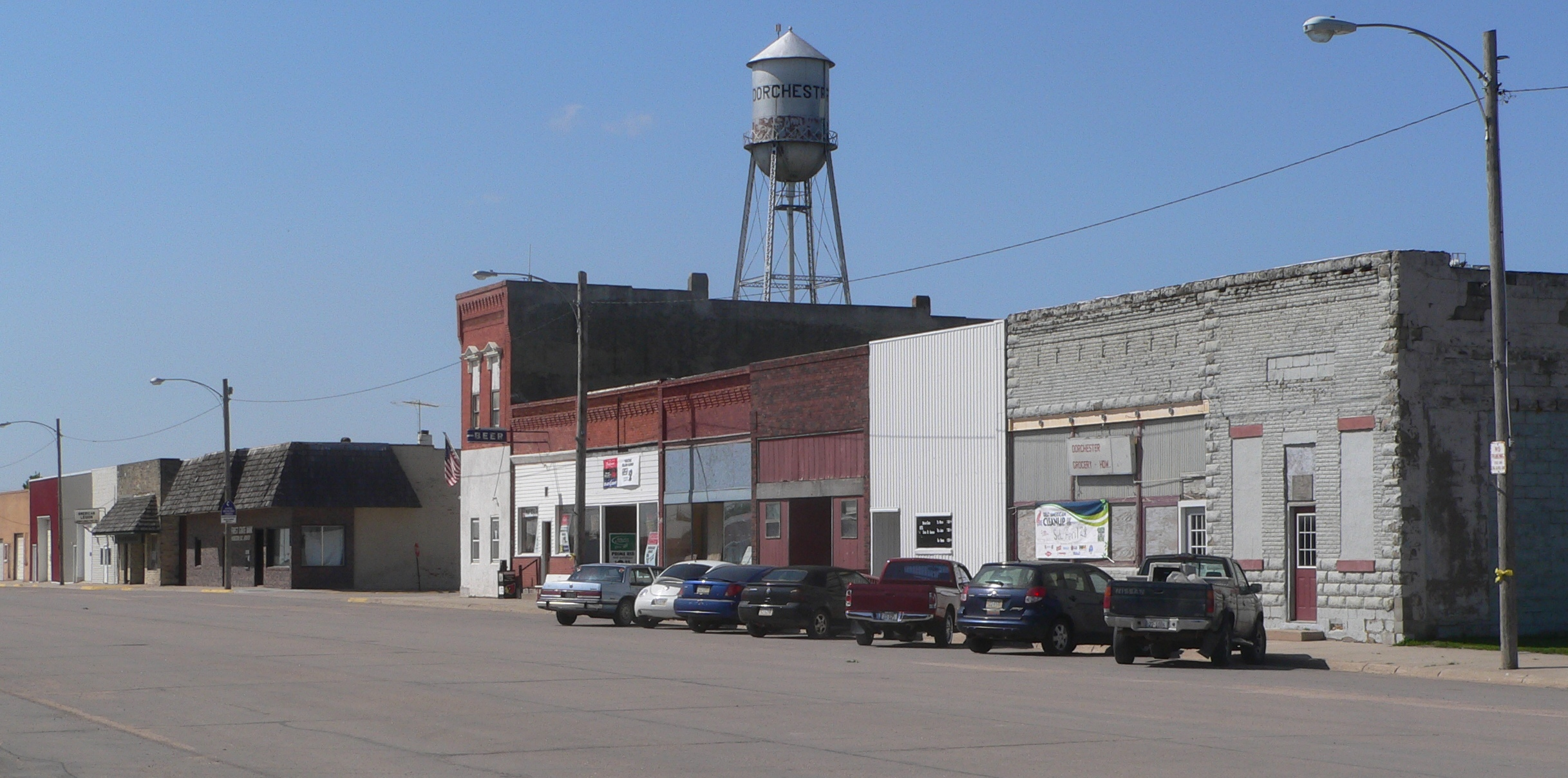
- Downtown Dorchester.

- Location of Dorchester, Nebraska
- Coordinates: 40°38′52″N 97°06′55″W
- Country: United States
- State: Nebraska
- County: Saline

Area
  - Total: 0.50 sq mi (1.30 km^{2})
  - Land: 0.50 sq mi (1.30 km^{2})
  - Water: 0 sq mi (0.00 km^{2})
- Elevation: 1,486 ft (453 m)

Population (2020)
  - Total: 596
  - Estimate (2021): 588
  - Density: 1,190/sq mi (458/km^{2})
- Time zone: UTC-6 (Central (CST))
  - Summer (DST): UTC-5 (CDT)
- ZIP code: 68343
- Area code: 402
- FIPS code: 31-13435
- GNIS feature ID: 2398741
- Website: dorchester.municipalimpact.com

Dorchester is a village in Saline County, Nebraska, United States. It is thirty-eight miles southwest from the Lincoln, Nebraska metropolitan area. The population was 596 at the 2020 census.

== History ==
Dorchester was platted in 1870 when the Burlington and Missouri River Railroad was extended to that point. The name was probably chosen to conform with the alphabetical stops on the new Burlington & Quincy Railroad line traveling westward from Lincoln: Berks, Crete, Dorchester, Exeter, Fairmont, Grafton, Huxley, etc. It was likely named after Dorchester, Massachusetts, although some say it was named for Dorchester, in England, which in any case is the namesake of the Massachusetts city.

== Geography ==
According to the United States Census Bureau, the village has a total area of 0.48 square miles (1.24 km^{2}), all land.

== Demographics ==
Historical population
Census	Pop.	Note	%±
1880	309		—
1890	540		74.8%
1900	521		−3.5%
1910	610		17.1%
1920	522		−14.4%
1930	579		10.9%
1940	558		−3.6%
1950	478		−14.3%
1960	460		−3.8%
1970	492		7.0%
1980	611		24.2%
1990	614		0.5%
2000	615		0.2%
2010	586		−4.7%
2020	610		4.1%
2021 (est.)	588	▼	−3.6%
U.S. Decennial Census

=== 2010 census ===
As of the census of 2010, there were 586 people, 233 households, and 166 families residing in the village. The population density was 1,220.8 inhabitants per square mile (471.4/km^{2}). There were 253 housing units at an average density of 527.1 per square mile (203.5/km^{2}). The racial makeup of the village was 90.8% White, 1.0% African American, 0.2% Native American, 0.2% Asian, 6.8% from other races, and 1.0% from two or more races. Hispanic or Latino of any race were 9.7% of the population.

There were 233 households, of which 34.3% had children under the age of 18 living with them, 55.8% were married couples living together, 11.6% had a female householder with no husband present, 3.9% had a male householder with no wife present, and 28.8% were non-families. 24.0% of all households were made up of individuals, and 7.7% had someone living alone who was 65 years of age or older. The average household size was 2.52 and the average family size was 2.98.

The median age in the village was 37.5 years. 26.1% of residents were under the age of 18; 7.1% were between the ages of 18 and 24; 26.4% were from 25 to 44; 26.8% were from 45 to 64; and 13.3% were 65 years of age or older. The gender makeup of the village was 48.5% male and 51.5% female.

=== 2000 census ===
As of the census of 2000, there were 615 people, 148 households, and 85 families residing in the village. The population density was 1,349.3 inhabitants per square mile (521.0/km^{2}). There were 258 housing units at an average density of 566.1 per square mile (218.6/km^{2}). The racial makeup of the village was 97.24% White, 2.60% from other races, and 0.16% from two or more races. Hispanic or Latino of any race were 4.07% of the population.

There were 248 households, out of which 32.7% had children under the age of 18 living with them, 60.1% were married couples living together, 10.1% had a female householder with no husband present, and 25.4% were non-families. 23.4% of all households were made up of individuals, and 12.9% had someone living alone who was 65 years of age or older. The average household size was 2.48 and the average family size was 2.88.

In the village, the population was spread out, with 24.9% under the age of 18, 7.8% from 18 to 24, 28.6% from 25 to 44, 20.5% from 45 to 64, and 18.2% who were 65 years of age or older. The median age was 38 years. For every 100 females, there were 93.4 males. For every 100 females age 18 and over, there were 90.9 males.

As of 2000 the median income for a household in the village was $34,000, and the median income for a family was $40,982. Males had a median income of $29,803 versus $23,750 for females. The per capita income for the village was $16,389. About 4.1% of families and 6.2% of the population were below the poverty line, including 2.8% of those under age 18 and 8.8% of those age 65 or over.

== Notable people ==
- Jefferson Coates - Medal of Honor recipient
- Fred Gustus Johnson - U.S. Representative and Lieutenant Governor of Nebraska
