= Toshihiro Takami =

Japanese pastor and nonprofit founder

Toshihiro Takami (高見敏弘; 1925–2019) was the founder of the Asian Rural Institute (ARI) in Japan. Takami was a Christian pastor assigned to a disaster relief project in Bangladesh after the floods of 1970. Discerning a dearth of capable and committed local leaders, he determined to establish an institute dedicated to providing them with training and skills to increase their capacity to serve their people. In 1973, he founded the Asian Rural Institute or ARI.

== Early life ==
In his youth, Takami was sent by his parents to a Zen monastery in Kyoto. At the age of eighteen, just months before the end of World War II, he enlisted in the Japanese Navy and briefly attended radar school. In 1951, Takami found work as a cook for a Christian missionary where he began to study Christianity. Soon after, he was baptized. A youth organization in the United States then sponsored him to attend Doane College in Nebraska. By 1960, he had earned his bachelor's degree, graduated from Yale Divinity School, and become an ordained minister in the United Church of Christ, Japan.

== Tsurukawa Rural Evangelical Seminary and the Asian Rural Institute ==
Takami taught practical theology and directed the Southeast Asia Christian Rural Leaders course at the Tsurukawa Rural Evangelical Seminary in Tokyo for ten years, where he eventually designed the institute's curriculum around small-scale organic farming and animal husbandry.

Although based in Christianity, ARI is not exclusively a Christian organization and is interfaith in practice. In subsequent years, as the institute's six-hectare campus north of Tokyo grew with new facilities, men and women from virtually every country in Asia, and eventually many in Africa, the Pacific, and the Americas joined its unique nine-month rural leaders training course. Takami deliberately kept ARI small, accepting only about thirty participants a year. Yet he cast the institute's net so wide that today over 1,200 graduates are spread across the world.

Takami resigned as ARI director in 1990. He died at the Maronie Nursing Care Facility at 10:18 pm on Thursday, September 6. He was 91 years old.

== Honors and awards ==
1974 Honorary Doctor of Divinity – Doane College, Crete, Nebraska
1991 Honorary Doctor of Divinity – St. Olaf College, Northfield, Minnesota
1996 The Ramon Magsaysay Award for International Understanding (often referred to as the Asian Nobel Peace Prize)
2012 William Sloane Coffin '56 Award for Peace and Justice
