= Jeff Zeleny =

American TV journalist (born 1973)

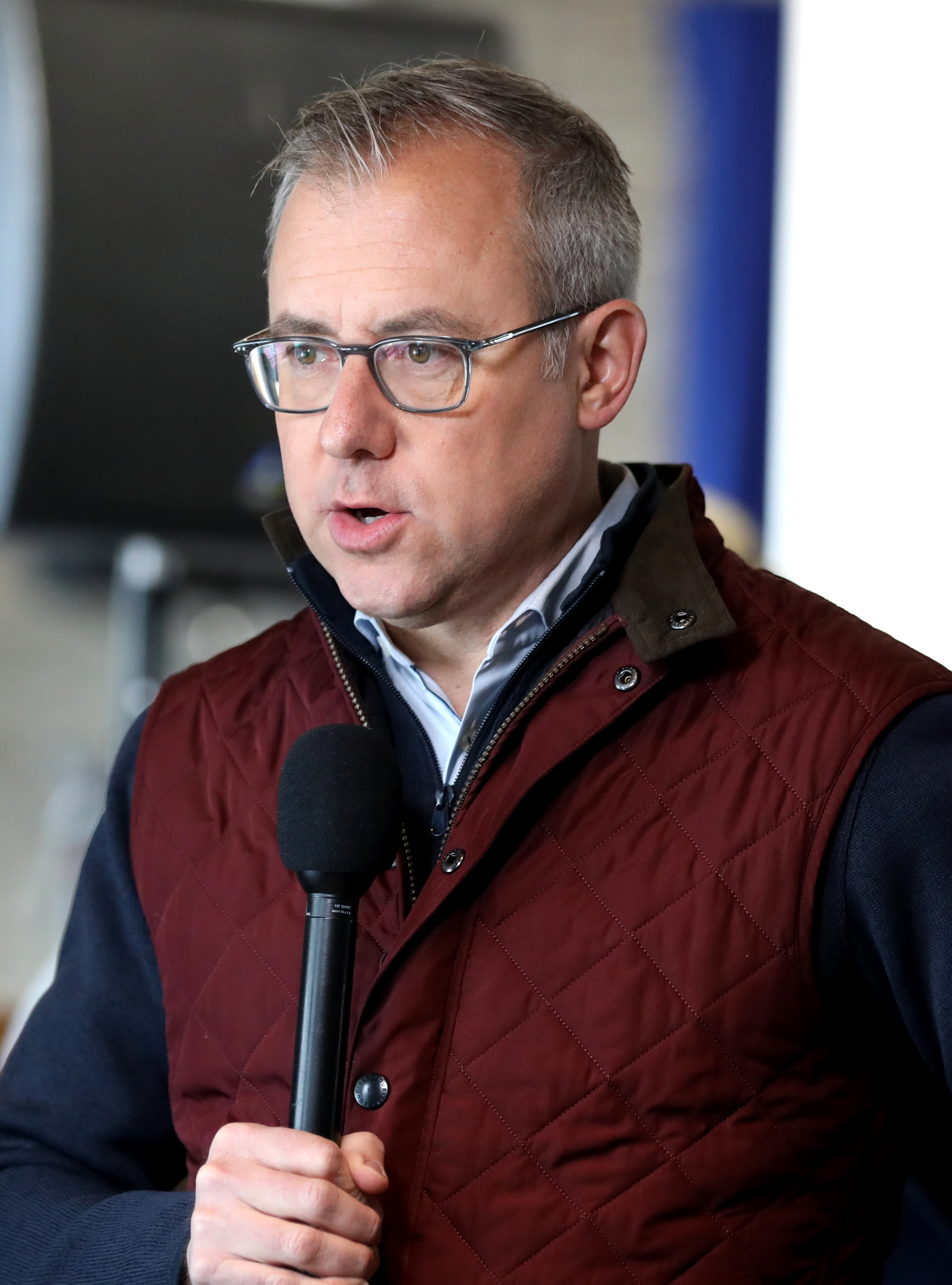
- Zeleny in 2023
- Born: Jeffrey Dean Zeleny; June 10, 1973 (age 53); Exeter, Nebraska, U.S.
- Education: University of Nebraska–Lincoln
- Years active: 1996–present
- Known for: Senior White House Correspondent for CNN

Jeff Zeleny signature

Jeffrey Dean Zeleny (born June 10, 1973) is an American journalist and the chief national affairs correspondent for CNN. He previously was senior Washington correspondent for ABC News. During his newspaper career, he won a Pulitzer Prize with the Chicago Tribune.

== Early life ==
Jeffrey Dean Zeleny was born on June 10, 1973, in Exeter, Nebraska, the son of Diane Naomi (née Yeck) and Robert Dean Zeleny. He has two older brothers, James Robert Zeleny and Michael Jon Zeleny, and was raised with them on the family farm.

Zeleny is also openly gay.

== Education ==
Zeleny was educated at Exeter High School, a public high school in the small town of Exeter, Nebraska. As a student, he contributed sports stories to the York News-Times in neighboring York County.

Zeleny attended the University of Nebraska–Lincoln, where he studied journalism and political science. He graduated in 1996. While at the university, he was the editor of The Daily Nebraskan, the school's newspaper. He also played trumpet in the University of Nebraska Cornhusker Marching Band.

== Career ==
After interning for newspapers including The Wall Street Journal, the Florida Times-Union and the Arkansas Democrat-Gazette in college, Zeleny started working for The Des Moines Register in 1996. Although he originally planned to be a sports reporter, the importance of the Iowa caucuses led to him becoming a political specialist.

In 2000, he left to write for the Chicago Tribune. He covered the presidential campaigns in 2000 and 2004 for the paper. While at the Tribune, he won the Pulitzer Prize for Explanatory Journalism for his work on a series about air traffic control problems nationwide.

In 2006, The New York Times hired him to cover politics, and he covered the 2012 presidential election for the paper, while being its lead reporter. At President Barack Obama's 100-day press conference in April 2009, Zeleny received attention from media blogs for asking President Obama how he was "surprised, troubled, enchanted, and humbled" during his first days in office.

Zeleny was hired in February 2013 by ABC News to be its senior Washington correspondent and to file stories for the website.

Zeleny was honored by The Stuttering Foundation in May 2013.

He joined CNN in March 2015, and in January 2017 was named Senior White House Correspondent. In January 2021, Zeleny was named Chief National Affairs Correspondent.
