= Jefferson Coates =

American Civil War soldier

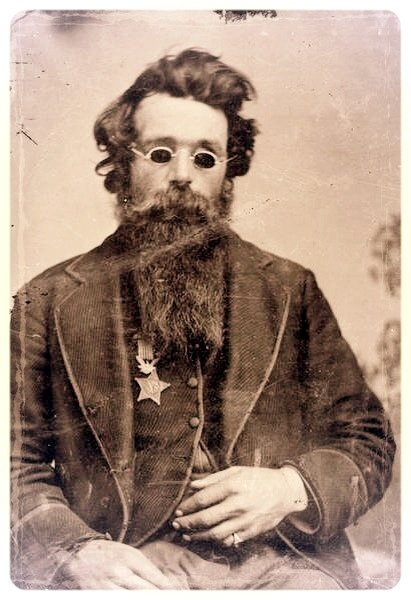
- Born: August 24, 1843; Grant County, Territory of Wisconsin
- Died: January 27, 1880 (aged 36); Dorchester, Nebraska, U.S.
- Burial place: Dorchester Cemetery Dorchester, Nebraska
- Military career
- Allegiance: United States of America; Union
- Branch: United States Army; Union Army
- Service years: 1861 - 1864
- Rank: Brevet Captain
- Unit: 7th Regiment, Wisconsin Volunteer Infantry - Company H
- Conflicts: American Civil War; *Battle of South Mountain; *Battle of Gettysburg
- Awards: Medal of Honor

Francis Jefferson Coates (August 24, 1843 – January 27, 1880) was a soldier in the Union Army during the American Civil War and one of 64 men who received the Medal of Honor for actions during the Battle of Gettysburg.

== Biography ==
Coates was born 24 August 1843 in Grant County, Wisconsin to William Coates and Cynthia Cain. Although born in Grant County, his official residence was listed as Boscobel, Wisconsin.

Coates joined the Union Army on 29 August 1861 (a few days after his 18th birthday), and served with the 7th Wisconsin Infantry. He was wounded while fighting in the Battle of South Mountain and during the Battle of Gettysburg, where he received the Medal of Honor and a brevet promotion to captain for courage in battle. During the Battle of Gettysburg he was shot in the face, causing him to lose both of his eyes. He was mustered out for disability on September 1, 1864, at the end of his term of service.

Despite having become completely blind, Coates learned how to make brooms after the war and married Rachael Sarah Drew April 21, 1867. Together they had five children, and sometime between 1870 and 1873 they moved to Dorchester, Nebraska.

He died of pneumonia in Dorchester on January 27, 1880 and is buried in Dorchester Cemetery.

== Legacy ==
The Jefferson Coates County Campus of the Missouri School for the Blind was named after Coates.

== Medal of Honor citation ==
Citation:

For extraordinary heroism on 1 July 1863, while serving with Company H, 7th Wisconsin Infantry, in action at Gettysburg, Pennsylvania, for unsurpassed courage in battle, where he had both eyes shot out.

== See also ==
- List of Medal of Honor recipients for the Battle of Gettysburg
- List of American Civil War Medal of Honor recipients: A–F
