= Fairmont, Nebraska =

- Village
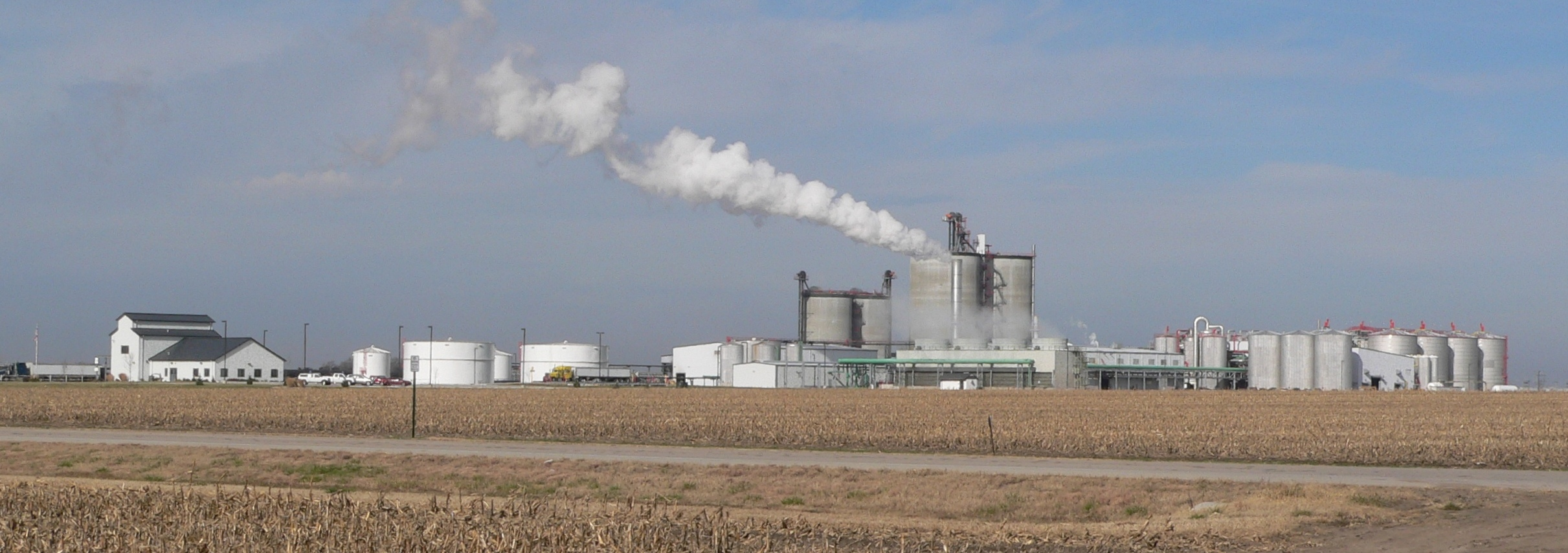
- Flint Hills ethanol-production plant near Fairmont

- Location of Fairmont, Nebraska
- Coordinates: 40°38′09″N 97°35′07″W
- Country: United States
- State: Nebraska
- County: Fillmore

Area
  - Total: 1.15 sq mi (2.98 km^{2})
  - Land: 1.15 sq mi (2.98 km^{2})
  - Water: 0 sq mi (0.00 km^{2})
- Elevation: 1,641 ft (500 m)

Population (2020)
  - Total: 602
  - Estimate (2021): 601
  - Density: 523/sq mi (202/km^{2})
- Time zone: UTC-6 (Central (CST))
  - Summer (DST): UTC-5 (CDT)
- ZIP code: 68354
- Area code: 402
- FIPS code: 31-16550
- GNIS feature ID: 2398854
- Website: www.fairmont-nebraska.org

Fairmont is a village in Fillmore County, Nebraska, United States. The population was 602 at the 2020 census.

== History ==
Fairmont was platted in 1871 when the Burlington & Quincy Railroad was extended to that point. The name was chosen to conform with the alphabetical stops on the new line traveling westward from Lincoln: Berks, Crete, Dorchester, Exeter, Fairmont, Grafton, Huxley, etc. Fairmont is a descriptive name referring to the town's scenic setting at a lofty elevation. By the fall of 1872 Fairmont had a school building, hotels, more stores, lumberyards, and coal and feed yards under construction. The first newspaper, "Fairmont Bulletin" was published in 1872. By 1881 there were three with the introduction of the "Nebraska Bulletin" and the "Nebraska Signal".

One of the first major business enterprises, the Fairmont Creamery Company, was founded in 1884. Corporate offices were moved to Omaha in 1907.

== Geography ==
According to the United States Census Bureau, the village has a total area of 0.82 square miles (2.12 km^{2}), all land.

=== Climate ===
Climate data for Fairmont, Nebraska (1991–2020)
| Month | Jan | Feb | Mar | Apr | May | Jun | Jul | Aug | Sep | Oct | Nov | Dec | Year |
|---|---|---|---|---|---|---|---|---|---|---|---|---|---|
| Mean daily maximum °F (°C) | 34.5 (1.4) | 39.4 (4.1) | 51.6 (10.9) | 62.7 (17.1) | 73.2 (22.9) | 83.8 (28.8) | 87.0 (30.6) | 84.8 (29.3) | 78.7 (25.9) | 65.4 (18.6) | 50.6 (10.3) | 38.2 (3.4) | 62.5 (16.9) |
| Daily mean °F (°C) | 23.8 (−4.6) | 27.9 (−2.3) | 39.1 (3.9) | 49.7 (9.8) | 61.1 (16.2) | 71.5 (21.9) | 75.4 (24.1) | 73.1 (22.8) | 65.3 (18.5) | 52.3 (11.3) | 38.4 (3.6) | 27.7 (−2.4) | 50.4 (10.2) |
| Mean daily minimum °F (°C) | 13.1 (−10.5) | 16.5 (−8.6) | 26.6 (−3.0) | 36.7 (2.6) | 49.0 (9.4) | 59.2 (15.1) | 63.8 (17.7) | 61.4 (16.3) | 51.9 (11.1) | 39.2 (4.0) | 26.2 (−3.2) | 17.2 (−8.2) | 38.4 (3.6) |
| Average precipitation inches (mm) | 0.63 (16) | 0.73 (19) | 1.34 (34) | 2.32 (59) | 4.39 (112) | 4.18 (106) | 3.38 (86) | 3.66 (93) | 2.63 (67) | 2.02 (51) | 1.19 (30) | 0.79 (20) | 27.26 (693) |
| Average snowfall inches (cm) | 7.6 (19) | 5.8 (15) | 3.6 (9.1) | 1.1 (2.8) | 0.0 (0.0) | 0.0 (0.0) | 0.0 (0.0) | 0.0 (0.0) | 0.0 (0.0) | 0.9 (2.3) | 1.8 (4.6) | 3.9 (9.9) | 24.7 (62.7) |
Source: NOAA

== Demographics ==
Historical population
| Census | Pop. | Note | %± |
|---|---|---|---|
| 1880 | 600 | | — |
| 1890 | 1,029 | | 71.5% |
| 1900 | 784 | | −23.8% |
| 1910 | 921 | | 17.5% |
| 1920 | 785 | | −14.8% |
| 1930 | 740 | | −5.7% |
| 1940 | 810 | | 9.5% |
| 1950 | 729 | | −10.0% |
| 1960 | 829 | | 13.7% |
| 1970 | 761 | | −8.2% |
| 1980 | 767 | | 0.8% |
| 1990 | 708 | | −7.7% |
| 2000 | 691 | | −2.4% |
| 2010 | 560 | | −19.0% |
| 2020 | 592 | | 5.7% |
| 2021 (est.) | 601 | ▲ | 1.5% |
U.S. Decennial Census

=== 2010 census ===
As of the census of 2010, there were 560 people, 243 households, and 151 families residing in the village. The population density was 682.9 inhabitants per square mile (263.7/km^{2}). There were 299 housing units at an average density of 364.6 per square mile (140.8/km^{2}). The racial makeup of the village was 97.7% White, 0.5% Native American, 0.2% Asian, 1.4% from other races, and 0.2% from two or more races. Hispanic or Latino of any race were 2.3% of the population.

There were 243 households, of which 24.7% had children under the age of 18 living with them, 49.0% were married couples living together, 8.6% had a female householder with no husband present, 4.5% had a male householder with no wife present, and 37.9% were non-families. 33.3% of all households were made up of individuals, and 17.7% had someone living alone who was 65 years of age or older. The average household size was 2.14 and the average family size was 2.68.

The median age in the village was 50.1 years. 18.6% of residents were under the age of 18; 5% were between the ages of 18 and 24; 18.1% were from 25 to 44; 31.2% were from 45 to 64; and 27% were 65 years of age or older. The gender makeup of the village was 48.2% male and 51.8% female.

=== 2000 census ===
As of the census of 2000, there were 691 people, 275 households, and 171 families residing in the village. The population density was 996.2 inhabitants per square mile (384.6/km^{2}). There were 309 housing units at an average density of 445.5 per square mile (172.0/km^{2}). The racial makeup of the village was 95.80% White, 0.14% African American, 0.72% Native American, 0.14% Asian, 1.45% from other races, and 1.74% from two or more races. Hispanic or Latino of any race were 3.04% of the population.

There were 275 households, out of which 30.2% had children under the age of 18 living with them, 53.1% were married couples living together, 6.9% had a female householder with no husband present, and 37.8% were non-families. 33.8% of all households were made up of individuals, and 21.1% had someone living alone who was 65 years of age or older. The average household size was 2.35 and the average family size was 3.02.

In the village, the population was spread out, with 25.8% under the age of 18, 4.3% from 18 to 24, 23.6% from 25 to 44, 23.0% from 45 to 64, and 23.3% who were 65 years of age or older. The median age was 42 years. For every 100 females, there were 82.3 males. For every 100 females age 18 and over, there were 79.4 males.

As of 2000 the median income for a household in the village was $35,658, and the median income for a family was $41,618. Males had a median income of $31,667 versus $18,125 for females. The per capita income for the village was $15,957. About 8.0% of families and 12.6% of the population were below the poverty line, including 13.8% of those under age 18 and 24.8% of those age 65 or over.

== Notable people ==
- H. H. Atherton, Minnesota state senator; lived in Fairmont
- Frances Maule Bjorkman, feminist activist
