= Exeter, Nebraska =

- Village
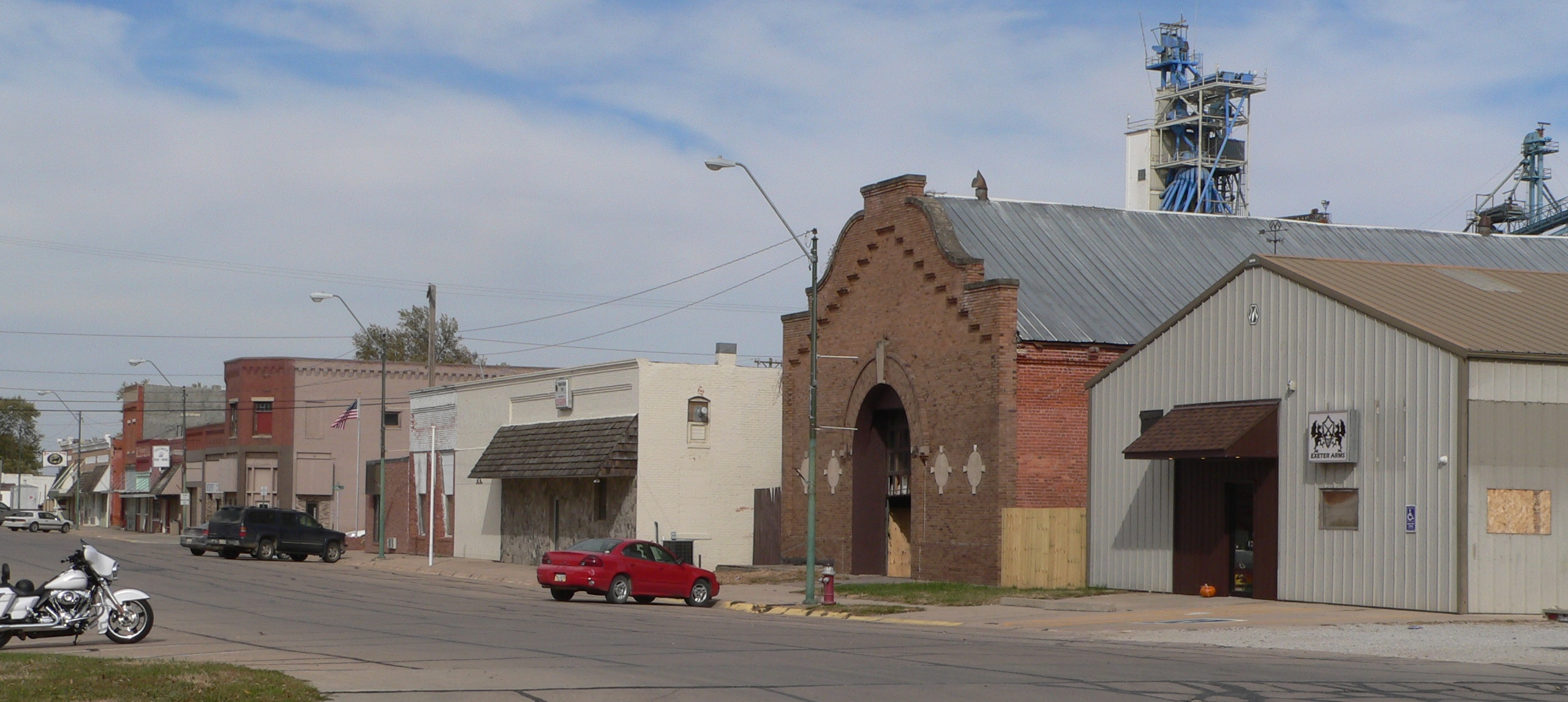
- Downtown Exeter

- Location of Exeter, Nebraska
- Coordinates: 40°38′40″N 97°26′56″W
- Country: United States
- State: Nebraska
- County: Fillmore

Area
  - Total: 0.63 sq mi (1.64 km^{2})
  - Land: 0.63 sq mi (1.64 km^{2})
  - Water: 0 sq mi (0.00 km^{2})
- Elevation: 1,608 ft (490 m)

Population (2020)
  - Total: 516
  - Estimate (2021): 514
  - Density: 815/sq mi (315/km^{2})
- Time zone: UTC-6 (Central (CST))
  - Summer (DST): UTC-5 (CDT)
- ZIP code: 68351
- Area code: 402
- FIPS code: 31-16340
- GNIS feature ID: 2398851
- Website: City of Exeter

Exeter is a village in Fillmore County, Nebraska, United States. The population was 516 at the 2020 census.

== History ==
In 1870, Dr. Horace Greeley Smith and his wife filed a homestead claim at the site of present-day Exeter. In an earlier scouting trip, Smith had determined that the site would lie near the line of the Burlington and Missouri River Railroad as it extended itself westward.

In the fall of 1871, the Burlington and Missouri was completed through Fillmore County. To promote settlement along its line, the railroad established towns at intervals. Towns were named alphabetically as the railroad ran westward from Lincoln. In eastern Fillmore County, a town was established on land donated by Smith and by James Dolan. One of the families that had settled in the area had come from Exeter, New Hampshire, and it was proposed that the town be given that name. It was adopted, as being in keeping with the alphabetical sequence: Crete, Dorchester, Exeter, Fairmont, Grafton, Harvard, Inland, Juniata, Kenesaw, and Lowell.

The railroad advertised the availability of free government land in Nebraska, bringing settlers from the eastern United States, and Czech, German, English, Irish, and Scandinavian immigrants. The town's growth was initially slow, but hastened in the late 1870s. In 1878, two large grain elevators were built and a number of businesses opened; the town's first newspaper, the Enterprise, was established in that year. In 1879, the town was incorporated; by that time, it had sixteen businesses.

== Geography ==
According to the United States Census Bureau, the village has a total area of 0.63 square miles (1.63 km^{2}), all land.

== Education ==
Exeter and the neighboring village of Milligan form part of the Exeter-Milligan School District.

== Demographics ==
Historical population
Census	Pop.	Note	%±
1880	412		—
1890	754		83.0%
1900	673		−10.7%
1910	916		36.1%
1920	910		−0.7%
1930	941		3.4%
1940	841		−10.6%
1950	747		−11.2%
1960	745		−0.3%
1970	759		1.9%
1980	807		6.3%
1990	661		−18.1%
2000	712		7.7%
2010	591		−17.0%
2020	523		−11.5%
2021 (est.)	514	▼	−1.7%
U.S. Decennial Census

=== 2010 census ===
As of the census of 2010, there were 591 people, 236 households, and 151 families residing in the village. The population density was 938.1 inhabitants per square mile (362.2/km^{2}). There were 283 housing units at an average density of 449.2 per square mile (173.4/km^{2}). The racial makeup of the village was 98.6% White, 0.3% Native American, 0.7% from other races, and 0.3% from two or more races. Hispanic or Latino of any race were 3.6% of the population.

There were 236 households, of which 31.8% had children under the age of 18 living with them, 53.4% were married couples living together, 8.5% had a female householder with no husband present, 2.1% had a male householder with no wife present, and 36.0% were non-families. 30.9% of all households were made up of individuals, and 16.9% had someone living alone who was 65 years of age or older. The average household size was 2.38 and the average family size was 3.00.

The median age in the village was 44.7 years. 25% of residents were under the age of 18; 6.2% were between the ages of 18 and 24; 19.5% were from 25 to 44; 29% were from 45 to 64; and 20.5% were 65 years of age or older. The gender makeup of the village was 48.1% male and 51.9% female.

=== 2000 census ===
As of the census of 2000, there were 712 people, 276 households, and 171 families residing in the village. The population density was 1,119.0 inhabitants per square mile (432.0/km^{2}). There were 297 housing units at an average density of 466.8 per square mile (180.2/km^{2}). The racial makeup of the village was 98.17% White, 0.28% Native American, 0.14% Asian, and 1.40% from two or more races. Hispanic or Latino of any race were 0.56% of the population.

There were 276 households, out of which 28.6% had children under the age of 18 living with them, 54.3% were married couples living together, 4.7% had a female householder with no husband present, and 37.7% were non-families. 34.1% of all households were made up of individuals, and 18.5% had someone living alone who was 65 years of age or older. The average household size was 2.42 and the average family size was 3.15.

In the village, the population was spread out, with 27.0% under the age of 18, 3.8% from 18 to 24, 26.3% from 25 to 44, 20.4% from 45 to 64, and 22.6% who were 65 years of age or older. The median age was 40 years. For every 100 females, there were 96.1 males. For every 100 females age 18 and over, there were 87.1 males.

As of 2000 the median income for a household in the village was $34,286, and the median income for a family was $45,234. Males had a median income of $30,547 versus $17,019 for females. The per capita income for the village was $16,438. About 4.3% of families and 9.1% of the population were below the poverty line, including 13.7% of those under age 18 and 15.1% of those age 65 or over.

== Parks and recreation ==
Exeter's city park, also known as Gilbert's Park, is located at 110 E. Maplewood Street. The Aquatic Center, built in 2009, is also located in the park. The park has playground equipment, a ball field, volleyball court, horseshoe pits, and picnic facilities. Exeter also has four neighborhood mini parks located throughout the city with tennis and basketball courts at Edgar Recreation Center in the center of the community.

Annual events include the Easter Egg hunt in the spring, the Firemen's BBQ and Street Dance in the summer and holiday activities in November and December. Summer recreation abounds with league play in softball and baseball for many age groups. Youth can also participate in 4-H, Boy and Girl Scouts, church schools, day camps, and summer reading programs.

== Religion ==
Exeter has three churches: the Exeter Methodist Community Church, the United Church of Christ, and St. Stephen's Catholic Church.

== Notable people ==
- Richard A. Dier, United States federal judge
- Theodore C. Diers, Wyoming state representative and senator
- Jeff Zeleny, Pulitzer Prize-winning journalist, CNN correspondent
- Donald Trauger, nuclear scientist, Worked on Manhattan Project, Former director of Oak Ridge National Laboratory, Author of Horse Power to Nuclear Power
