= Grafton, Nebraska =

- Village
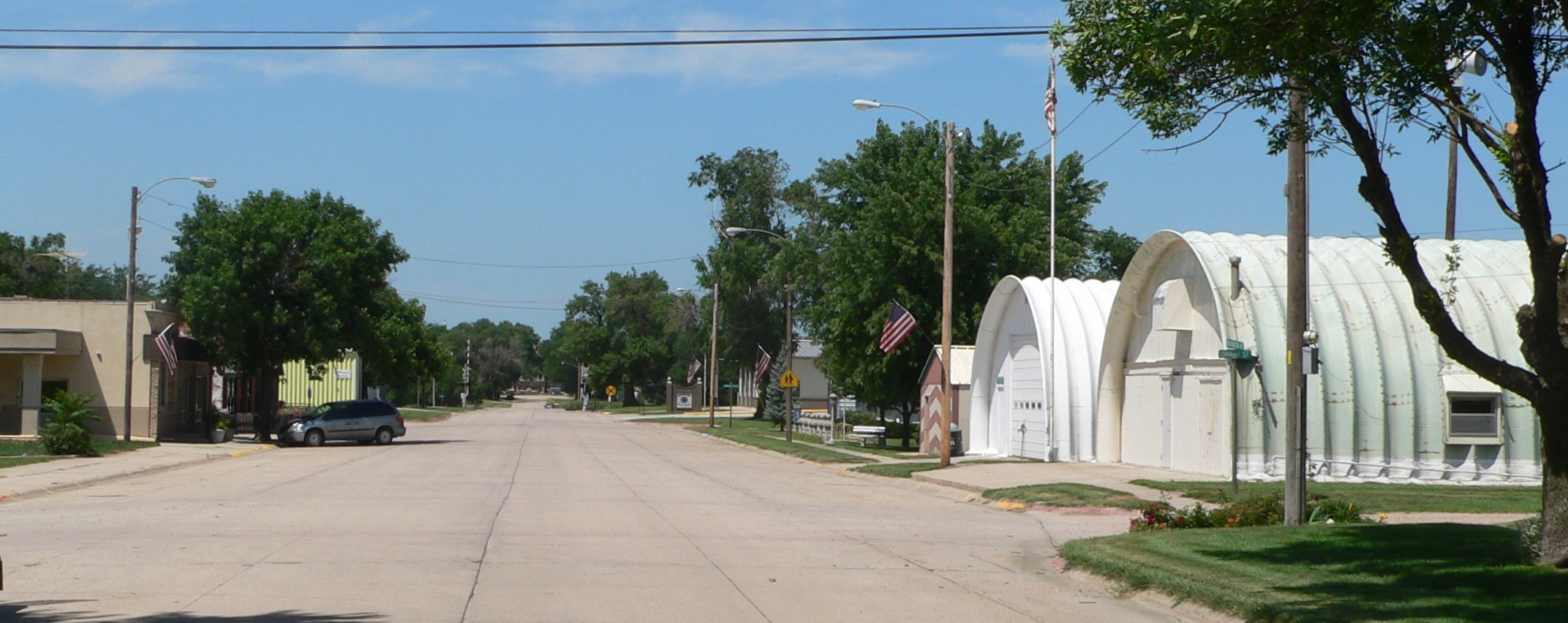
- Downtown Grafton: Washington Avenue, looking north

- Location of Grafton, Nebraska

- Location within Nebraska Location within the United States
- Coordinates: 40°37′47″N 97°42′53″W
- Country: United States
- State: Nebraska
- County: Fillmore
- Township: Grafton

Area
  - Total: 0.35 sq mi (0.90 km^{2})
  - Land: 0.35 sq mi (0.90 km^{2})
  - Water: 0 sq mi (0.00 km^{2})
- Elevation: 1,680 ft (510 m)

Population (2020)
  - Total: 107
  - Estimate (2021): 107
  - Density: 310/sq mi (120/km^{2})
- Time zone: UTC-6 (Central (CST))
  - Summer (DST): UTC-5 (CDT)
- ZIP code: 68365
- Area code: 402
- FIPS code: 31-19455
- GNIS feature ID: 2398184
- Website: grafton-ne.com

Grafton is a village in Fillmore County, Nebraska, United States. The population was 107 at the 2020 census.

== History ==
Grafton was founded in 1874. It was likely named after the town of Grafton, Massachusetts. The name was also chosen to conform with the alphabetical stops on the new Burlington & Quincy Railroad line traveling westward from Lincoln: Berks, Crete, Dorchester, Exeter, Fairmont, Grafton, Huxley, etc.

== Geography ==
According to the United States Census Bureau, the village has a total area of 0.35 square miles (0.91 km^{2}), all land.

== Demographics ==
Historical population
Census	Pop.	Note	%±
1900	287		—
1910	353		23.0%
1920	324		−8.2%
1930	284		−12.3%
1940	240		−15.5%
1950	159		−33.7%
1960	171		7.5%
1970	128		−25.1%
1980	185		44.5%
1990	167		−9.7%
2000	152		−9.0%
2010	126		−17.1%
2020	106		−15.9%
2021 (est.)	107	▲	0.9%
U.S. Decennial Census

=== 2010 census ===
As of the census of 2010, there were 126 people, 62 households, and 35 families living in the village. The population density was 360.0 inhabitants per square mile (139.0/km^{2}). There were 75 housing units at an average density of 214.3 per square mile (82.7/km^{2}). The racial makeup of the village was 99.2% White and 0.8% African American.

There were 62 households, of which 14.5% had children under the age of 18 living with them, 43.5% were married couples living together, 6.5% had a female householder with no husband present, 6.5% had a male householder with no wife present, and 43.5% were non-families. 35.5% of all households were made up of individuals, and 17.7% had someone living alone who was 65 years of age or older. The average household size was 2.03 and the average family size was 2.57.

The median age in the village was 52 years. 16.7% of residents were under the age of 18; 4.8% were between the ages of 18 and 24; 13.6% were from 25 to 44; 42.8% were from 45 to 64; and 22.2% were 65 years of age or older. The gender makeup of the village was 47.6% male and 52.4% female.

=== 2000 census ===
As of the census of 2000, there were 152 people, 68 households, and 46 families living in the village. The population density was 438.8 inhabitants per square mile (169.4/km^{2}). There were 72 housing units at an average density of 207.9 per square mile (80.3/km^{2}). The racial makeup of the village was 100.00% White.

There were 68 households, out of which 20.6% had children under the age of 18 living with them, 55.9% were married couples living together, 8.8% had a female householder with no husband present, and 30.9% were non-families. 27.9% of all households were made up of individuals, and 11.8% had someone living alone who was 65 years of age or older. The average household size was 2.22 and the average family size was 2.64.

In the village, the population was spread out, with 19.7% under the age of 18, 7.2% from 18 to 24, 21.1% from 25 to 44, 30.3% from 45 to 64, and 21.7% who were 65 years of age or older. The median age was 46 years. For every 100 females, there were 102.7 males. For every 100 females age 18 and over, there were 96.8 males.

As of 2000 the median income for a household in the village was $27,500, and the median income for a family was $36,250. Males had a median income of $35,625 versus $19,250 for females. The per capita income for the village was $16,348. None of the families and 4.9% of the population were living below the poverty line, including no under eighteens and 6.3% of those over 64.
