= Grafton Cinema =

Cinema in Dublin, Ireland

Coordinates: 53°20′29″N 6°15′37″W

- Grafton Picture House
- Interactive map of Grafton Cinema
- Address: Dublin; Ireland
- Current use: HMV (music retailer)

Construction
- Opened: 11 April 1911
- Closed: 1 December 1973
- Reopened: 18 September 1959
- Architect: Richard Orpen

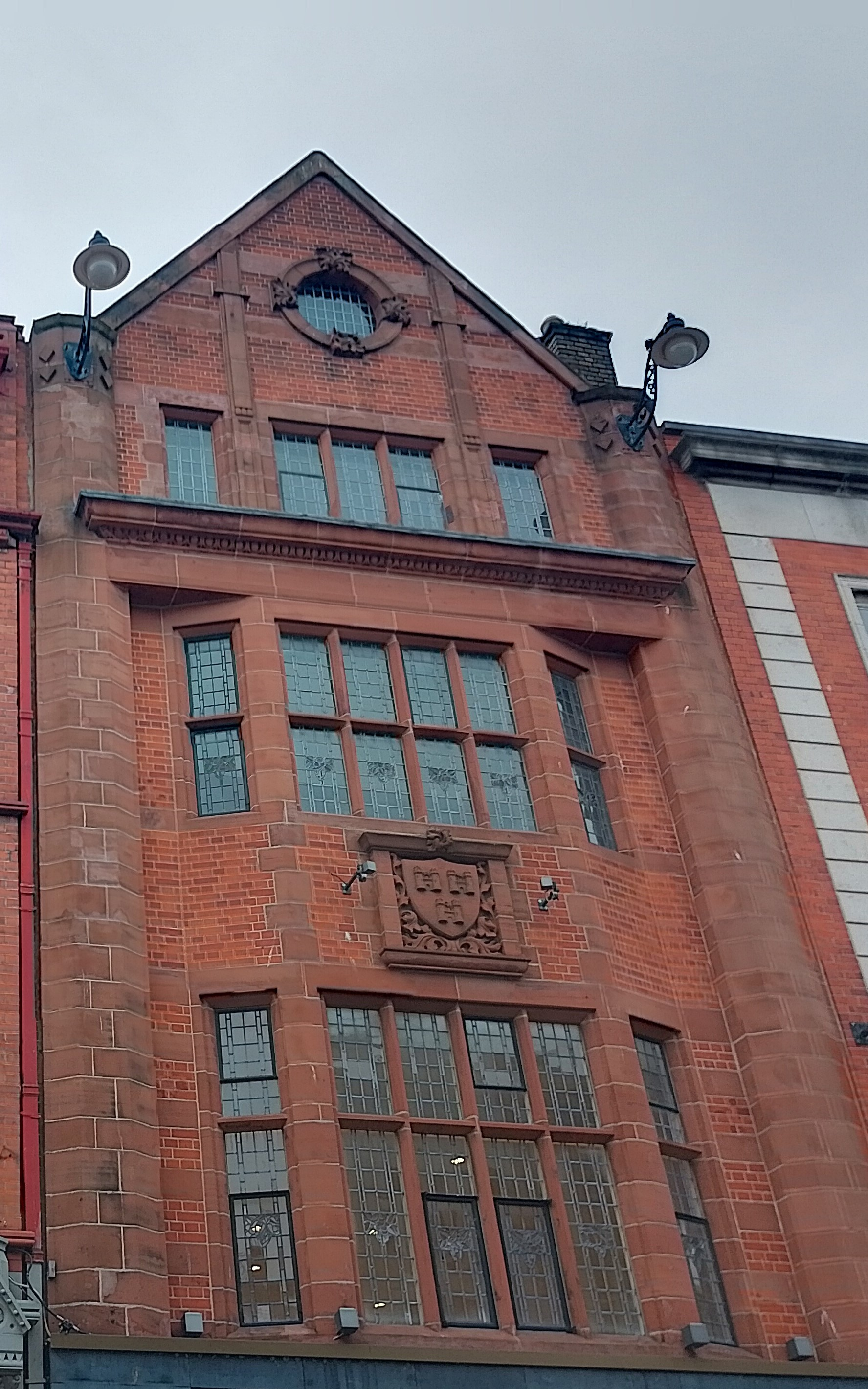
Grafton Cinema

The Grafton Cinema was a film theatre on Grafton Street in Dublin, Ireland which operated for over sixty years.

== Early years ==
Known originally as the Grafton Picture House, the cinema opened on Easter Monday, 11 April 1911, at 72 Grafton Street. It was designed by architect, Richard Orpen. Continuous performances ran from 12.00 to 10.30pm each day. Admission was one shilling for adults; children were charged half-price. Among the films shown during its first year was The Crusaders, which depicted the medieval conquest of Jerusalem by European armies. Dublin received its first presentation of "talking pictures" in April 1914 when Thomas Edison's Kinetophone technology was demonstrated at the Grafton. In late 1913 or early 1914, nationalists disrupted the programme on several occasions due to the inclusion of a British Army recruitment film.

Robert Flaherty's documentary film, Man of Aran, received its Irish première at the Grafton on 6 May 1934. Éamon de Valera, President of the Executive Council of the Irish Free State attended, as well as various dignitaries from politics and the arts.

== Relaunch ==
On 18 September 1959, the Grafton Cinema was relaunched as a news and cartoon cinema by its new owner, the British chain, Capital and Provincial News Theatres Ltd. Instead of the full-length feature films which had previously been the staple of the cinema's listings, it now ran continuous programmes of newsreels, cartoons, and short films featuring comedy acts such as The Three Stooges and Joe McDoakes.

During the 1960s, the Grafton also became a popular late-night venue for folk and traditional Irish music concerts, featuring artists such as sean-nós singer, Seosamh Ó hÉanaí, fiddler, Martin Fay, and tin whistle player, Seán Potts. In August 1963, The Dubliners made one of their first appearances together when they performed in a midnight concert at the cinema. Six months later, Ewan MacColl and Peggy Seeger made their Dublin début at the Grafton.

== Closure ==
By the early 1970s, rental incomes and property values in Grafton Street had risen significantly due to intensifying competition within the retail sector in one of the city's prime shopping districts. Vendors of freehold properties on the street, such as the Grafton Cinema, could realise substantial capital gains. This was borne out in November 1973 when the cinema was sold for £400,000, regarded as a high price at the time. On 1 December, its fifteen staff were made redundant and the Grafton Cinema closed its doors for the last time. Shortly afterwards it was converted into a retail outlet. The site is currently occupied by a branch of The White Company, a home decor and furniture retailer.
