= Grafton (name) =

Grafton is both a surname and a given name. Notable people with the name include:

== Surname ==
- Anthony Grafton (born 1950), American historian
- C. W. Grafton (1909–1982), American novelist
- Frederick William Grafton (1816–1890), British industrialist and politician
- Jimmy Grafton (1916–1986), English writer, producer and theatrical agent
- Joseph Grafton (1757–1836), founder of the Newton Theological Institution
- Nathan Grafton (1826–1915), American politician and manufacturer
- Peter Grafton (1916–2012), British Liberal Party politician and surveyor
- Richard Grafton (died 1573), English printer and historian
- Sue Grafton (1940–2017), American author

== Given name ==
- Grafton Baker (c. 1806–1881), first chief justice of the Supreme Court of the New Mexico Territory
- Grafton D. Cushing (1864–1939), American politician
- Grafton Green (1872–1947), American jurist
- Grafton K. Mintz (1925–1983), American copy editor
- Grafton Njootli (1947–1999), Canadian politician
- Grafton Elliot Smith (1871–1937), Australian anatomist
