= Raymonn Adams =

American gridiron football player (born 1978)

Raymonn "Goldie" Adams
Profile
- Position: Running back

Personal information
- Born: October 23, 1978 (age 48); Long Beach, California, U.S.
- Listed height: 5 ft 8 in (1.73 m)
- Listed weight: 206 lb (93 kg)

Career information
- High school: Long Beach Polytechnic (Long Beach, California)
- College: Doane

Career history
- 2002: Calgary Stampeders
- 2003: Ottawa Renegades
- 2003: New York Jets*
- 2004: Ottawa Renegades
- * Offseason or practice squad member only

Raymonn Doniciansher "Goldie" Adams (born October 23, 1978) is an American former professional football running back and return specialist who played for the Calgary Stampeders and Ottawa Renegades of the Canadian Football League. He was signed by the Stampeders in 2002 and played six regular season games for them, primarily serving as a punt and kick returner. He continued in this role with the Renegades, playing 18 games during the 2003 and 2004 seasons. He returned 43 punts and 52 kickoffs before retiring from the CFL. In 2003, he was signed by the New York Jets but was released before the start of the regular season.
