= New Grafton, Nova Scotia =

Community in Nova Scotia, Canada

Coordinates: 44°24′40.4″N 65°10′44.9″W

New Grafton in Nova Scotia

New Grafton is a community in the Canadian province of Nova Scotia, located in the Region of Queens Municipality.
