= York News-Times =

York News Times
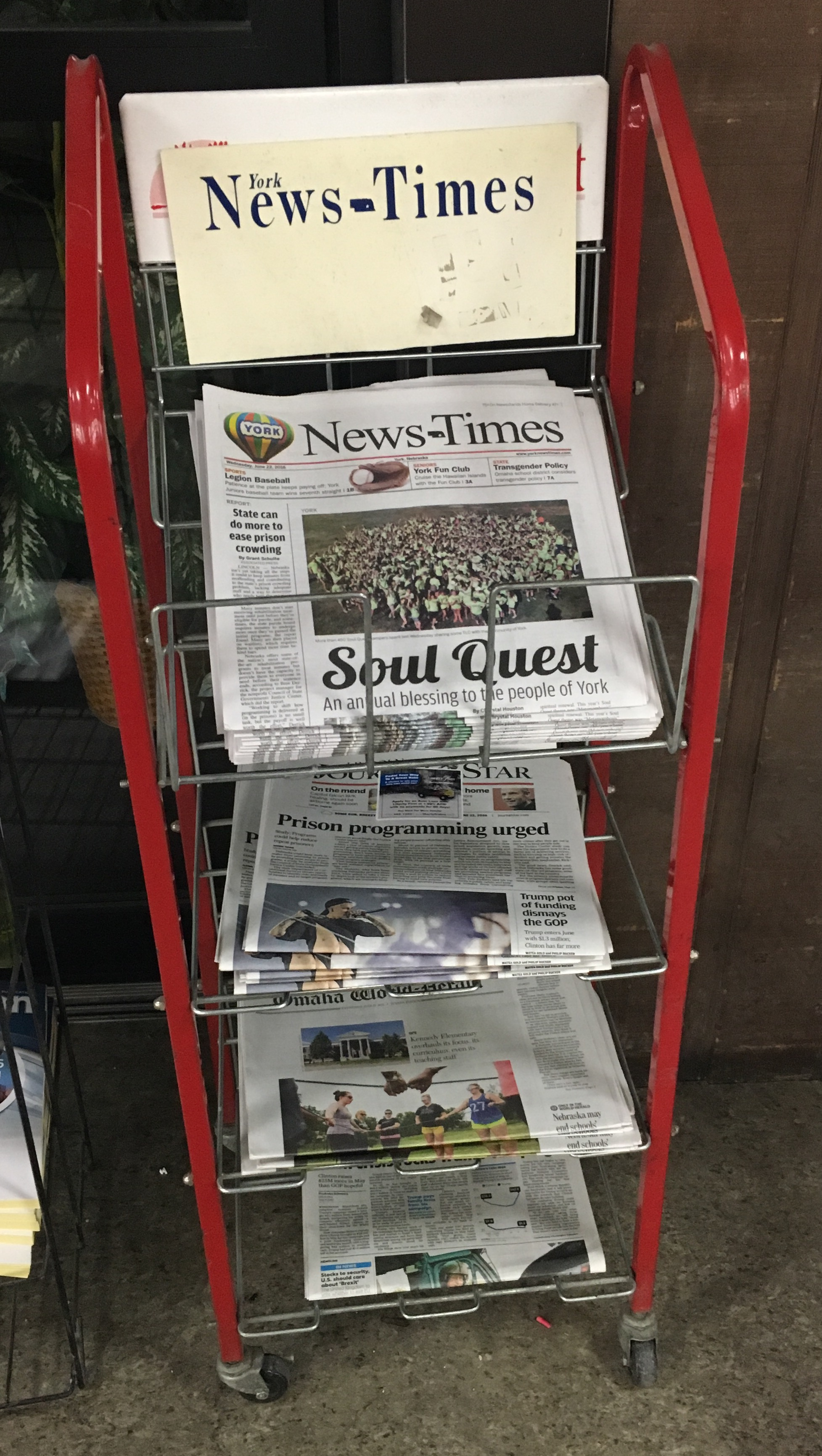
- Type: Daily newspaper
- Format: Broadsheet
- Owner: Lee Enterprises
- Publisher: Carrie Colburn
- Editor: Melanie Wilkinson
- Founded: 1887
- Headquarters: 327 Platte Ave, York, NE United States
- Circulation: 2,700 Daily (as of 2023)
- OCLC number: 31619133
- Website: yorknewstimes.com

The York News-Times is a daily newspaper published in York, Nebraska. It is the newspaper of record for York County and surrounding counties in the Rainwater Basin region.

Part of Berkshire Hathaway's BH Media Group, the News-Times is published five mornings per week, with Sunday and Monday off. In March 2016, Carrie Colburn was named publisher.

== History ==
In the late 1800s, York fielded a number of newspapers. On January 1, 1883, the York Democrat was created from a previous paper known as the York Tribune, established in 1872. The York Republican was another newspaper that flourished during this time period and was notable for its large circulation. By the early 1900s, a series of mergers resulted in the York News-Times becoming the last surviving newspaper from the local media boom period.

In 1995, the newspaper's longtime owner, Stauffer Communications, was sold to Morris Communications. In 2007, Morris sold the News-Times and several other newspapers to GateHouse Media. The News-Times and its nearby sister paper, The Grand Island Independent, were sold to the Omaha World-Herald in 2008; the World-Herald and its subsidiary papers were purchased by Berkshire Hathaway in 2011.

In 2020, Berkshire Hathaway sold the newspaper and 30 other daily papers to Lee Enterprises as part of a $140 million cash deal.

== Modern era ==
Although print circulation is still below 3,500, the combination of print and digital readership means the News-Times is currently experiencing the most readership in its history. Its website has won the Nebraska Press Association award for "Best Newspaper Website" five times.

In the concern over fake news websites stemming from the 2016 United States presidential election, the York News-Times was sometimes mistakenly cited as a "fake newspaper," largely due to its name being similar to that of the well-known New York Times.

Among the journalists who have worked at the paper is Pulitzer Prize-winner Jeff Zeleny.
