= Temple Grafton =

Village in Warwickshire, England

Coordinates: 52.191338°N 1.822102°W

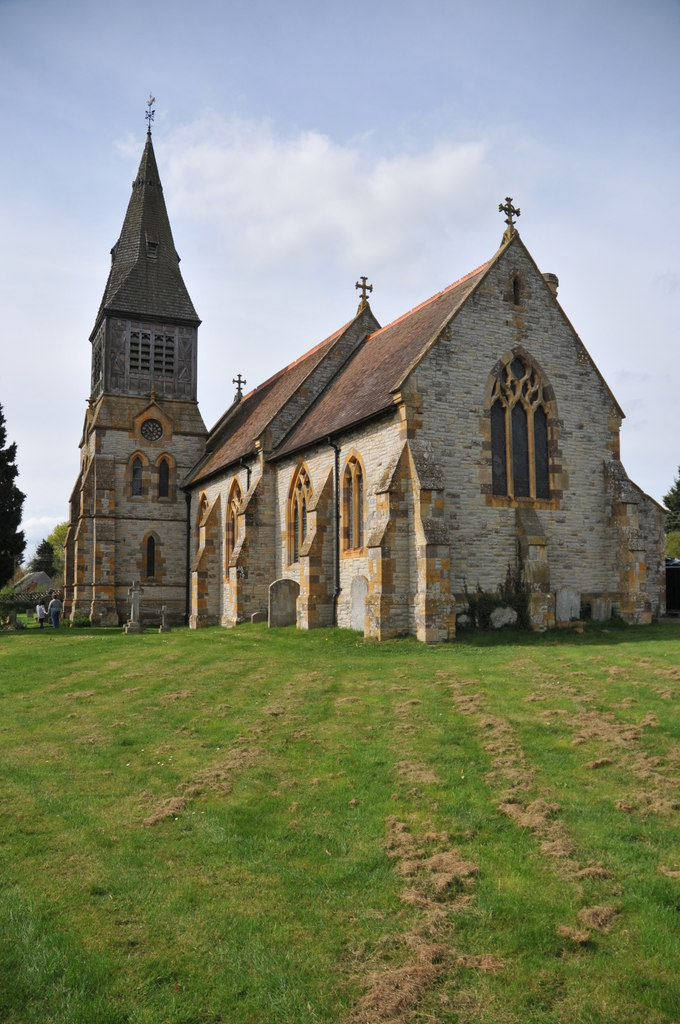
- St Andrew's Church, Temple Grafton

- Location within Warwickshire
- Population: 462 (2011 Census)
- OS grid reference: SP 1226 5480
- District: Stratford-on-Avon
- Shire county: Warwickshire
- Region: West Midlands
- Country: England
- Sovereign state: United Kingdom
- Post town: ALCESTER
- Postcode district: B49
- Dialling code: 01789
- Police: Warwickshire
- Fire: Warwickshire
- Ambulance: West Midlands
- UK Parliament: Stratford-on-Avon

Temple Grafton is a village and civil parish in the Stratford-on-Avon district of Warwickshire, England, situated about 4 miles (6.4 km) east of Alcester and 14 miles (23 km) west of the county town of Warwick. The place name is misleading, the Knights Templar never having any association with the place but owing to a naming error made in the time of Henry VIII the mistake has been perpetuated. During the reign of Richard I the estate in fact belonged to the Knights Hospitaller. During the reign of Edward III in 1347 the village was recorded as Grafton Superior while neighbouring Ardens Grafton was named Inferior.

== History ==
Temple Grafton was alleged to have been granted to Evesham Abbey by Ceolred King of Mercia in 710. But it is also said to have been given by Edward the Confessor in 1055, and is included among the 36 manors acquired by Abbot Ethelwig (1055–1077); the 8th-century charter is probably a forgery made about this time to strengthen the title. Of these 36 manors, 28, including Grafton, were seized by Bishop Odo of Bayeux, quasi lupus rapax, (like a ravaging wolf) after Ethelwig's death. The village is then recorded in the Domesday Book as part of the lands of Osbern son of Richard, having been given to him by Odo, where the entry states, "In Ferncombe Hundred Gilbert holds 5 hides in (Grastone) Temple Grafton. Land for 5 ploughs. In lordship 2; 4 slaves; 6 villagers with a priest and 6 smallholders with 5 ploughs. Meadow, 24 acres. The value was £3; now £4. Merwin, Scroti, Toti and Tosti held it freely before 1066."

The first mention of the Knights Hospitallers here occurs in 1189, when they received a grant of land from Henry de Grafton. In 1275–76 they were holding 2 carucates, formerly belonging to Ralph and Bernard de Grafton, which were declared to have evaded taxation for forty years. In 1316 they held the manor for a knight's fee of Guy de Beauchamp, Earl of Warwick. By 1338 they had a Preceptory here, which was united with that of Balsall, and they continued lords of the manor until the suppression of their Order in 1540 when the manor passed to the Crown.

It is known as one of the Shakespeare villages. William Shakespeare is said to have joined a party of Stratford folk which set itself to outdrink a drinking club at Bidford-on-Avon, and as a result of his labours in that regard to have fallen asleep under the crab tree of which a descendant is still called Shakespeare's tree. When morning dawned his friends wished to renew the encounter but he wisely said "No I have drunk with "Piping Pebworth, Dancing Marston, Haunted Hillboro', Hungry Grafton, Dodging Exhall, Papist Wixford, Beggarly Broom and Drunken Bidford" and so, presumably, I will drink no more." The story is said to date from the 17th century but of its truth or of any connection of the story or the verse to Shakespeare there is no evidence. The hungry ephitet refers to the poverty of the soil.

It is also known for a passage in the Diocese of Worcester records: an entry for 1582 mentions a marriage license being issued to one William Shaxpere and an Anne Whateley of Temple Grafton. The following day, Fulk Sandells and John Richardson, friends of the Hathaway family from Stratford-upon-Avon, signed a surety of £40 as a financial guarantee for the wedding of "William Shagspere and Anne Hathwey," referring to the playwright and poet of the 1590s–1610s, and his wife Anne (née Hathaway), of Shottery. This has caused speculation; Temple Grafton is only 5 mi (8 km) west of Stratford, and it is speculated that Shakespeare may have wished to marry Anne of Temple Grafton, only to be forced to marry Anne Hathaway (who was pregnant) instead. There is no other "William Shakespeare" known to have been living in the region at that time. Other scholars theorise that "Whateley" is simply a clerical error for "Hathaway;" spelling of English personal names was very variable in the Elizabethan period. Hathaway and Shakespeare married shortly after, and remained married until his death in 1616, having three children; there are no other records of Anne Whateley.

== Governance ==
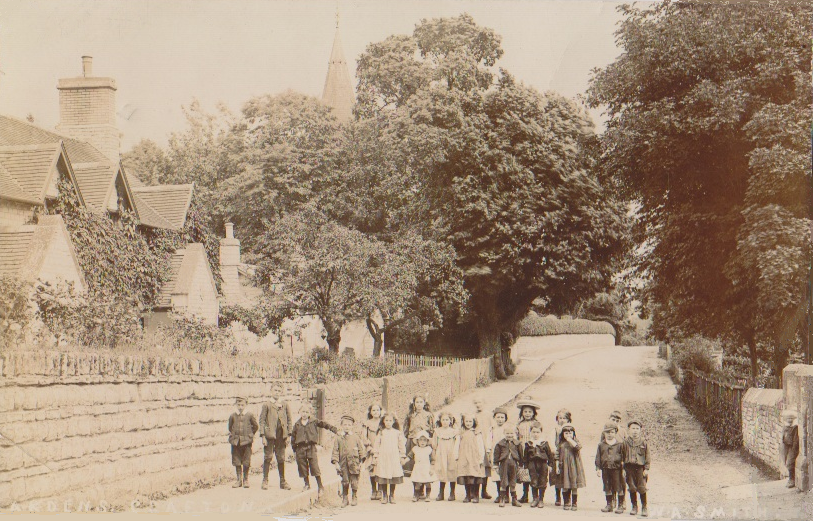
Temple Grafton, early 20th century

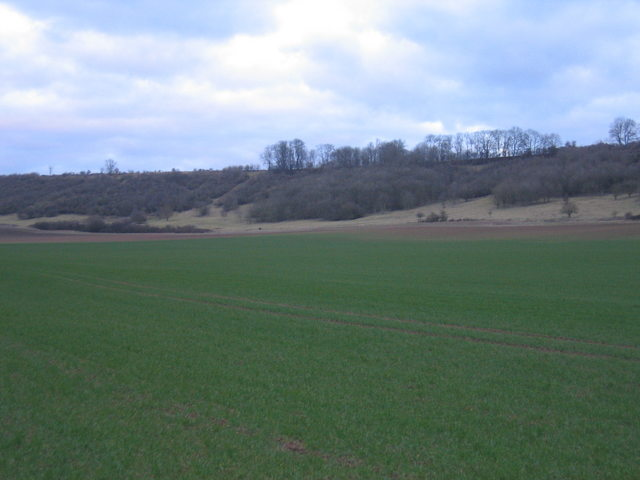
Temple and Arden Grafton are above the escarpment

Temple Grafton is part of the Bardon ward of Stratford-on-Avon District Council and represented by Councillor Valerie Hobbs, Conservative Party. Nationally it is part of Stratford-on-Avon constituency, whose current MP is Nadhim Zahawi of the Conservative Party.

== Notable buildings ==
The parish church of St. Andrew was entirely rebuilt in 1875 to a design by Frederick Preedy on the site of an older edifice. Consisting of a chancel with a north organ chamber and vestry, nave, north aisle, and a south-west tower serving as a porch, it is built of lias stone with sandstone dressings, and has tiled roofs. On the north wall of the chancel is a repainted stone shield of arms of the 17th century with the six quarterings of the Woodchurch-Clarke family, impaling the quarterly coat of De la Hay, Winterbourne, Sheldon, and Ruding. In the organ chamber is a 17th-century oak chest with panelled sides, a carved top-rail, and a panelled lid.

Another chest is of the 18th or early 19th century. The blunder regarding the Knights Templar is repeated in the symbols of that order being depicted in the glass and encaustic tiles of the interior. Many scholars believe it to be the place where William Shakespeare married Anne Hathaway, since records of the marriage do not appear in Stratford itself, and a licence was issued for Shakespeare to marry in Temple Grafton. However marriage records for the period have been lost. Grafton Court is a nineteenth century Gothic Revival house with lodge gatehouses, set off New Road. It was built on the site of an older moated manor house. The architect was J. S. Alder. The house was used for some time as a hotel before being converted into apartments.

== Sports and leisure ==
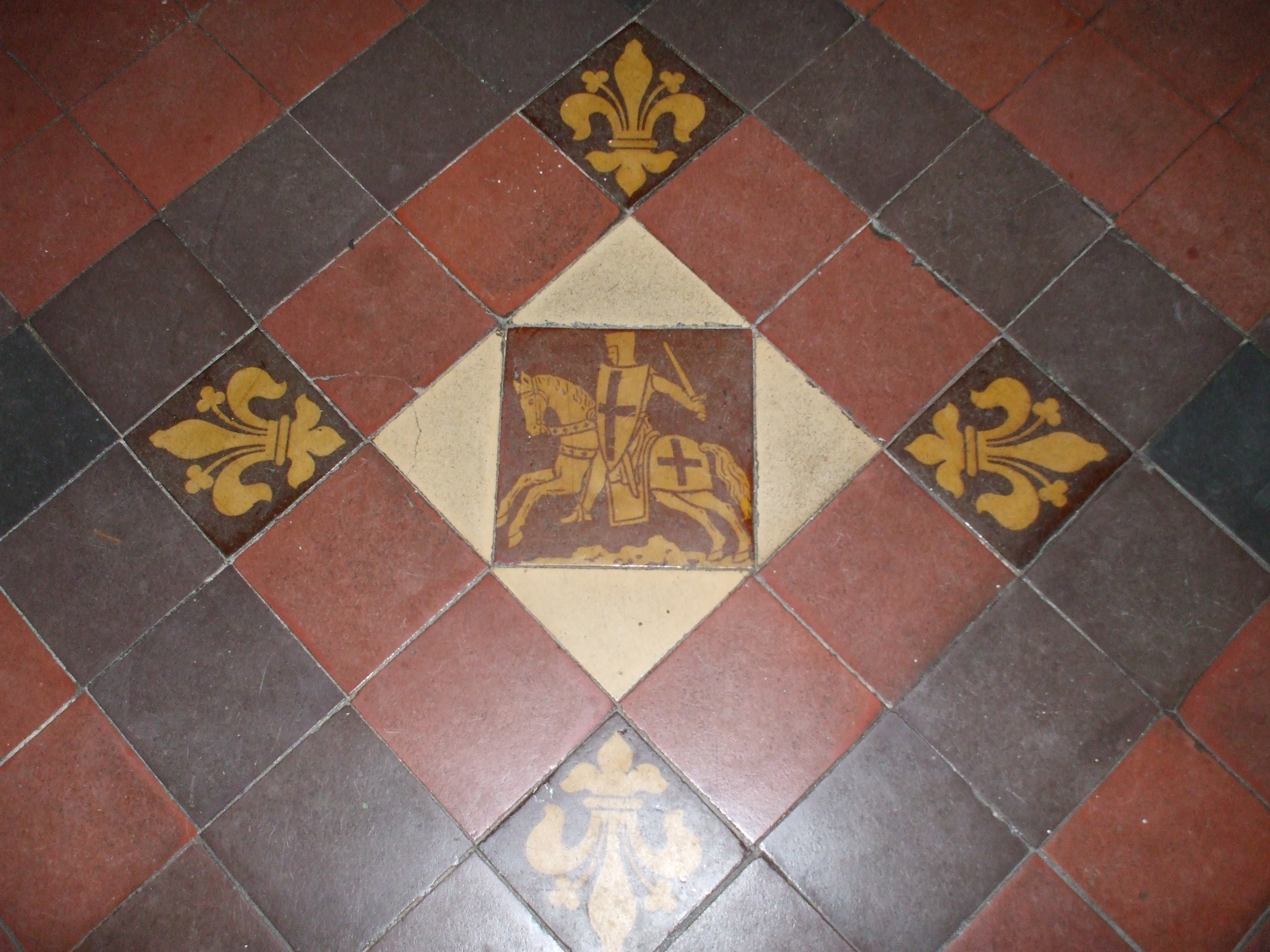
Encaustic tile depicting a Knight Templar

Temple Grafton Cricket Club, is situated in the grounds of Grafton Court. They currently have two Saturday sides competing in the Cotswold Hills League, as well as regular Sunday friendly fixtures, a full calendar of midweek 20-over social games, junior cricket and a newly formed Ladies team. The village also has a Pub (Blue Boar) and a Bus stop. Situated on New Road is Graftons village hall serving both Temple Grafton & Ardens Grafton. It is a large hall which seats 120 people in rows or 100 at tables, or 60 if the stage is in place. The reception porch has access for the disabled.

== Geography ==
The land rises to an altitude of over 300 ft. in the northern part of the parish and slopes down to about 180 ft. by the river-bank at Hillborough, 2 miles to the south. The village, with the church, stands on the edge of the hill, commanding views across the valley to Bredon Hill and the Cotswolds.

== Education ==
Located on Church Bank is Temple Grafton Church of England Primary School having 102 pupils on its roll. The nearest secondary schools are located in Alcester 4 miles (6.4 km) or Stratford-upon-Avon 6 miles (9.7 km).

School	Compulsory education stage	School website	Ofsted details
Temple Grafton Church of England Primary School	Primary	Temple Grafton Church of England School	Ofsted details for unique reference number 125647
