= Ardens Grafton =

Coordinates: 52.187°N 1.832°W

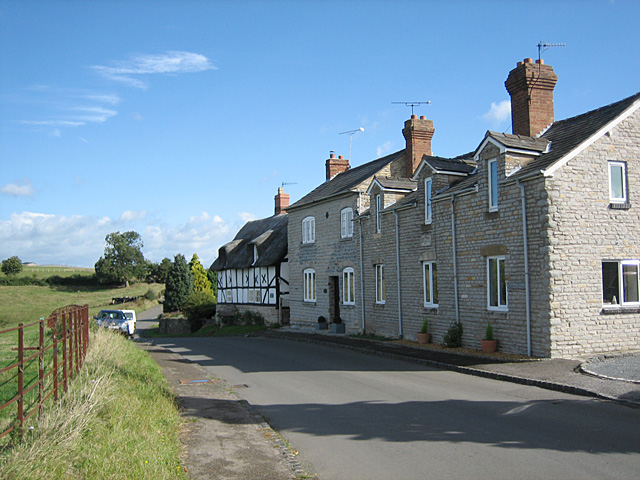
- Ardens Grafton

- Location within Warwickshire
- OS grid reference: SP1154
- District: Stratford-on-Avon
- Shire county: Warwickshire
- Region: West Midlands
- Country: England
- Sovereign state: United Kingdom
- Post town: ALCESTER
- Postcode district: B49
- Dialling code: 01789
- Police: Warwickshire
- Fire: Warwickshire
- Ambulance: West Midlands
- UK Parliament: Stratford-on-Avon

Ardens Grafton is a hamlet or small village in the Stratford-on-Avon District of Warwickshire, England, situated about 4 miles (6.4 km) east of Alcester and 14 miles (23 km) west of the county town of Warwick. It has a main street and consists mostly of houses constructed of local stone with tiled roofs, with the exception of two properties, 'Manor Cottage' and 'Chapel House' both of which have timber-framed walls and a thatched roof. Two other buildings retain fragments of ancient framing. During the reign of Edward III in 1347 the village was recorded as Grafton Inferior while neighbouring Temple Grafton (where the population details can be found), 0.50 miles (0.80 km) to the East, was named Superior Other designations used during the Middle Ages were Nether Grafton, Grafton Inferior or Grafton Minor whilst the larger village of Temple Grafton was distinguished as Over Grafton, Grafton Superior, Church Grafton, or Grafton Major. A reference to 'Temple Grafton alias Ardens Grafton' occurs in 1650.

== History ==
Grafton Minor occurs in a grant to Evesham Abbey by Ufa, Sheriff of Warwickshire, dated 973. As it is included among Ethelwig, Abbot of Evesham's acquisitions ('Alia Graftun') it may in the meantime have been lost by the monastery, and with Temple Grafton seized by the Odo, Bishop of Bayeux, quasi lupus rapax, (like a ravaging wolf) after Ethelwig's death. It is most probably to be identified with the 3 hides and 1 virgate in 'Graston' which the Domesday Book records among the possessions of William Fitz-Corbucion; Leuric and Eileua held it of him and before the Norman Conquest they had held it freely. "Leofric and Aelfeva hold 3 hides and 1 virgate in Graston (Ardens Grafton). Land for 2 ploughs. In lordship 1; 2 slaves; 1 villager and 3 smallholders with 1 plough. Meadow 4 acres. The value was 40s; now 30s. They also held it themselves freely."

== Governance ==
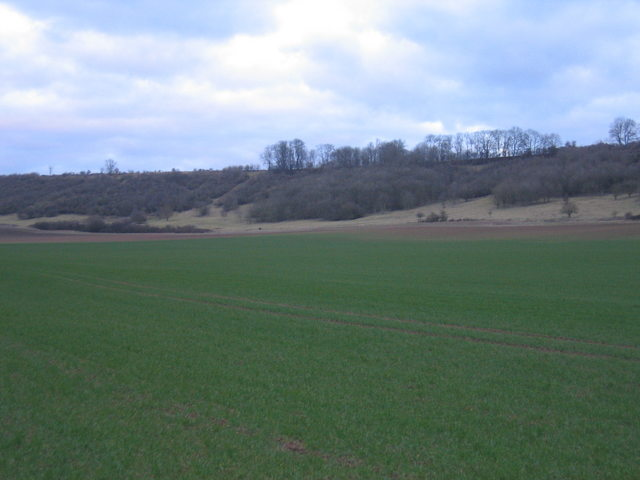
Arden and Temple Grafton are above the escarpment

Ardens Grafton is part of the Bardon ward of Stratford-on-Avon District Council and represented by Councillor Robert Vaudry, Conservative Party. Nationally it is part of Stratford-on-Avon (UK Parliament constituency), whose current MP is Nadhim Zahawi of the Conservative Party. Prior to Brexit in 2020, it was part of the West Midlands electoral region of the European Parliament.

== Geography ==
The land rises to an altitude of over 300 ft. in the northern part of the parish and slopes down to about 180 ft. by the river-bank at Hillborough, 2 miles (3.2 km) to the south. The hamlet stands on the edge of the hill, commanding views across the valley to Bredon Hill and the Cotswolds.

== Education ==
The nearest Primary School is Temple Grafton Church of England Primary School having 102 pupils on its roll. The nearest secondary schools are located in Alcester 4 miles (6.4 km) or Stratford-upon-Avon 6 miles (9.7 km).

School	Compulsory education stage	School website	Ofsted details
Temple Grafton Church of England Primary School	Primary	Temple Grafton Church of England School	Ofsted details for unique reference number 125647
