= Grafton Township, Walsh County, North Dakota =

Coordinates: 48.4125°N 97.4731°W

Grafton Township
- Township
- Interactive map of Grafton Township
- Country: United States
- State: North Dakota
- County: Walsh County

Area
  - Total: 34.300 sq mi (88.837 km^{2})
  - Land: 34.300 sq mi (88.837 km^{2})
  - Water: 0 sq mi (0 km^{2}) 0%

Population
  - Total: 327
- Time zone: UTC-6 (CST)
  - Summer (DST): UTC-5 (CDT)

Grafton Township is a township in Walsh County, North Dakota, United States. 51.1% (167) of the population are male, and the other 48.9% (160) are female. As of the 2010 census, the population of Grafton Township is 327.

== See also ==
- Walsh County, North Dakota
