= Grafton Township, Fillmore County, Nebraska =

Grafton Township
- Township
- Location in Fillmore County
- Coordinates: 40°39′36″N 097°46′34″W
- Country: United States
- State: Nebraska
- County: Fillmore

Area
  - Total: 36.31 sq mi (94.03 km^{2})
  - Land: 36.31 sq mi (94.03 km^{2})
  - Water: 0 sq mi (0 km^{2}) 0%
- Elevation: 1,686 ft (514 m)

Population (2020)
  - Total: 222 ▼
  - Density: 6.11/sq mi (2.36/km^{2})
- GNIS feature ID: 0838030

Grafton Township is one of fifteen townships in Fillmore County, Nebraska, United States. The population was 222 at the 2020 census.

The village of Grafton lies within the township.

== See also ==
- County government in Nebraska
