= Doane University =

Private liberal arts university in Crete, Nebraska, US

Coordinates: 40.623578°N 96.948724°W

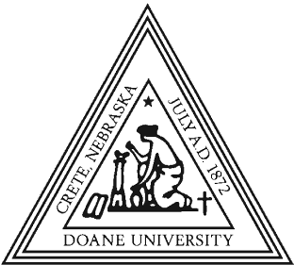
- Former name: Doane College (1872–2016)
- Type: Private university
- Established: 1872; 154 years ago
- Religious affiliation: United Church of Christ
- Endowment: $107.4 million (2025)
- President: Roger Hughes
- Students: 1,985
- Undergraduates: 1,315
- Location: Crete, Nebraska, U.S.
- Campus: Multiple sites
- Colors: Orange & Black
- Nickname: Tigers
- Sporting affiliations: NAIA – GPAC
- Website: doane.edu

Doane University is a private university in Crete, Nebraska, United States. It has additional campuses in Lincoln, Omaha, North Platte, and Bellevue. The oldest private institution in the State of Nebraska, the university was established in 1872 as Doane College following a donation from Thomas Doane. It is historically affiliated with the United Church of Christ.

== History ==
On May 20, 1871, a municipal secondary and post-secondary school was formed in Crete, Nebraska, known as Crete Academy. The following year, a new organization to oversee Crete Academy was established, and was located in Downtown Crete. Thomas Doane, the chief civil engineer for the Burlington and Missouri River Railroad, donated $2,000 to assist with funding the new school. The new organization was officially formed on July 11, 1872, as Doane College, named for Thomas Doane. Construction began the following year, and the college officially began its academic year in 1874. By 1912, the campus had expanded to six buildings.

In 1977, a part of Doane College's campus was listed on the National Register of Historic Places as the Doane College Historic District. In 1981, Doane College began operations in Lincoln, and later opened a full campus in 1988. In 2003, the college began offering classes in Grand Island through a partnership with Central Community College. In 2012, Doane College opened a campus in Omaha, which would include its School of Graduate and Professional Studies.

In May 2016, Doane College's leaders changed the institution's name to Doane University to reflect structural changes. In 2020, the director of the Perkins Library was placed on leave following a controversial, "Parties of the Past," exhibit, which included two photos of students wearing blackface in 1926. That same year, the Foundation for Individual Rights in Education named it one of the "Worst Colleges for Free Speech." The university later reinstated the library director.

== Campuses ==
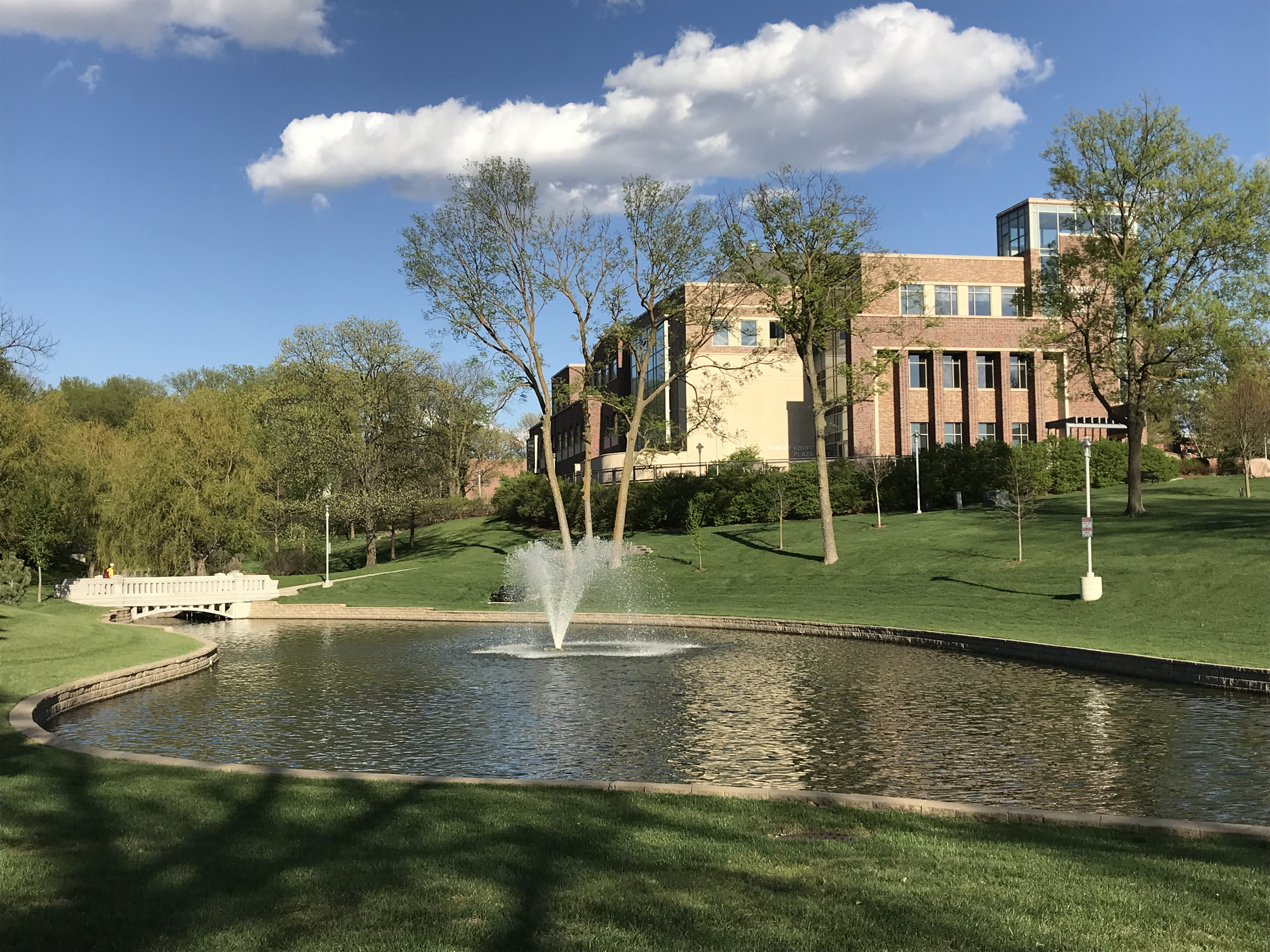
Miller Pond, Brandt Memorial Bridge, Chab Weyers Hixon Lied Art Building

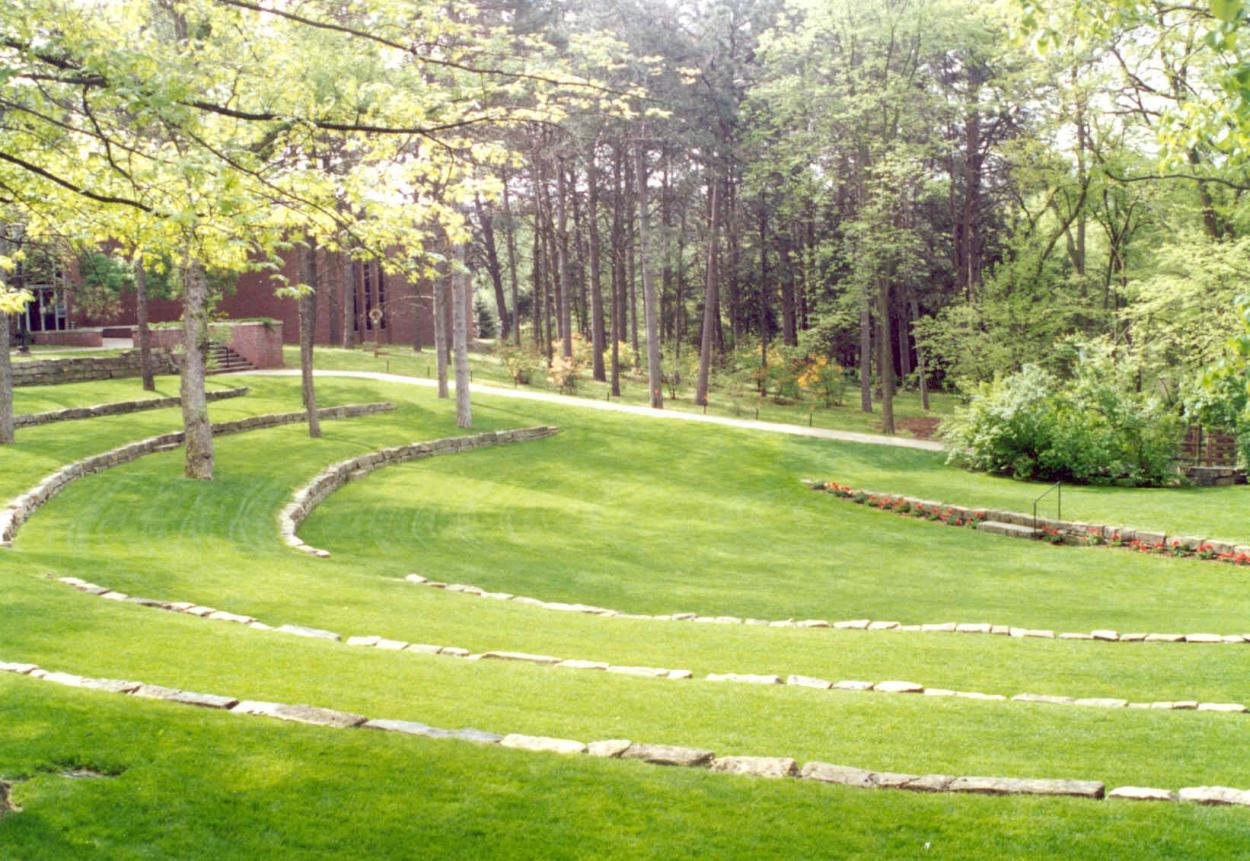
Cassel Open Air Theatre

Doane University's primary campus is located in Crete, Nebraska. Additionally, the university also has campuses and locations in Lincoln, Omaha, North Platte, and Bellevue. The main campus includes several academic and residential halls, as well as a stadium. The campus includes the Doane University Historic District, listed on the National Register of Historic Places.

== Academics ==
=== Colleges and schools ===
- The College of Arts and Sciences offers over 25 undergraduate majors.
- The College of Business offers undergraduate majors in accounting, agribusiness, business administration, and economics. Two graduate degrees are also offered: Master of Arts in Leadership and a Master of Business Administration.
- The College of Education offers undergraduate degrees in Elementary Education, Special Education, Secondary Education, and Physical and Health Education. Graduate programs include the Masters of Education, Master of Arts, Education Specialist, Doctorate of Education, and initial certification at the advanced Level (also known as the Fast Track Program.).
- The Open Learning Academy, offers online classes with transferable credits for non-degree seeking students. DoaneX, a partnership with MOOC platform edX, offers professional certificates and credentials.

=== Accreditations ===
Doane University is accredited by the Higher Learning Commission and approved by the Nebraska Coordinating Commission of Post-Secondary Education. Several programs also hold specialized accreditations.

- The teacher education unit at Doane University is accredited by the Council for the Accreditation of Educator Preparation (CAEP).
- The Master of Arts in Counseling program is accredited by the Council for Accreditation of Counseling and Related Educational Programs (CACREP).
- The Music Department is accredited by the National Association of Schools of Music.
- The Bachelor of Science in Engineering is accredited by the Engineering Accreditation Commission of ABET.

== Student media ==
Doane University is the home of the Doane Owl, the oldest student-run newspaper in the state of Nebraska. Established in 1879 as a literary publication and news bulletin, the Owl evolved into a traditional newspaper covering Doane, Saline County, and Crete, Nebraska.

Regarding student broadcasting, Doane's college radio station is KDNE. Programming on KDNE includes live broadcasts of Tigers sporting events, news broadcasts, and student-run music specialty shows. A pillar of the station is “Cheska Musica”, a long running polka show serving the nearby culturally Czech community of Wilber, Nebraska.

== Athletics ==
The Doane athletic teams are called the Tigers. The university is a member of the National Association of Intercollegiate Athletics (NAIA), primarily competing in the Great Plains Athletic Conference (GPAC) since the 1969–70 academic year.

Doane competes in 24 intercollegiate varsity sports. Men's sports include baseball, basketball, cross country, football, Greco-Roman wrestling, golf, soccer, tennis, track & field (indoor and outdoor) and wrestling; while women's sports include basketball, cross country, golf, soccer, softball, tennis, track & field (indoor and outdoor), volleyball and wrestling; and co-ed sports include cheerleading, dance and esports.

== Notable alumni ==
- Cristelle Rodriguez — Class of 2026 - senior world team women's wrestler
- Samantha Marie Ware – Class of 2013 - Actress and singer
- Raymonn Adams – Class of 2001 - Professional football player
- Bob Stitt – Class of 1987 - College football coach
- Barb Fugate — Class of 1980 - World Cup women's rugby player, coach and Hall of Fame member
- Michael Aung-Thwin – Class of 1969 - Burmese historian and academic
- John Perry – Class of 1964 - Philosopher
- Douglas L. Wilson – Class of 1957 - American presidential historian.
- Toshihiro Takami – Class of 1956 - Won the Asian version of the Nobel Peace Prize for his extensive work establishing ARI, teaching sustainable farming to third world countries.
- Weldon Kees – Class of 1935 - Poet, painter, filmmaker, and jazz musician
- Donald Nyrop — Class of 1934 - President, CEO, and chairman of the board of Northwest Airlines
- Robert Taylor – Class of 1933 - Hollywood actor
- Claude E. Welch – Class of 1927 - Chief surgeon of the Pope during the assassination attempt in 1981
- Ralph W. Tyler – Class of 1921 - American educator
- Robert Van Pelt – Class of 1920 - Judge, U.S. District Court, 1957–88
- Henry Pratt Fairchild – Class of 1900 - Sociologist and educator
- Judi M. gaiashkibos – Class of 2000 and Board of Trustees - Executive director of the Nebraska Commission on Indian Affairs
- Joseph D. Leitch – Class of 1886 - US Army major general
