= Crete, Nebraska =

City in Saline County, Nebraska, United States

- City
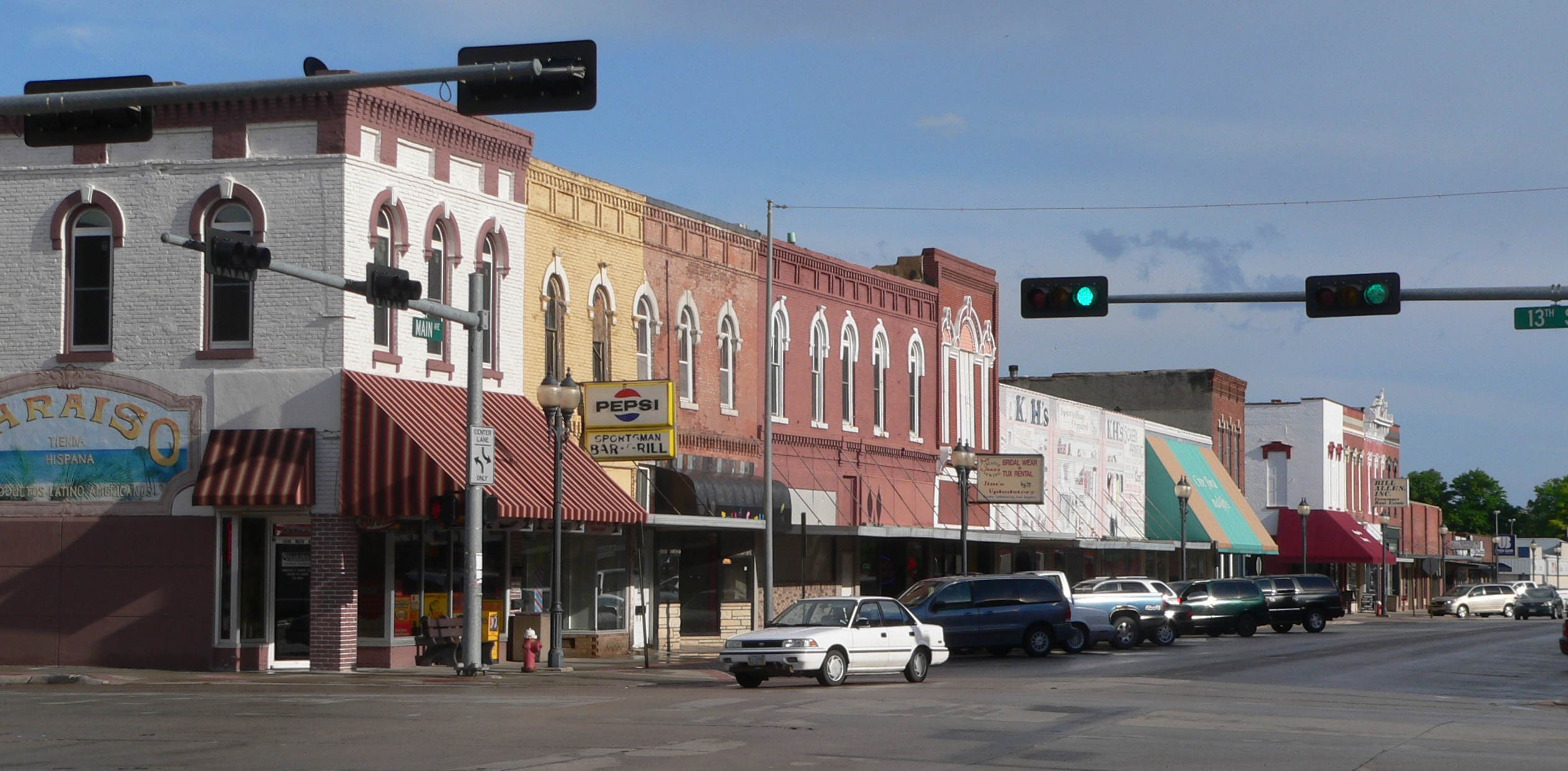
- Downtown Crete: Main Avenue, looking south from 13th Street, May 2013

- Location of Crete within Saline County and Nebraska
- Coordinates: 40°37′29″N 96°57′14″W
- Country: United States
- State: Nebraska
- County: Saline

Government
  - Mayor: David Bauer

Area
  - Total: 3.85 sq mi (9.97 km^{2})
  - Land: 3.80 sq mi (9.84 km^{2})
  - Water: 0.050 sq mi (0.13 km^{2})
- Elevation: 1,352 ft (412 m)

Population (2020)
  - Total: 7,099
  - Density: 1,869.2/sq mi (721.72/km^{2})
- Time zone: UTC-6 (Central (CST))
  - Summer (DST): UTC-5 (CDT)
- ZIP code: 68333
- Area code: 402
- FIPS code: 31-11370
- GNIS feature ID: 2393673
- Website: crete.ne.gov

Crete is the most populous city of Saline County, Nebraska, United States. The population was 7,099 at the 2020 census. The city is home to Doane University.

== History ==
The railroad reached Crete in 1870, attracting new settlers. In 1871, two competing settlements merged to form a new town, which was named after Crete, Illinois, the former hometown of an early settler. The name was also chosen to conform to the alphabetical stops on the new Chicago Burlington & Quincy Railroad line traveling westward from Lincoln: Berks, Crete, Dorchester, Exeter, Fairmont, Grafton, Harvard, Inland, Junianta, Kenesaw, Lowell, Minden etc. Some towns, such as Friend and Sutton, already existed and were later incorporated into alphabetical naming pattern. A town existed every 9 miles on the railroad, as a steam engine required regular water stops. Crete was once a contender for county seat.

On February 18, 1969, Crete was the site of a railroad accident that released a fog of anhydrous ammonia fumes from a ruptured railroad tank car, killing five residents and seriously injuring 11 others in their homes. Another three people, hoboes who had been riding on the Chicago, Burlington and Quincy Railroad freight train as it traveled from Denver to Chicago, died of injuries received in the train derailment.

== Geography ==
According to the United States Census Bureau, the city has a total area of 2.97 square miles (7.69 km^{2}), of which 2.92 square miles (7.56 km^{2}) is land and 0.05 square miles (0.13 km^{2}) is water.

=== Climate ===
Climate data for Crete 4ESE, Nebraska (1991–2020, extremes 1893–present)
Month	Jan	Feb	Mar	Apr	May	Jun	Jul	Aug	Sep	Oct	Nov	Dec	Year
Record high °F (°C)	73 (23)	84 (29)	90 (32)	96 (36)	104 (40)	108 (42)	114 (46)	114 (46)	106 (41)	98 (37)	86 (30)	73 (23)	114 (46)
Mean maximum °F (°C)	58.4 (14.7)	64.3 (17.9)	76.6 (24.8)	85.2 (29.6)	90.6 (32.6)	94.4 (34.7)	97.2 (36.2)	96.6 (35.9)	93.1 (33.9)	86.0 (30.0)	71.8 (22.1)	60.9 (16.1)	98.9 (37.2)
Mean daily maximum °F (°C)	34.4 (1.3)	39.6 (4.2)	51.7 (10.9)	63.0 (17.2)	72.9 (22.7)	82.5 (28.1)	86.5 (30.3)	84.6 (29.2)	78.4 (25.8)	66.0 (18.9)	50.9 (10.5)	37.9 (3.3)	62.4 (16.9)
Daily mean °F (°C)	24.0 (−4.4)	28.9 (−1.7)	39.7 (4.3)	51.1 (10.6)	61.6 (16.4)	71.6 (22.0)	75.7 (24.3)	73.7 (23.2)	66.2 (19.0)	53.6 (12.0)	39.6 (4.2)	27.8 (−2.3)	51.1 (10.6)
Mean daily minimum °F (°C)	13.6 (−10.2)	18.1 (−7.7)	27.8 (−2.3)	39.1 (3.9)	50.3 (10.2)	60.7 (15.9)	64.9 (18.3)	62.8 (17.1)	54.1 (12.3)	41.2 (5.1)	28.2 (−2.1)	17.8 (−7.9)	39.9 (4.4)
Mean minimum °F (°C)	−6.5 (−21.4)	−1.3 (−18.5)	8.2 (−13.2)	22.9 (−5.1)	36.2 (2.3)	49.1 (9.5)	55.1 (12.8)	53.2 (11.8)	38.7 (3.7)	23.9 (−4.5)	12.0 (−11.1)	−1.0 (−18.3)	−10.5 (−23.6)
Record low °F (°C)	−27 (−33)	−27 (−33)	−16 (−27)	6 (−14)	23 (−5)	37 (3)	41 (5)	41 (5)	23 (−5)	−4 (−20)	−7 (−22)	−25 (−32)	−27 (−33)
Average precipitation inches (mm)	0.69 (18)	0.81 (21)	1.45 (37)	2.58 (66)	5.65 (144)	4.86 (123)	3.84 (98)	3.35 (85)	3.11 (79)	2.32 (59)	1.22 (31)	1.14 (29)	31.02 (788)
Average snowfall inches (cm)	6.3 (16)	6.6 (17)	3.2 (8.1)	1.3 (3.3)	0.0 (0.0)	0.0 (0.0)	0.0 (0.0)	0.0 (0.0)	0.0 (0.0)	1.0 (2.5)	2.0 (5.1)	4.9 (12)	25.3 (64)
Average precipitation days (≥ 0.01 in)	4.7	4.7	6.4	8.7	12.1	10.3	9.9	9.8	8.2	7.4	4.9	5.3	92.4
Average snowy days (≥ 0.1 in)	3.5	3.4	1.5	0.4	0.0	0.0	0.0	0.0	0.0	0.3	1.1	2.6	12.8
Source: NOAA

== Demographics ==
Historical population
Census	Pop.	Note	%±
1880	1,870		—
1890	2,310		23.5%
1900	2,199		−4.8%
1910	2,404		9.3%
1920	2,445		1.7%
1930	2,865		17.2%
1940	3,038		6.0%
1950	3,692		21.5%
1960	3,546		−4.0%
1970	4,444		25.3%
1980	4,872		9.6%
1990	4,841		−0.6%
2000	6,028		24.5%
2010	6,960		15.5%
2020	7,099		2.0%
U.S. Decennial Census; 2012 Estimate

=== 2020 census ===
As of the 2020 census, Crete had a population of 7,099. The median age was 30.5 years. 29.8% of residents were under the age of 18 and 12.5% of residents were 65 years of age or older. For every 100 females there were 101.0 males, and for every 100 females age 18 and over there were 98.4 males age 18 and over. The population density was 1,868.2 per square mile (721.3/km^{2}).

97.9% of residents lived in urban areas, while 2.1% lived in rural areas.

There were 2,278 households in Crete and 1,590 families. Of all households, 42.6% had children under the age of 18 living in them, 47.6% were married-couple households, 20.4% were households with a male householder and no spouse or partner present, and 25.7% were households with a female householder and no spouse or partner present. About 25.1% of all households were made up of individuals and 10.8% had someone living alone who was 65 years of age or older. The average household size was 2.7 and the average family size was 3.3.

There were 2,455 housing units, of which 7.2% were vacant. The homeowner vacancy rate was 1.6% and the rental vacancy rate was 6.5%.

Racial composition as of the 2020 census
Race	Number	Percent
White	3,475	49.0%
Black or African American	90	1.3%
American Indian and Alaska Native	173	2.4%
Asian	233	3.3%
Native Hawaiian and Other Pacific Islander	45	0.6%
Some other race	2,011	28.3%
Two or more races	1,072	15.1%
Hispanic or Latino (of any race)	2,995	42.0%

=== Income and poverty ===
The 2016–2020 5-year American Community Survey estimates show that the median household income was $47,022 (with a margin of error of +/- $1,904) and the median family income $51,500 (+/- $9,621). Males had a median income of $30,729 (+/- $7,021) versus $17,788 (+/- $7,461) for females. The median income for those above 16 years old was $25,303 (+/- $6,532). Approximately, 17.2% of families and 20.6% of the population were below the poverty line, including 26.7% of those under the age of 18 and 11.7% of those ages 65 or over.

=== 2010 census ===
At the 2010 census there were 6,960 people, 2,199 households, and 1,447 families living in the city. The population density was 2,383.6 inhabitants per square mile (920.3/km^{2}). There were 2,389 housing units at an average density of 818.2 units per square mile (315.9 units/km^{2}). The racial makeup of the city was 70.6% White, 1.0% African American, 0.5% Native American, 2.5% Asian, 0.1% Pacific Islander, 23.1% from other races, and 2.2% from two or more races. Hispanic or Latino people of any race were 35.7%.

Of the 2,199 households 38.2% had children under the age of 18 living with them, 49.9% were married couples living together, 9.8% had a female householder with no husband present, 6.1% had a male householder with no wife present, and 34.2% were non-families. 27.2% of households were one person and 12.6% were one person aged 65 or older. The average household size was 2.79 and the average family size was 3.41.

The median age was 28.5 years. 25.7% of residents were under the age of 18; 19.8% were between the ages of 18 and 24; 23.6% were from 25 to 44; 20% were from 45 to 64; and 10.9% were 65 or older. The gender makeup of the city was 49.8% male and 50.2% female.

=== 2000 census ===
At the 2000 census, there were 6,028 people, 2,078 households, and 1,317 families living in the city. The population density was 2,541.9 inhabitants per square mile (981.4/km^{2}). There were 2,188 housing units at an average density of 922.7 units per square mile (356.3 units/km^{2}). The racial makeup of the city was 86.48% White, 0.76% African American, 0.73% Native American, 3.27% Asian, 0.03% Pacific Islander, 6.90% from other races, and 1.82% from two or more races. Hispanic or Latino people of any race were 13.50% of the population.

Of the 2,078 households 34.2% had children under the age of 18 living with them, 49.4% were married couples living together, 8.9% had a female householder with no husband present, and 36.6% were non-families. 29.2% of households were one person and 15.4% were one person aged 65 or older. The average household size was 2.54 and the average family size was 3.13.

The age distribution was 23.8% under the age of 18, 20.1% from 18 to 24, 24.3% from 25 to 44, 17.2% from 45 to 64, and 14.6% 65 or older. The median age was 30 years. For every 100 females, there were 96.7 males. For every 100 females age 18 and over, there were 93.8 males.

The median household income was $34,098, and the median family income was $43,295. Males had a median income of $30,778 versus $25,459 for females. The per capita income for the city was $14,936. About 7.8% of families and 12.7% of the population were below the poverty line, including 11.3% of those under age 18 and 11.0% of those age 65 or over.

== Government ==
Crete uses a city council with six council persons.

== Education ==
Tertiary education:

- Doane University
  - Doane College Historic Buildings
  - Doane College Osterhout Arboretum

Crete Public Schools is the local K-12 school district.

== Notable people ==
- Dana Altman, college basketball coach
- Miles Breuer, science fiction author
- John William Chapman, Lieutenant Governor of Illinois
- Morgan Maly, basketball player
- Teri Steer, Olympic shot putter
- Harold Montelle Stephens, United States federal judge

== See also ==
- List of municipalities in Nebraska
