= Tornado outbreak of June 16–18, 2014 =

Summer tornado outbreak in the U.S. Great Plains and Midwest

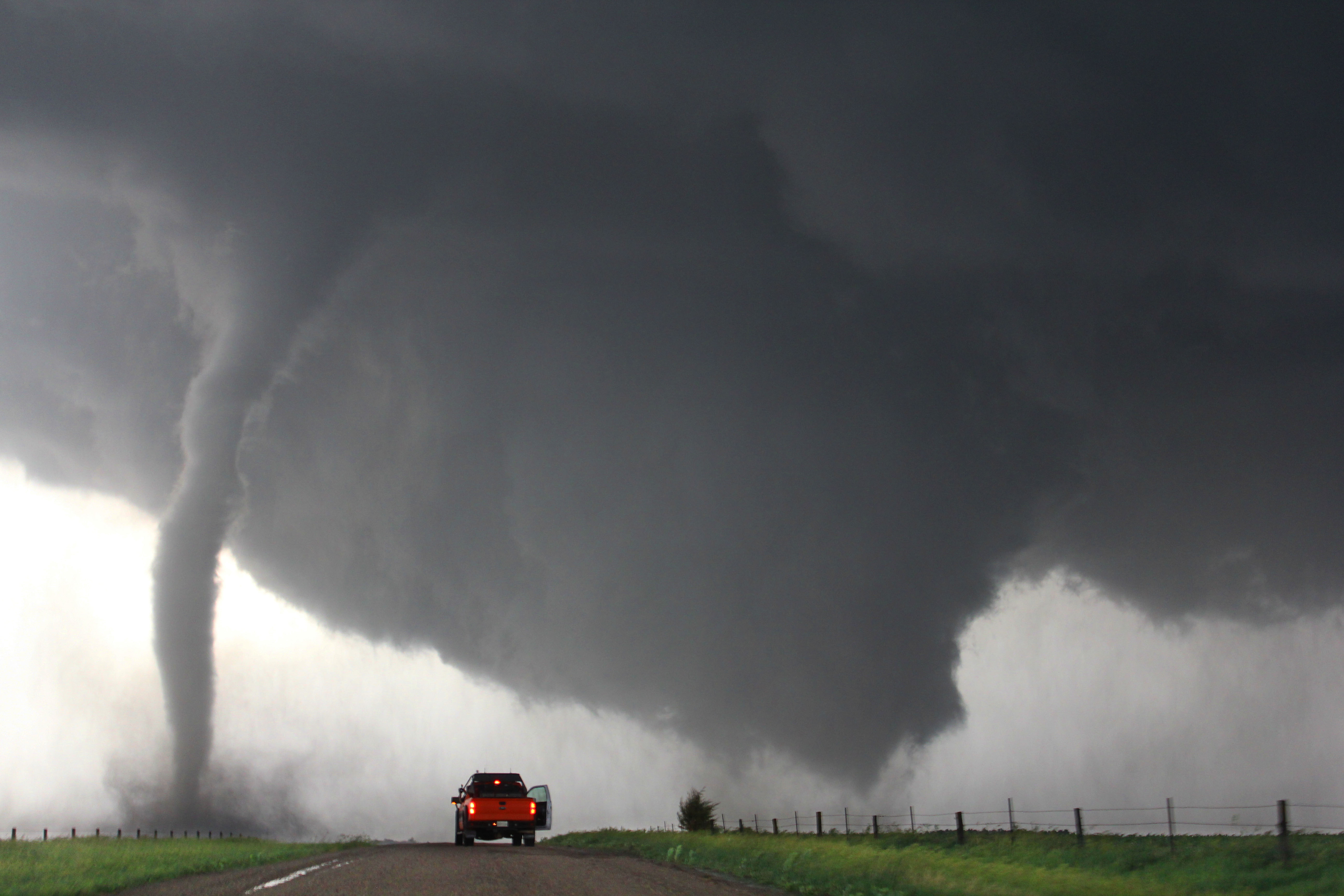
- Two EF4 tornadoes in Wayne County, Nebraska on June 16.

Meteorological history
- Duration: June 16–18, 2014

Tornado outbreak
- Tornadoes: 76 confirmed
- Max. rating: EF4 tornado
- Duration: 2 days, 6 hours, 47 minutes
- Highest winds: Tornadic – 191 mph (307 km/h) (Pilger, Nebraska EF4 on June 16)
- Highest gusts: Non-tornadic – 115 mph (185 km/h) (near Minnesota Lake, Minnesota on June 16)
- Largest hail: 4.25 inches (108 mm) across three locations in Nebraska on June 17

Overall effects
- Fatalities: 2 (+1 non-tornadic)
- Injuries: 28
- Damage: $127.584 million (2014 USD)
- Areas affected: Central United States, Ohio Valley, Eastern United States, Southern United States
- Part of the tornado outbreaks of 2014

The tornado outbreak of June 16–18, 2014, was a tornado outbreak concentrated in the Great Plains and the Midwestern United States. Two tornadoes also occurred in Ontario. The severe weather event most significantly affected the state of Nebraska, where twin EF4 tornadoes killed two and critically injured twenty others in and around the town of Pilger on the evening of June 16. The two Pilger tornadoes were part of a violent tornado family that produced four EF4 tornadoes and was broadcast live on television. The outbreak went on to produce multiple other strong tornadoes across the northern Great Plains states throughout the next two days.

== Meteorological synopsis ==
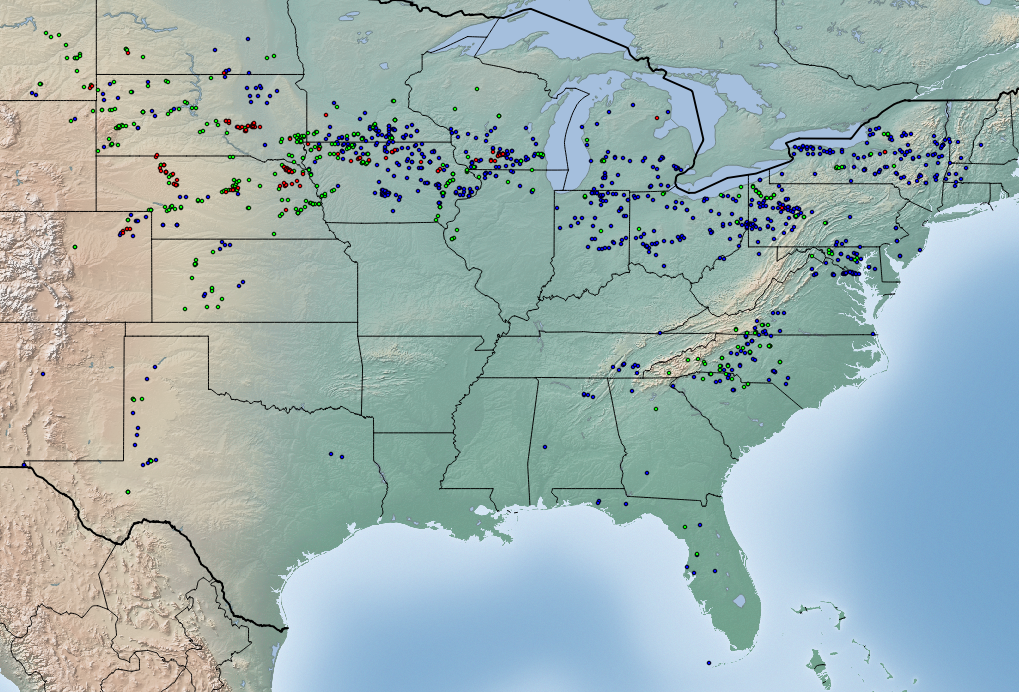
All preliminary storm reports received by the SPC from June 16–18

On June 13, 2014, the SPC noted the possibility of severe weather associated with potential mesoscale convective systems in the northern United States for June 16–18. However, the predictability of this event was too low for the SPC to designate areas as under risk of severe weather. The following day, the SPC revised their forecasts, indicating a slight risk for severe activity for areas around the confluence of the Big Sioux and Missouri rivers two days before the eventual tornado outbreak. The development of a low-pressure area and increasing atmospheric instability were expected to be contributing factors. Forecasts remained relatively unchanged on June 15, though the probability for "significant severe weather" was predicted for a large area of northern Iowa and adjacent areas.

The morning of June 16 was marked only by isolated storms in the Nebraska area with only marginal severe weather. Beginning at around 0800 UTC, however, favorable conditions for severe weather, particularly for large hail, began to build across central Nebraska. Moisture from the Gulf of Mexico began to make its way into southern Nebraska and over Kansas, raising dew points over the region. In addition, the prevalence of altocumulus castellanus clouds was an indicator for additional severe weather later in the day. The flow of moisture into the region was further enhanced by an eastward progressing warm front, and at 1200 UTC on June 16, the SPC once again issued a slight risk for severe weather for the eastern halves of South Dakota, Nebraska, and extending eastward into the western Great Lakes region. This was followed shortly after by the day's first severe thunderstorm watch, issued for primarily eastern Nebraska in response to a developing line of supercells. An hour later, the SPC upgraded some areas previously under a slight risk for severe weather to a moderate risk as a result of continuously increasing moisture content and CAPE in the atmosphere. At 1613 UTC, the SPC issued the first of three public severe weather outlooks for the day, covering a region centered on Sioux City, Iowa. A Particularly Dangerous Situation tornado watch was issued later that afternoon, and a powerful cyclic supercell developed in Nebraska. This supercell went on to produce a family of six tornadoes, including four EF4s that affected areas in and around Stanton, Pilger, and Wakefield, Nebraska. Two fatalities occurred in or near Pilger and much of the town was destroyed. Later that evening, two tornadoes (rated EF1 and EF2) struck the town of Platteville, Wisconsin simultaneously, resulting in major damage.

Before tornado activity continued on the 17th, a man died due to straight line winds in Iowa. An early morning EF3 causing major damage to homes and an elementary school in Verona, Wisconsin, and an EF2 from the same storm causing damage in residential areas of Madison. Later that day, an EF3 tornado caused significant damage in rural areas of Carter County, Montana near the Custer National Forest. A large EF2 tornado also caused damage to numerous homes in Angus and Barrie, Ontario. Later that evening, multiple large wedge tornadoes were reported near the towns of Coleridge and Laurel, Nebraska. One of these tornadoes caused EF3 damage to farms and trees outside of Coleridge.

On the night of June 18, an EF2 tornado hit the South Dakota town of Wessington Springs, trapping some of its residents in their homes. 43 homes and 12 businesses in town were damaged or destroyed. Another pair of twin tornadoes were also reported, near the South Dakota community of Crow Lake. A large multiple-vortex tornado completely destroyed a farm near the town of Alpena later that evening. That tornado was rated an EF4, the fifth of the outbreak sequence.

== Confirmed tornadoes ==
Confirmed tornadoes by Enhanced Fujita rating
EFU	EF0	EF1	EF2	EF3	EF4	EF5	Total
0	32	24	12	3	5	0	76

=== June 16 ===
List of confirmed tornadoes – Monday, June 16, 2014 (Note: All dates are based on the local time zone where the tornado touched down; however, all times are in Coordinated Universal Time for consistency.)
EF#	Location	County / Parish	State	Start Coord.	Time (UTC)	Path length	Max width	Damage (Note: All damage totals are in 2014 USD unless otherwise stated.)	Summary
EF0	ENE of Madison	Stanton	NE	41.8596°N 97.3602°W	2038 – 2040	1.25 mi (2.01 km)	100 yd (91 m)	$0	See article on this tornado family
EF4	SW of Stanton to N of Stanton	Stanton	NE	41.893°N 97.33°W	2042 – 2111	12.11 mi (19.49 km)	400 yd (370 m)	$2,250,000	See article on this tornado family
EF0	NNE of Alvord	Lyon	IA	43.37°N 96.31°W	2043 – 2044	0.2 mi (0.32 km)	50 yd (46 m)	$0	A brief tornado caused no reported damage.
EF4	E of Stanton to Pilger to E of Altona	Stanton, Cuming, Wayne	NE	41.9528°N 97.1369°W	2100 – 2146	23.94 mi (38.53 km)	500 yd (460 m)	$14,250,000	1 death – See article on this tornado family
EF4	SSE of Pilger to ENE of Altona	Stanton, Cuming, Wayne	NE	41.9742°N 97.04°W	2113 – 2139	11.5 mi (18.5 km)	500 yd (460 m)	$1,375,000	1 death – See article on this tornado family
EF4	E of Altona to NNE of Wakefield	Wayne, Dixon	NE	42.127°N 96.8686°W	2140 – 2208	15.84 mi (25.49 km)	530 yd (480 m)	$3,050,000	See article on this tornado family
EF0	SSW of Hubbard	Dakota	NE	42.36°N 96.59°W	2241 – 2242	0.26 mi (0.42 km)	50 yd (46 m)	$0	See article on this tornado family
EF0	N of Plover to WSW of West Bend	Pocahontas, Palo Alto	IA	42.8956°N 94.627°W	2244 – 2255	6.09 mi (9.80 km)	250 yd (230 m)	$10,000	Damage was limited to crops.
EF0	SW of Hardy	Humboldt	IA	42.7741°N 94.1259°W	2322 – 2330	4.61 mi (7.42 km)	50 yd (46 m)	$10,000	Little damage was observed.
EF0	N of Sargent	Custer	NE	41.6985°N 99.3655°W	2324	0.2 mi (0.32 km)	40 yd (37 m)	$0	A brief touchdown with no damage.
EF1	WSW of Burwell	Garfield	NE	41.7580°N 99.2362°W	2335 – 2340	2.4 mi (3.9 km)	400 yd (370 m)	$15,000	A small building was overturned, a grain bin was blown off its foundation and destroyed, and large tree limbs were downed.
EF1	NNE of Mason City Municipal Airport to NW of Mason City	Cerro Gordo	IA	43.2062°N 93.3101°W	2348 – 2353	3.03 mi (4.88 km)	110 yd (100 m)	$59,000	This tornado caused minor property damage, mainly near the end of its path.
EF1	SW of Meservey to N of Alexander	Wright, Franklin	IA	42.875°N 93.5054°W	2352 – 2356	2.57 mi (4.14 km)	175 yd (160 m)	$30,000	A tornado embedded within a larger swath of straight-line winds damaged trees and farmsteads.
EF0	N of Mason City	Cerro Gordo	IA	43.2216°N 93.2126°W	2356 – 2357	1.1 mi (1.8 km)	40 yd (37 m)	$7,000	An intermittent tornado damaged some trees and a house north of Mason City. A convergent pattern was noted in nearby farm fields.
EF2	NNW of Burwell to NE of Burwell	Garfield	NE	41.8028°N 99.1407°W	0001 – 0015	5.19 mi (8.35 km)	500 yd (460 m)	$100,000	A center irrigation pivot system was overturned, and numerous trees and power poles were snapped.
EF2	ENE of Burwell (1st tornado)	Garfield	NE	41.8397°N 98.9986°W	0020 – 0026	1.56 mi (2.51 km)	700 yd (640 m)	$100,000	Numerous trees were snapped and uprooted, a street sign was bent, and buildings were damaged.
EF2	ENE of Burwell (2nd tornado)	Garfield	NE	41.8348°N 98.9567°W	0028 – 0032	0.3 mi (0.48 km)	400 yd (370 m)	$5,000	Numerous trees were snapped, with a few denuded.
EF0	ENE of Burwell (3rd tornado)	Garfield	NE	41.8295°N 98.9537°W	0030	0.2 mi (0.32 km)	40 yd (37 m)	$1,000	A brief tornado downed several large tree limbs.
EF1	N of Allison to W of Clarksville	Butler	IA	42.7918°N 92.823°W	0039 – 0046	4.71 mi (7.58 km)	100 yd (91 m)	$205,000	Several farmsteads were damaged, with a barn completely destroyed at one of them. Trees in a shelter belt were also heavily damaged.
EF1	ENE of Allison to W of Clarksville	Butler	IA	42.7831°N 92.7498°W	0045 – 0048	1.72 mi (2.77 km)	150 yd (140 m)	$401,000	This tornado formed just south of the previous tornado and damaged a farmstead, destroying outbuildings at that location. Trees in multiple shelter belts were heavily damaged.
EF1	E of Clarksville to N of Shell Rock	Butler	IA	42.7849°N 92.6323°W	0052 – 0055	2.12 mi (3.41 km)	120 yd (110 m)	$202,000	Multiple shelter belts were damaged, along with two homes, one of which lost part of its roof.
EF0	WNW of Tripoli	Bremer	IA	42.8134°N 92.3349°W	0112 – 0116	2 mi (3.2 km)	75 yd (69 m)	$4,000	A brief tornado remained over open fields.
EF0	SW of Dickinson	Stark	ND	46.71°N 102.9°W	0223 – 0227	1.35 mi (2.17 km)	25 yd (23 m)	$0	This tornado remained over open country and caused no damage.
EF1	SSW of Lamont to Southern Edgewood	Buchanan, Delaware	IA	42.5412°N 91.6484°W	0230 – 0255	13.9 mi (22.4 km)	50 yd (46 m)	$150,000	Several grain bins were collapsed or destroyed and two old hog confinements were severely damaged. Numerous trees were snapped as well.
EF0	SSW of Atkins	Benton	IA	41.9792°N 91.8728°W	0305 – 0306	0.07 mi (0.11 km)	30 yd (27 m)	$1,000	A brief tornado left a swath of damage in a corn field. Corn stalks were snapped off at their base.
EF2	Southern Platteville	Grant	WI	42.7376°N 90.5188°W	0345 – 0350	3.76 mi (6.05 km)	100 yd (91 m)	$11,502,000	This was the first of two tornadoes that struck Platteville simultaneously. This one damaged 20 homes and destroyed 12 others, including a split-level home that had its top floor ripped off. Multiple businesses were also damaged, including a gas station that was destroyed. Several buildings had major roof damage and windows blown out at the University of Wisconsin-Platteville Campus, and multiple cars on the property were flipped and damaged. Metal light poles at the stadium were broken. Trees and power lines were downed, and a cemetery was damaged as well. Five people were injured, one seriously.
EF1	Northern Platteville	Grant	WI	42.7521°N 90.4731°W	0349 – 0350	0.49 mi (0.79 km)	50 yd (46 m)	$541,000	This was the second of two tornadoes that struck Platteville simultaneously. The roof was ripped off of an apartment building and some trees were downed.
EF1	N of Leslie to SE of Rewey	Lafayette, Iowa	WI	42.8119°N 90.3672°W	0400 – 0402	1.17 mi (1.88 km)	50 yd (46 m)	$33,000	Many trees were downed or snapped.
EF1	NE of Leslie	Lafayette	WI	42.8054°N 90.3731°W	0400 – 0411	4.35 mi (7.00 km)	200 yd (180 m)	$1,500,000	Numerous trees and power poles were downed, and a large calf barn was nearly completely destroyed, killing two calves. Several pole barns were completely destroyed, and homes sustained minor roof damage. A garage was blown off of its foundation.
EF1	WSW of Mineral Point	Iowa	WI	42.8208°N 90.2636°W	0410 – 0411	0.41 mi (0.66 km)	100 yd (91 m)	$20,000	Numerous large trees were downed and cars were flipped. A chimney was removed from a home, and a small shed sustained roof damage.
EF1	NW of Postville (1st tornado)	Green	WI	42.8157°N 89.7947°W	0436 – 0438	0.4 mi (0.64 km)	125 yd (114 m)	$50,000	Farm buildings sustained major damage, and numerous large trees were downed.
EF1	NW of Postville (2nd tornado)	Green	WI	42.825°N 89.7828°W	0436 – 0438	0.51 mi (0.82 km)	125 yd (114 m)	$200,000	Two homes sustained major damage, and 24 homes sustained minor damage. Numerous large trees were downed as well.

=== June 17 ===
List of confirmed tornadoes – Tuesday, June 17, 2014
EF#	Location	County / Parish	State / Province	Start Coord.	Time (UTC)	Path length	Max width	Damage	Summary
EF3	Verona	Dane	WI	43.0024°N 89.5579°W	0508 – 0510	0.96 mi (1.54 km)	100 yd (91 m)	$14,000,000	Country View Elementary School and several homes sustained major structural damage, with other homes sustaining lesser damage. Reinforced, load-bearing masonry exterior walls were collapsed at the school. A large storage barn was swept away, with six antique cars stored inside thrown into an adjacent field and destroyed.
EF2	Southwestern Madison	Dane	WI	43.07°N 89.40°W	0515 – 0516	0.22 mi (0.35 km)	200 yd (180 m)	$5,000,000	A brief, but strong tornado touched down in a residential area of southwest Madison, downing numerous trees and power lines and damaging structures. Homes had their roofs torn off on Friar Lane.
EF1	SSW of Maple Bluff	Dane	WI	43.0772°N 89.3696°W	0521 – 0522	1.49 mi (2.40 km)	300 yd (270 m)	$150,000	A tornado began at B.B. Clarke Beach just to the east of downtown Madison and affected the Marquette neighborhood. Numerous trees were snapped and uprooted, some of which landed on homes and cars. Power lines were downed, and a house and a business lost their roofs. Other homes sustained shingle damage and several sailboats were sunk. A canoe and two kayaks were thrown as well.
EF1	ENE of Clarno to SE of Juda	Green	WI	42.5323°N 89.6119°W	0940 – 0948	6.78 mi (10.91 km)	640 yd (590 m)	$300,000	Sheds were destroyed and barns were severely damaged. Numerous large trees were snapped and uprooted.
EF1	Hale	Iosco	MI	44.3722°N 83.8247°W	1557 – 1558	1.58 mi (2.54 km)	100 yd (91 m)	$140,000	High-profile vehicles and numerous power and light poles were blown over in town, considerable tree damage was observed, and several homes and businesses sustained roof damage.
EF3	W of Capitol to Custer National Forest	Carter	MT	45.4783°N 104.1832°W	2027 – 2130	10 mi (16 km)	880 yd (800 m)	Unknown	A trailer home was obliterated, with its frame twisted and tossed over one mile (1.6 km) away. Nearby, an old A-frame schoolhouse was completely destroyed with only its basement left behind. Debris from this structure was thrown 100 yards (91 m). Six nearby cars were found up to 200 yards (180 m) away. Twenty power poles were snapped along the track, one of which was pulled out of the ground. Additionally, 20 hay bales weighing up to 1,500 lb (680 kg) were blown away and not recovered. The tornado continued into Custer National Forest before dissipating. This was the strongest tornado ever recorded in southeastern Montana.
EF2	Angus to Southern Barrie	Simcoe	ON	Unknown	~2120 – 2135	~20 km (12 mi)	Unknown	Unknown	This tornado touched down in Angus, where many homes had their roofs torn off and one lost its second story. A van was flipped as well. Further east, a mobile home park was damaged near Essa. The tornado entered the south side of Barrie and snapped numerous trees and power poles, a few of which landed on homes. Steel shipping containers weighing up to 9,800 lbs were blown more than 20 feet from where they originated before the tornado dissipated. More than 100 residences were damaged along the path, including 30 to 40 with significant damage. Hundreds of trees were downed as well.
EF1	Stroud	Simcoe	ON	Unknown	~2130	0.75 km (0.47 mi)	300 m (330 yd)	Unknown	A tornado lifted a 12-by-15-metre (39 by 49 ft) shed and tossed it 70 metres (230 ft) into a farm home. Numerous trees were also snapped or uprooted.
EF0	NE of Hell Creek State Park	Carter	MT	47.715°N 106.7041°W	2154 – 2158	0.07 mi (0.11 km)	15 yd (14 m)	$0	A cooperative observer reported a tornado that caused no known damage.
EF0	SSE of Irwin	Cherry	NE	42.5845°N 101.7613°W	2240 – 2243	0.37 mi (0.60 km)	40 yd (37 m)	$0	The public reported a tornado that moved across open country; no known damage occurred.
EF0	NNE of Irwin	Cherry	NE	42.986°N 101.876°W	2240	0.2 mi (0.32 km)	40 yd (37 m)	$0	A trained storm spotter observed a brief tornado; no damage was reported.
EF0	S of Merriman	Cherry	NE	42.5122°N 101.7089°W	2328 – 2332	0.73 mi (1.17 km)	40 yd (37 m)	$60,000	A semi-trailer truck was overturned and a car was blown off the road.
EF0	N of Whitman	Cherry	NE	42.4255°N 101.5528°W	0000 – 0010	0.66 mi (1.06 km)	40 yd (37 m)	$10,000	Trees were uprooted and treetops were damaged.
EF1	SW of Hartington	Cedar	NE	42.5606°N 97.3137°W	0057 – 0105	3.94 mi (6.34 km)	630 yd (580 m)	$10,000	A tornado heavily damaged outbuildings on a farmstead. Tree damage occurred along the path as well.
EF3	NW of Coleridge to NE of Coleridge	Cedar	NE	42.5371°N 97.2563°W	0109 – 0156	8.24 mi (13.26 km)	2,059 yd (1,883 m)	$2,000,000	See section on this tornado.
EF0	WSW of Brownlee	Cherry	NE	42.12°N 101.15°W	0139	0.2 mi (0.32 km)	20 yd (18 m)	$0	An NWS employee observed a brief tornado in open rangeland; no known damage occurred.
EF1	Verona to Westmoreland	Oneida	NY	41.13°N 75.58°W	0203	11 mi (18 km)	250 yd (230 m)	Unknown	Numerous trees were snapped and uprooted in Verona, several homes sustained trim and shingle damage, tree branches were speared into a garage wall, fences and signs were downed, and a barn and sheds were destroyed in town. Minor tree damage occurred further east before the tornado lifted in Westmoreland.
EF0	WSW of Mullen	Hooker	NE	41.9607°N 101.2685°W	0207 – 0217	1.7 mi (2.7 km)	40 yd (37 m)	$0	A trained storm spotter observed a tornado that caused no known damage.
EF1	NNE of Laurel	Cedar	NE	42.5078°N 97.0519°W	0210 – 0225	3.39 mi (5.46 km)	850 yd (780 m)	$25,000	A house on a farmstead lost part of its roof and nearby outbuildings were heavily damaged. Tree and power pole damage occurred as well.
EF0	ENE of Coleridge	Cedar	NE	42.516°N 97.1589°W	0210 – 0218	1.29 mi (2.08 km)	100 yd (91 m)	$0	A short-lived tornado caused minor damage.
EF2	NNE of Laurel	Cedar	NE	42.516°N 97.1589°W	0228 – 0234	0.94 mi (1.51 km)	200 yd (180 m)	$50,000	A short-lived but strong tornado struck impacted two farmsteads; on one, a majority of the roof was removed from a house and several outbuildings were completely destroyed.
EF2	NNE of Laurel	Cedar	NE	42.4988°N 97.0407°W	0245 – 0325	8.04 mi (12.94 km)	750 yd (690 m)	$250,000	Outbuildings were completely destroyed at a farmstead, and extensive tree and power line damage occurred.
EF1	WNW of Dixon	Dixon	NE	42.426°N 97.0177°W	0345 – 0352	2.5 mi (4.0 km)	100 yd (91 m)	$20,000	A tornado damaged farm buildings, trees, power poles, and crops along its path.
EF2	S of Humboldt	Minnehaha	SD	43.5975°N 97.0583°W	0344 – 0402	3.37 mi (5.42 km)	400 yd (370 m)	$100,000	Trees and power poles were snapped, outbuildings were destroyed, and a house lost its roof and some exterior walls. A metal storage building was destroyed as well.
EF0	S of George	Lyon	IA	43.27°N 96.0°W	0427 – 0428	0.3 mi (0.48 km)	50 yd (46 m)	$0	A trained storm spotter observed a brief tornado over open country; no known damage occurred.

=== June 18 ===
List of confirmed tornadoes – Wednesday, June 18, 2014
EF#	Location	County / Parish	State	Start Coord.	Time (UTC)	Path length	Max width	Damage	Summary
EF0	NW of Royal	Clay	IA	43.09°N 95.33°W	0615 – 0616	0.2 mi (0.32 km)	50 ft (17 yd)	$5,000	A brief tornado damaged a few outbuildings.
EF0	NE of Black Earth	Dane	WI	43.1564°N 89.7122°W	1227 – 1228	0.16 mi (0.26 km)	30 yd (27 m)	$0	The public observed a tornado damaging trees.
EF1	E of Stephan	Hyde	SD	44.2509°N 99.3672°W	2305 – 2315	0.73 mi (1.17 km)	40 yd (37 m)	Unknown	One house had part of its metal roof torn off while another completely lost its roof structure. A wooden barn collapsed, a machine shed was destroyed, and a semi-tractor trailer was blown on its side. Numerous trees in a grove were topped or had large branches broken off.
EF0	NE of Fort Thompson	Buffalo	SD	44.18°N 99.28°W	2307 – 2315	2 mi (3.2 km)	440 yd (400 m)	Unknown	Several softwood trees in a windbreak were uprooted or had large branches broken off.
EF0	E of Gann Valley	Buffalo	SD	44.023°N 98.939°W	2345 – 2350	0.65 mi (1.05 km)	250 yd (230 m)	$0	A trained storm spotter reported a tornado in open country; no known damage occurred.
EF1	NW of Crow Lake	Jerauld	SD	44.0487°N 98.8351°W	2358 – 0004	0.67 mi (1.08 km)	50 yd (46 m)	$15,000	A farm building sustained severe roof damage and tree damage occurred as well.
EF0	SW of Ree Heights	Hand	SD	44.433°N 99.268°W	0000 – 0005	0.21 mi (0.34 km)	75 yd (69 m)	Unknown	A tornado caused roof damage to an outbuilding and damaged several trees in a windbreak.
EF0	SW of Cresbard	Faulk	SD	45.122°N 98.995°W	0000 – 0005	1.17 mi (1.88 km)	75 yd (69 m)	Unknown	Aerial survey revealed a visible tornado path through a farm field.
EF1	Crow Lake	Jerauld	SD	43.948°N 98.7844°W	0001 – 0018	6.83 mi (10.99 km)	150 yd (140 m)	$50,000	A tornado collapsed the roof of a farm building, causing severe damage, and snapped several trees. Crop damage occurred as well.
EF0	SW of Ashley	McIntosh	ND	45.99°N 99.43°W	0008 – 0009	0.02 mi (0.032 km)	20 yd (18 m)	$0	Law enforcement reported a brief tornado in open country; no known damaged occurred.
EF2	NNW of Crow Lake	Jerauld	SD	44.0635°N 98.8025°W	0008 0017	0.77 mi (1.24 km)	100 yd (91 m)	$20,000	A farm building was destroyed, and trees were splintered or debarked.
EF2	Wessington Springs	Jerauld	SD	44.0725°N 98.573°W	0030 – 0052	2.22 mi (3.57 km)	200 yd (180 m)	$5,200,000	See section on this tornado – 1 person was injured.
EF4	SSE of Lane to W of Alpena to S of Virgil	Jerauld, Beadle	SD	44.0372°N 98.4032°W	0043 – 0125	11.5 mi (18.5 km)	880 yd (800 m)	$300,000	See section on this tornado – 2 people were injured.
EF2	NW of Crow Lake	Jerauld	SD	44.034°N 98.8908°W	0045 – 0054	1.09 mi (1.75 km)	100 yd (91 m)	$25,000	A farm building was destroyed and damage to crops and trees was observed.
EF0	SE of Limestone	Clarion	PA	41.1059°N 79.2986°W	0049 – 0056	4.57 mi (7.35 km)	150 yd (140 m)	$25,000	Numerous hardwood trees were snapped or uprooted, a barn was destroyed, and the roof of a second-story deck was removed.
EF0	NE of Akron	Washington	CO	40.38°N 102.95°W	0216	0.1 mi (0.16 km)	50 yd (46 m)	$0	A trained storm spotter observed a brief tornado; no damage was reported.
EF0	NNE of Akron	Washington	CO	40.3°N 103.07°W	0226	0.1 mi (0.16 km)	50 yd (46 m)	$0	A brief tornado remained over open country and caused no damage.
EF0	SE of Akron	Washington	CO	40.23°N 103.07°W	0236	0.1 mi (0.16 km)	50 yd (46 m)	$0	A trained storm spotter observed a brief tornado; no damage was reported.
EF0	NE of Marshall	Lyon	MN	44.48°N 95.75°W	0324 – 0325	0.25 mi (0.40 km)	50 yd (46 m)	$0	A brief tornado caused no known damage.

=== Northeast Nebraska tornado family ===
Northeast Nebraska tornado family
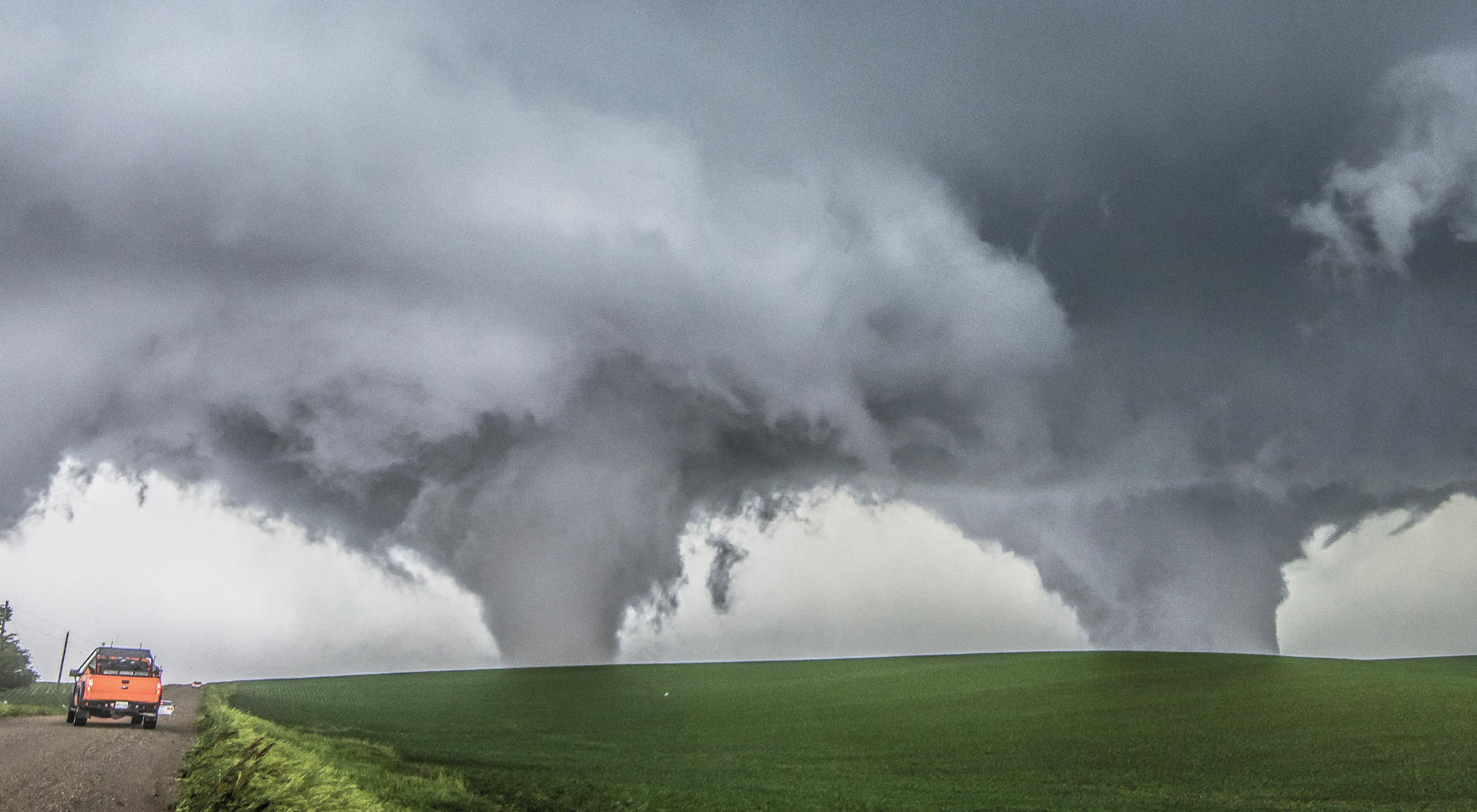
- Two EF4 tornadoes on the ground simultaneously north of Pilger.

Meteorological history
- Formed: June 16, 2014, 2:38 p.m. CDT (UTC−05:00)
- Dissipated: June 16, 2014, 4:42 p.m. CDT (UTC−05:00)
- Duration: 2 hours, 3 minutes

EF4 tornado
- on the Enhanced Fujita scale
- Highest winds: 191 mph (307 km/h)

Overall effects
- Fatalities: 2
- Injuries: 20
- Damage: $20.32 million (2014 USD)

Confirmed tornadoes by Enhanced Fujita rating
EFU	EF0	EF1	EF2	EF3	EF4	EF5	Total
0	2	0	0	0	4	0	6

This violent and extremely rare tornado family was spawned by a powerful, cyclic supercell thunderstorm that affected five counties in northeastern Nebraska. Six tornadoes touched down as a result of this supercell, four of which were rated EF4.

The first tornado, which was rated EF0, touched down briefly in an open field near Stanton, causing no damage. After this tornado dissipated, another tornado touched down southwest of Stanton, initially snapping trees and power poles at EF0 to EF1 intensity as it moved northeast. As the tornado passed west of Stanton and grew into a large wedge, barns were destroyed and swept away at EF2 intensity and power poles were snapped. Two homes were leveled at high-end EF3 intensity in this area as well. Farther north of town, the tornado weakened slightly to EF2 strength as a house had its roof torn off, a semi-truck was flipped, and several outbuildings were destroyed. The tornado then re-intensified dramatically near the Maskenthine Reservoir, reaching EF4 strength. Two farmhouses were swept away, and multiple trees were debarked in this area. A car and a pickup truck were lofted and thrown over a quarter mile, both of which were mangled beyond recognition. The tornado maintained EF4 strength as it crossed N-57, sweeping away a house and a barn, and debarking additional trees. Another barn was destroyed at EF2 strength before the tornado roped out and dissipated.

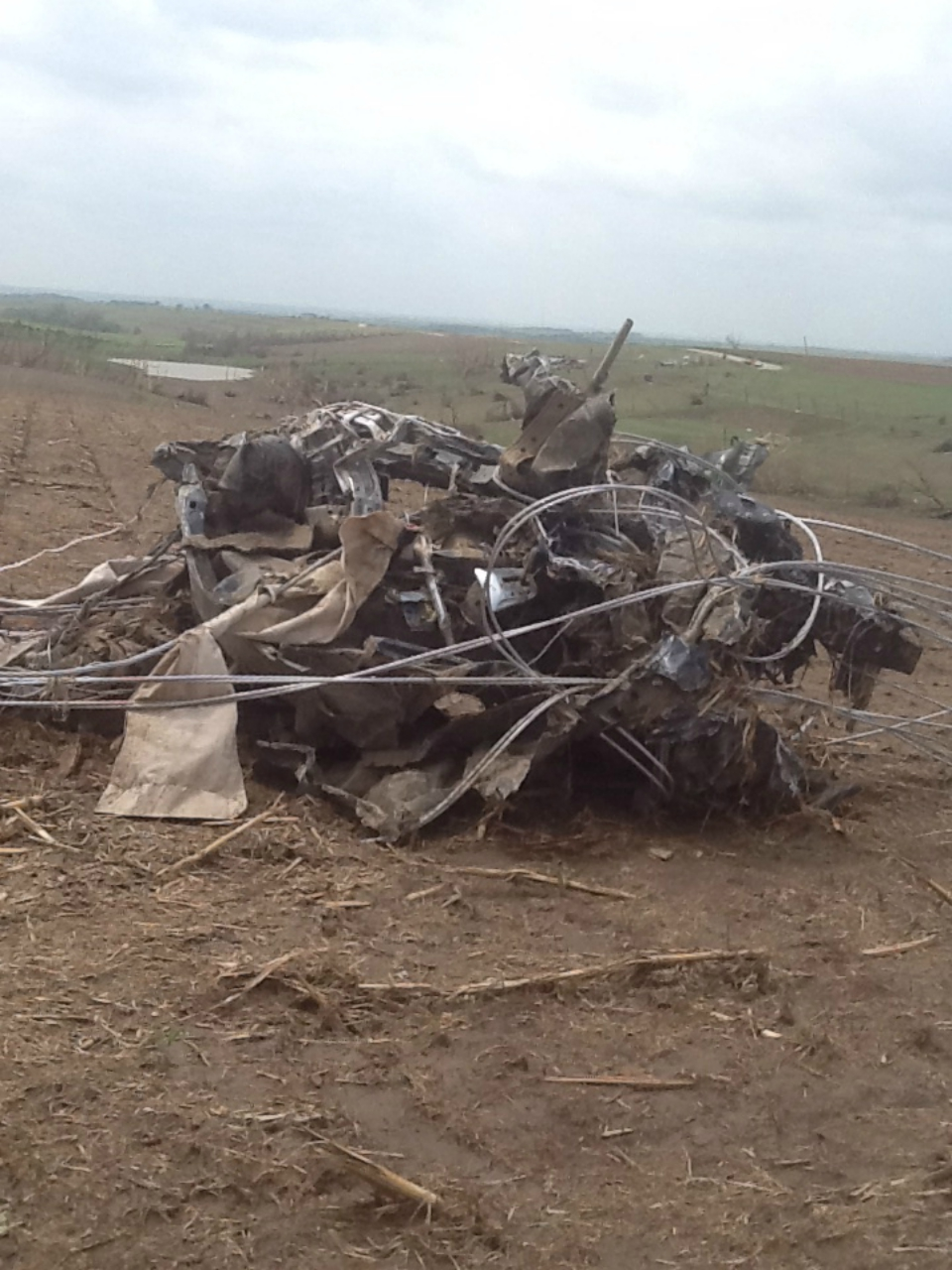
Remains of a car that was thrown over a quarter-mile and rendered unrecognizable by the EF4 Stanton tornado.

After the Stanton tornado lifted, a new tornado touched down southwest of Pilger. The tornado was initially weak, damaging trees, power poles, and outbuildings. The tornado intensified as it approached town, and barns and outbuildings were leveled or swept away at EF2 intensity. The tornado then became violent, striking Pilger directly at EF4 strength, killing one person, injuring many others, and damaging or destroying most structures in town. This led to Nebraska's first tornado fatality since 2004. As the main Pilger tornado was approaching town, a second nearly identical tornado developed south of town and paralleled the path of the main tornado, causing minor tree and outbuilding damage. Numerous homes and businesses in Pilger were completely destroyed, with several leveled or swept away. Numerous brick buildings in the downtown area were heavily damaged or destroyed, and trees throughout the town were denuded and debarked. A granary was destroyed, multiple cars were thrown and mangled, and a school building had much of its top floor destroyed. A church was completely leveled and partially swept away as the tornado exited the town.

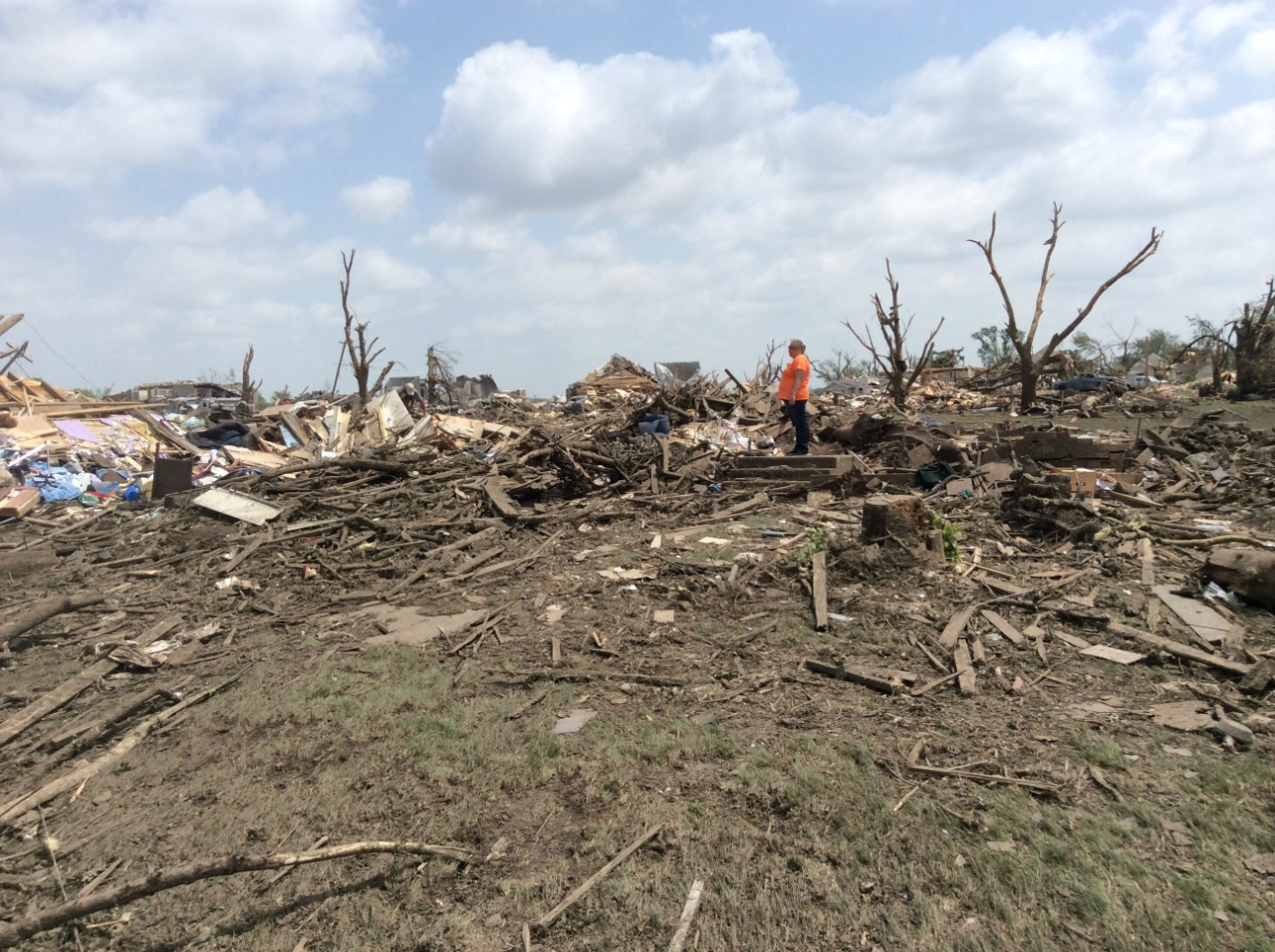
EF4 damage in a residential area of Pilger.

Past Pilger, the twin tornadoes continued northeast, with the main tornado debarking several trees at EF3 strength and tearing the roofs off of two homes, while the other tornado damaged several farms at EF2 strength and snapped multiple trees. Both tornadoes grew in size as the damage paths shifted closer to each other. The main Pilger tornado destroyed outbuildings and snapped trees and power poles at EF2 strength, while the other tornado reached EF3 strength, snapping a metal transmission pole, destroying several barns, and inflicting EF1 damage to a house at the edge of the path. Both tornadoes then reached EF4 strength simultaneously as the paths crossed. Numerous trees were completely debarked in this area, and two farm homes were swept away with only the basements remaining. One of these two homes was hit by both tornadoes. Vehicles were lofted in this area, over 300 cattle in nearby herds were killed, and a fatality occurred as the second tornado tossed a car from a road. After the tornadoes crossed paths, the second tornado veered to the north and destroyed an outbuilding and tore the roof and some walls from a house at EF2 strength before lifting. The main Pilger tornado continued to the northeast, snapping trees and sweeping away another home at EF4 strength. The main tornado then veered and moved almost due east, destroying two outbuildings as it roped out and dissipated.

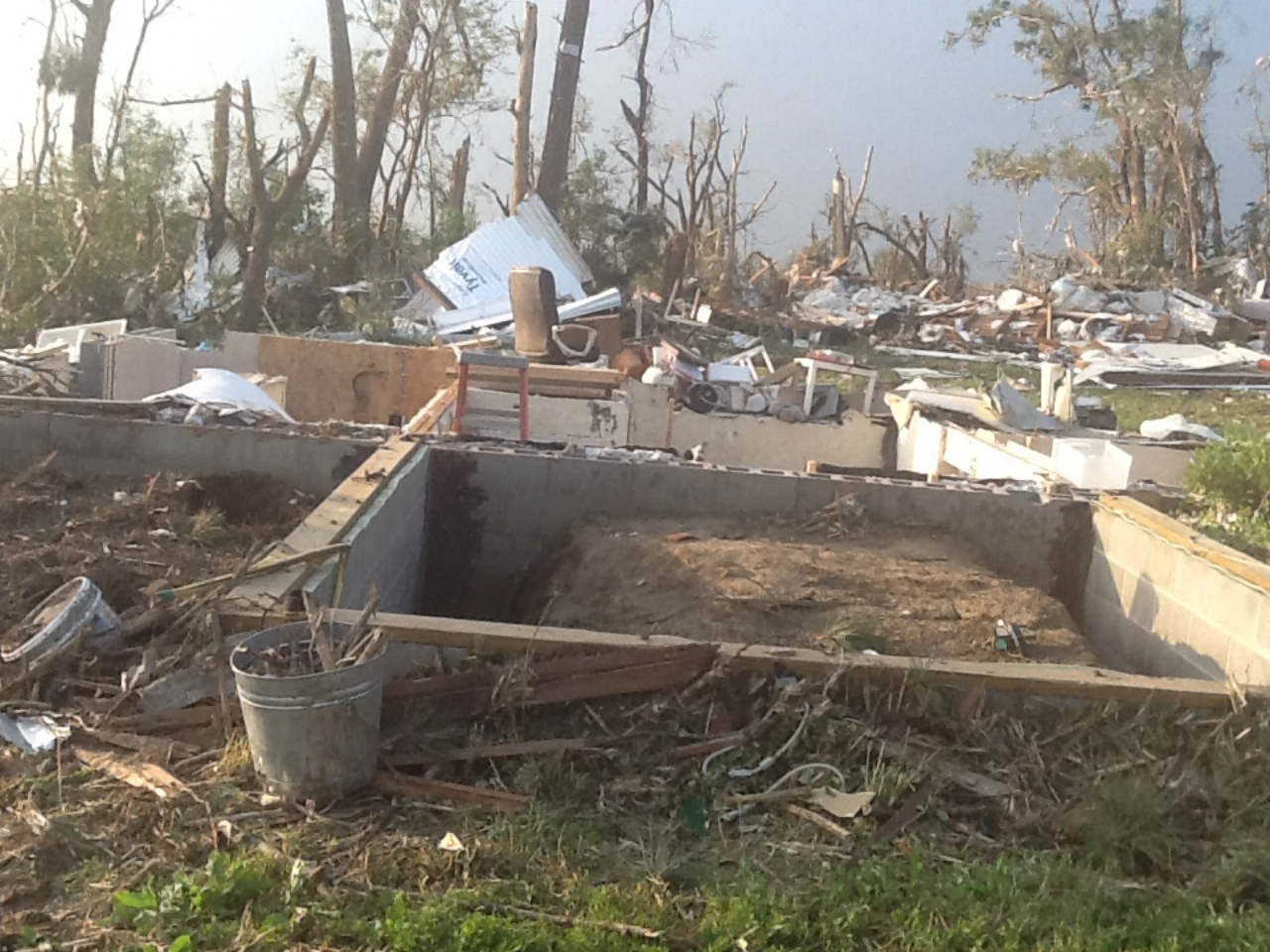
House that was swept completely away by the EF4 Wakefield tornado.

The fifth tornado spawned by this supercell touched down as the main Pilger tornado was dissipating. This large wedge tornado quickly reached EF4 strength soon after touching down, moving east as it cleanly swept away a farm home. Further east, a large metal electrical transmission truss tower was toppled at EF3 intensity. The main Pilger tornado was seen roping out and rotating around the perimeter of this new tornado as it developed. The tornado then weakened somewhat as it veered sharply to the north, destroying outbuildings and toppling power poles at EF2 intensity. Continuing due-north, the tornado maintained EF2 strength as it tore roofs off of multiple homes and destroyed numerous barns and outbuildings. The tornado then re-strengthened to EF4 intensity as it crossed 854th Rd, sweeping away several farm homes at that location and debarking multiple trees. The tornado then weakened back to EF2 strength and became rain-wrapped as it passed east of Wakefield, destroying outbuildings, snapping trees and power poles, and tearing roofs off of homes at EF1 to EF2 strength before dissipating north of town. After the Wakefield tornado dissipated, the supercell continued to the northeast, producing a sixth and final EF0 tornado that briefly touched down in an open field near the town of Hubbard, causing no damage.

=== Coleridge, Nebraska ===
Coleridge, Nebraska
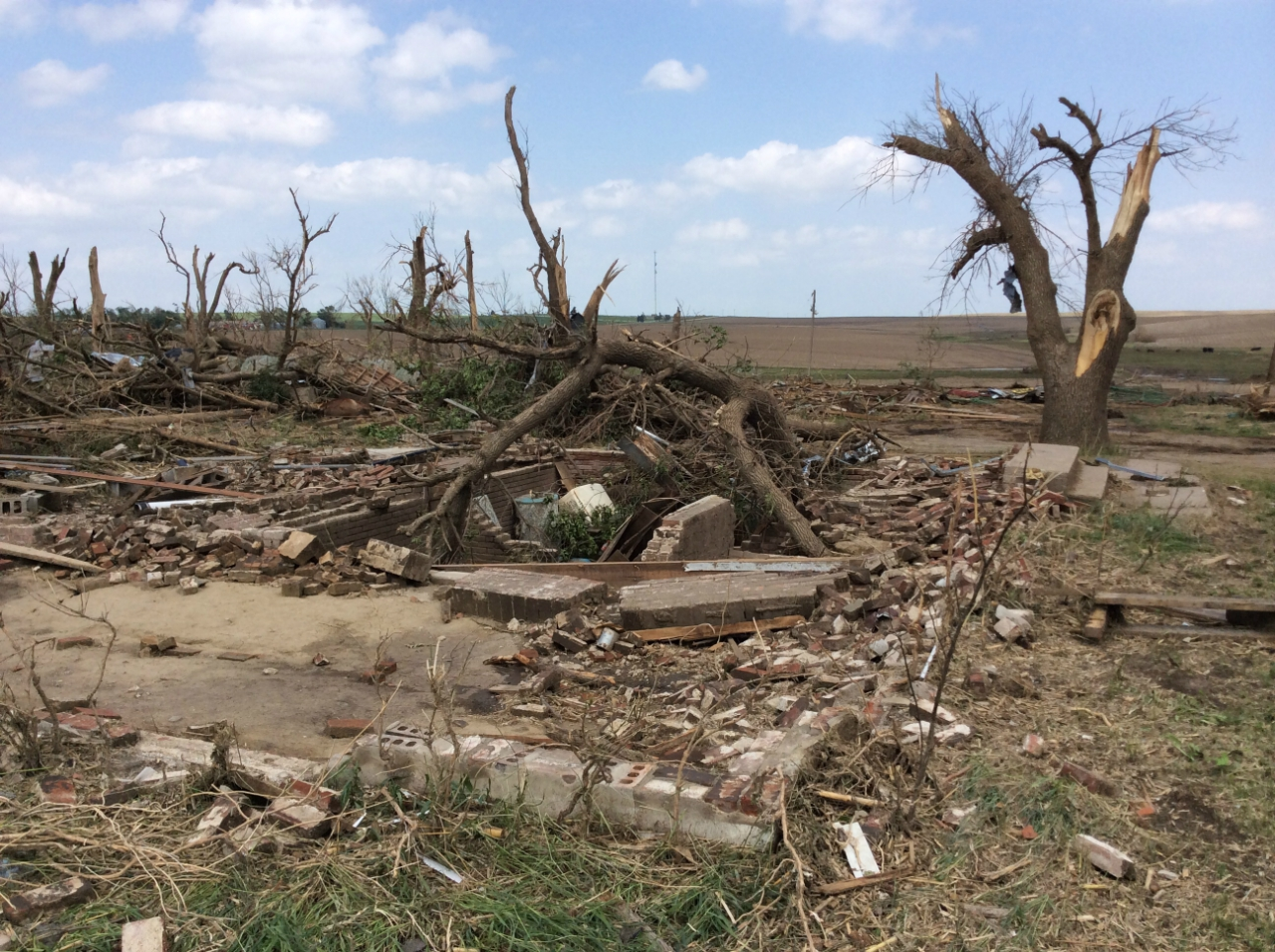
- A farmhouse wiped away along 567th Avenue, northeast of Coleridge.

Meteorological history
- Formed: June 17, 2014, 8:09 p.m. CDT (UTC−05:00)
- Dissipated: June 17, 2014, 8:56 p.m. CDT (UTC−05:00)
- Duration: 47 minutes

EF3 tornado
- on the Enhanced Fujita scale
- Highest winds: 136–165 mph (219–266 km/h)

Overall effects
- Fatalities: 0
- Injuries: 0
- Damage: $2 million (2014 USD)

A long-lived, slow-moving and cyclic supercell tracked across Cedar County, Nebraska during the evening hours on June 17. After the first tornado of the storm dissipated southwest of Hartington, the supercell dropped this large, multiple-vortex tornado northwest of Coleridge, heading in a southeastern direction. The first instance of significant damage inflicted by this tornado, was on 876th Road, where a barn was almost fully swept at EF2 intensity. To the southeast, a grain bin was tossed 300 yd (270 m) from one farmstead. Continuing east on 876th Road, the tornado inflicted its first EF3 damage indicator, where a former dehydration plant was leveled. Two semi trucks at this site were heavily damaged and all six grain bins were swept away as well. The tornado then continued east at EF2 intensity, and began to scrape the outskirts of Coleridge to the north, with some residences on the northern side of the village having suffered EF0 to EF1 damage. The tornado then displayed erratic movement, as it seemingly stalled while heading east-southeast, before then heading south-southwest. To the northeast of Coleridge on 567th Avenue, the tornado would impact a farmhouse and completely wipe it away from concrete foundation at EF3 intensity. Several outbuildings were destroyed at EF2 intensity and trees were debarked. The storm continued to move along the road as it headed south, passing by east of the village and occasionally impacting farmsteads, including one on 875th Road that was swept off its cinderblock foundation at EF3 intensity. Several trees were also heavily debarked before the tornado then abruptly headed southeast, before making a U-turn-like path and heading northeast. The tornado continued north before dissipating north of 876th Road, northeast of Coleridge.

This intense, and erratic tornado was the strongest of a family of tornadoes produced by the Cedar County supercell. Several farmhouses were struck by this tornado, though no casualties occurred. The storm grew to 2,059 yd (1.170 mi; 1.883 km) wide at its largest, and tracked along a deviant 8.24 mi (13.26 km) path. The parent supercell persisted onward into the night hours, producing several tornadoes, including two EF2 tornadoes near Laurel and Dixon. Coleridge saw a near direct hit with a violent F4 tornado during the evening hours of June 23, 2003, over a decade ago.

=== Wessington Springs, South Dakota ===
Wessington Springs, South Dakota
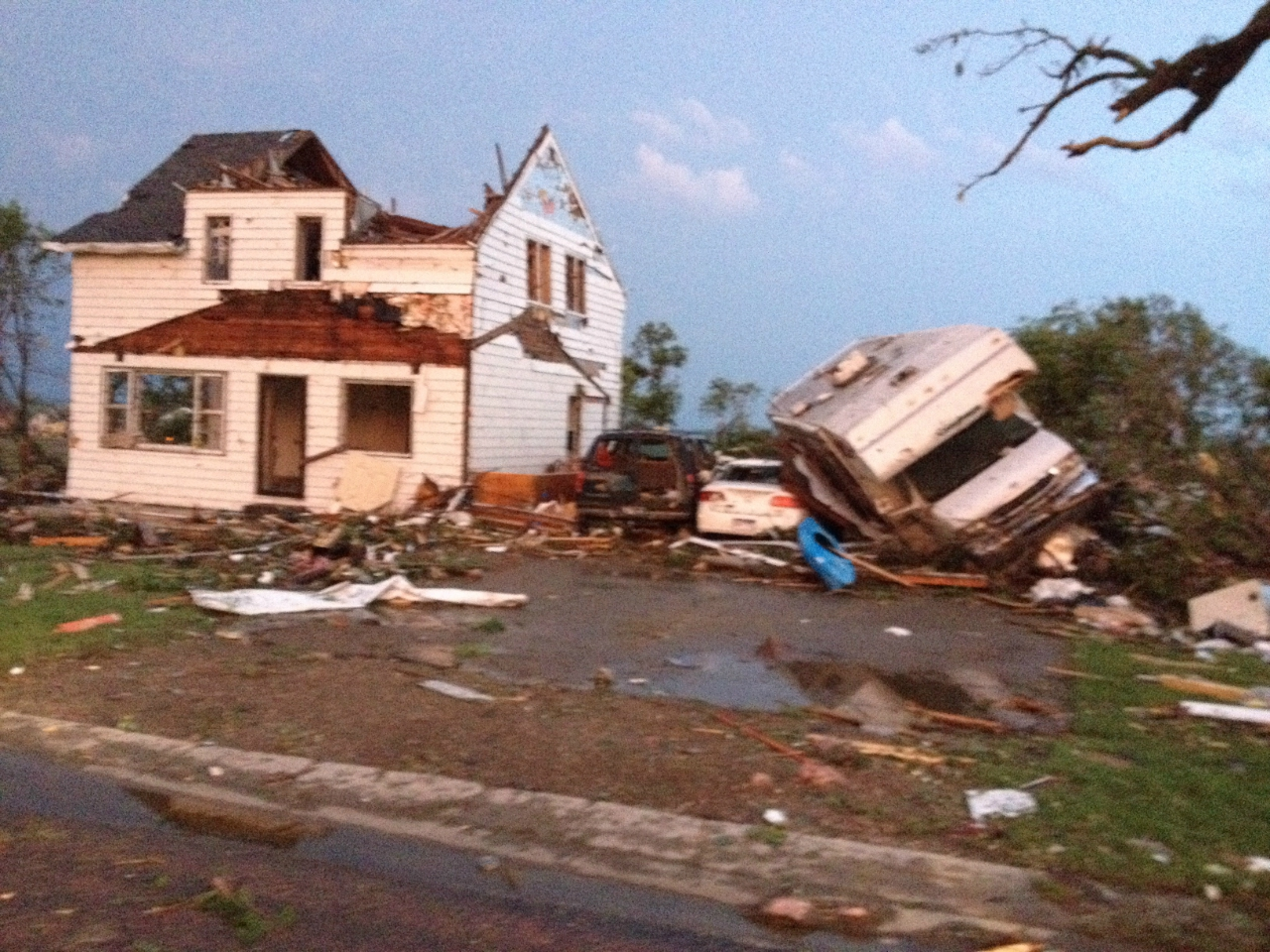
- A damaged residence in Wessington Springs.

Meteorological history
- Formed: June 18, 2014, 7:30 p.m. CDT (UTC−05:00)
- Dissipated: June 18, 2014, 7:52 p.m. CDT (UTC−05:00)
- Duration: 22 minutes

EF2 tornado
- on the Enhanced Fujita scale
- Highest winds: 135 mph (217 km/h)

Overall effects
- Fatalities: 0
- Injuries: 1
- Damage: $5.2 million (2014 USD)

During the evening hours on June 18, a supercell dropped this large and significant tornado on the southern side of Wessington Springs, in Jerauld County, South Dakota. The tornado began just south of the intersection of SD 34 and Dakota Avenue South. It rapidly intensifying and shortly after caused EF2 damage to a car dealership, where the exterior walls were collapsed. After crossing Dakota Avenue South, the tornado would enter Wessington Springs proper, tearing through neighborhoods on the southeastern side. One home on Blowers Avenue South, was impacted at mid-range EF2 intensity, as most walls were collapsed except for inner rooms. Paralleling the street, the tornado caused its strongest damage to a neighboring residence, with winds upwards into high-end EF2 intensity. Considerable roof damage occurred at this home, with nearby vehicles, including an RV, severely damaged by debris. The tornado continued to impact homes and a fuel station on 1st Street Southeast at EF2 intensity, as it was entering the eastern parts of town. A house on the same road had its roof ripped away with winds of 122 mph (196 km/h), suggesting mid-range EF2 intensity. To the north on Main Street East, a car was thrown through the air and took down a tree, before resting on top of it and another home suffered considerable wall damage at EF2 intensity. The last significant damage indicator, was a residence on Pershing Avenue, south of the town's elementary school, which had exterior wall collapse and its roof torn off.

After leaving Wessington Springs, the tornado traversed through empty fields, causing an unknown amount of damage to corn and soybean crops, before it dissipated northeast of the small city at 7:52 p.m. CDT (12:52 UTC).

Despite the extent of the damage, no fatalities occurred and one person was injured. An issued tornado warning likely saved countless of lives according to one source. The event lasted for 22 minutes, with the tornado spanning 200 yd (0.11 mi; 0.18 km) wide, and tracking for 2.22 mi (3.57 km).

=== Lane–Alpena, South Dakota ===
Lane–Alpena, South Dakota
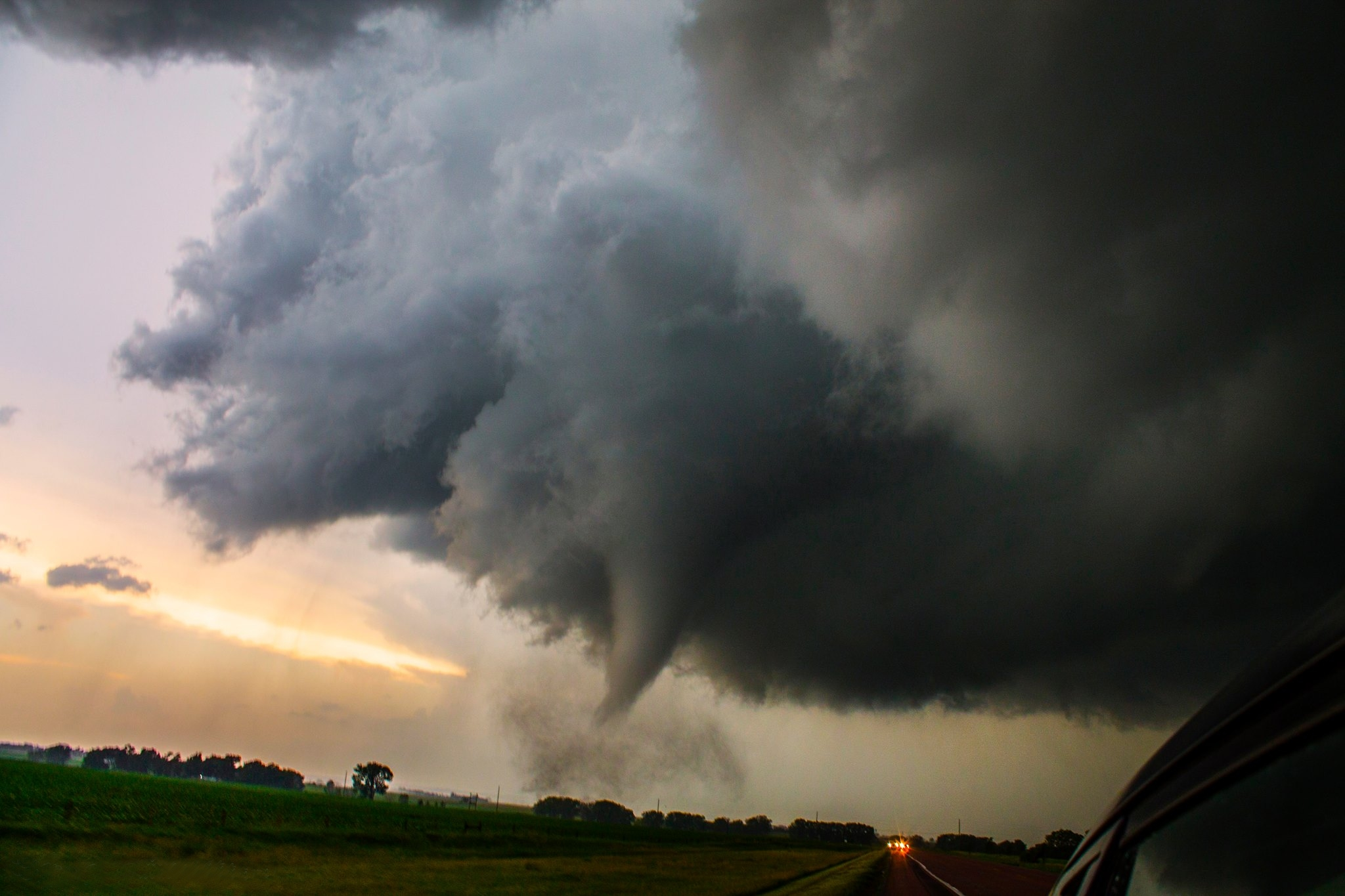
- The tornado near Lane

Meteorological history
- Formed: June 18, 2014, 7:43 p.m. CDT (UTC−05:00)
- Dissipated: June 18, 2014, 8:25 p.m. CDT (UTC−05:00)
- Duration: 42 minutes

EF4 tornado
- on the Enhanced Fujita scale
- Highest winds: 170 mph (270 km/h)

Overall effects
- Fatalities: 0
- Injuries: 2
- Damage: $300.000 (2014 USD)

This large, violent and shape-shifting tornado touched down southeast of Lane in eastern Jerauld County, along 231st Street. The tornado first moved northeast, before heading north and snapping the trunks of trees at EF1 intensity, while also causing notable field scouring. After crossing SD 34 at EF1 intensity, the tornado continued to the north, displaying strong multiple-vortex characteristics, as the suction vortices within the parent vortex danced and whipped around, passing by a farm, where a barn had its roof ripped off. The multiple-vortex tornado continued moving north, strengthening to EF2 intensity as a grove of trees had their trunks snapped. At the same time, gravel was scoured off of the road on 227th Street. A tornado warning was issued for much of eastern Jerauld County, but also neighboring Sanborn and Beadle counties, which included Wessington Springs, Woonsocket and Alpena at 7:57 p.m. CDT (12:57 UTC).

The tornado remained strong, causing EF2 damage to trees, whilst also beginning to scour fields at a significant amount, before beginning to approach a large farmstead on 223rd Street, southwest of Alpena. Now reaching EF4 intensity, the violent tornado would enter the farm, which was owned by the Jerauld County commissioner. The entire property was completely decimated and what the county commissioner described as being "sandblasted". He and his wife, alongside their dog sought shelter in the basement of their farmhouse. The home was completely swept away by the tornado, with debris falling down into the basement the couple and their dog were taking cover. The commissioner and his wife would survive the tornado with minor injuries, though their dog was killed by falling debris. Elsewhere on the farmstead, the tornado hurled and mangled machinery around, scoured fields completely clean and debarked trees at EF3 intensity. After leaving the farm, the tornado then began to shape-shift from a large stovepipe, to a more "snake" like appearance as it began to occlude to the north-northwest. Passing by west of Alpena, the tornado scoured another field completely clean at EF2 intensity, before weakening even further and crossing into Beadle County, eventually dissipating not long after its entry to the northwest of Alpena, along 220th Street.

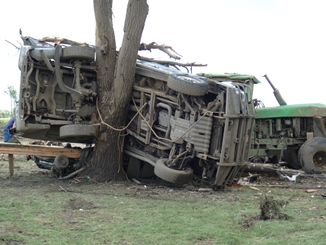
A truck was smashed into a tree by the tornado.

The tornado was the fifth tornado rated EF4 from the outbreak, and the only one to occur in South Dakota. The event lasted for 42 minutes, traveled for 11.65 mi (18.75 km) across Jerauld and Beadle counties, and was 880 yd (0.50 mi; 0.80 km) wide at its largest. It was the first violent tornado to occur in the state, since another happened in 2010. At least $300.000 in damages was inflicted by the tornado, primarily at the Jerauld County commissioner's farmstead, which was the most affected area in its path. Recovery was fast, with after two months, the county commissioner installed a concrete bunker in the new residence's basement.

== See also ==
- Weather of 2014
- List of North American tornadoes and tornado outbreaks
- List of F4 and EF4 tornadoes
  - List of F4 and EF4 tornadoes (2010–2019)
- Tornado outbreak of May 10–12, 2014 – A lesser impactful tornado outbreak that occurred a month prior.
- Tornado outbreak and derecho of June 16–18, 2010 – Another violent tornado outbreak across the northern Great Plains exactly 3 years prior
- Tornado outbreak and derecho of June 19–22, 2025 - Another violent outbreak which featured a derecho that would occur in June 11 years later and feature a extremely violent tornado.
