= 2014 Pilger tornado family =

Series of EF4 tornadoes in Northeast Nebraska

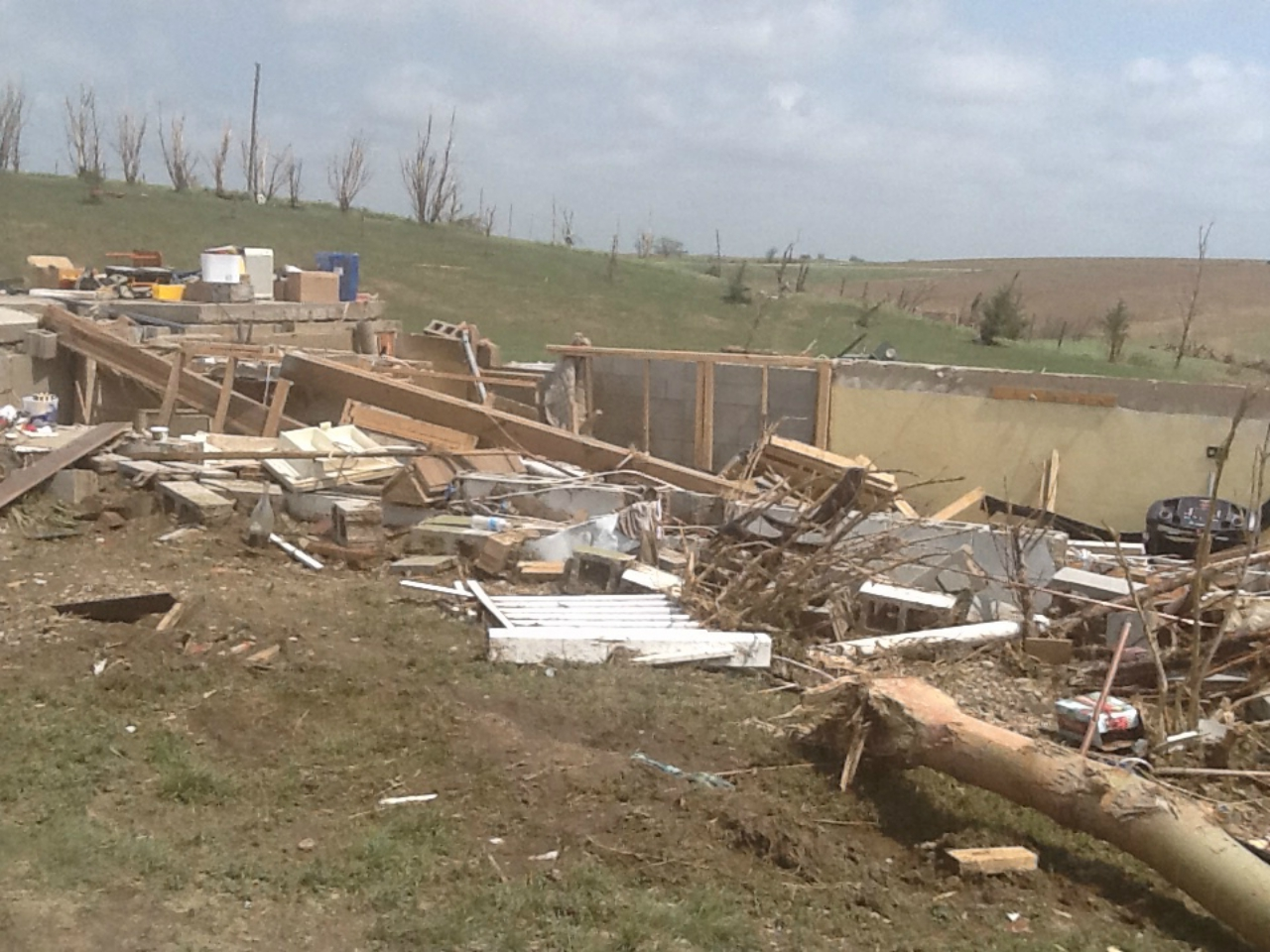
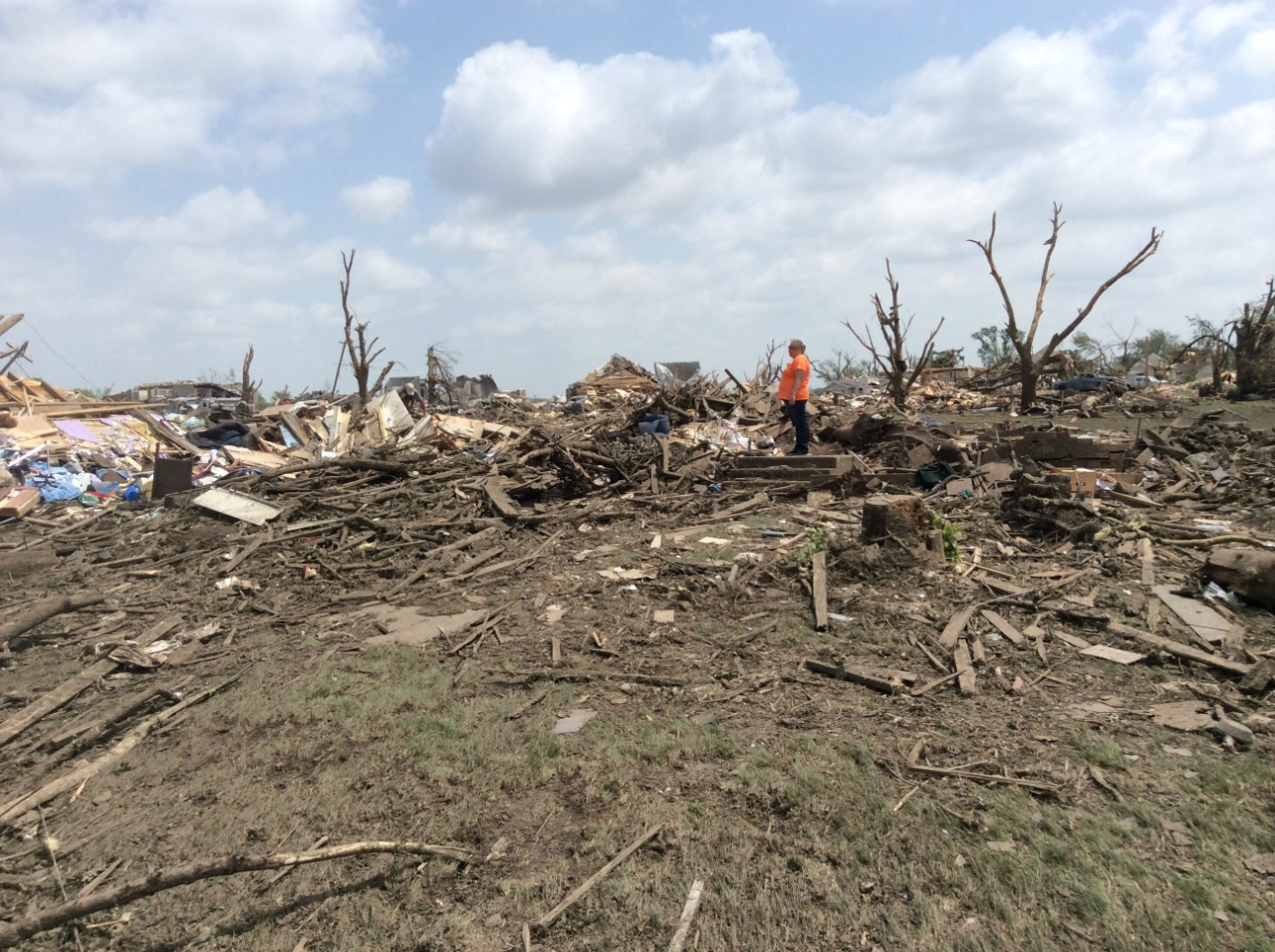
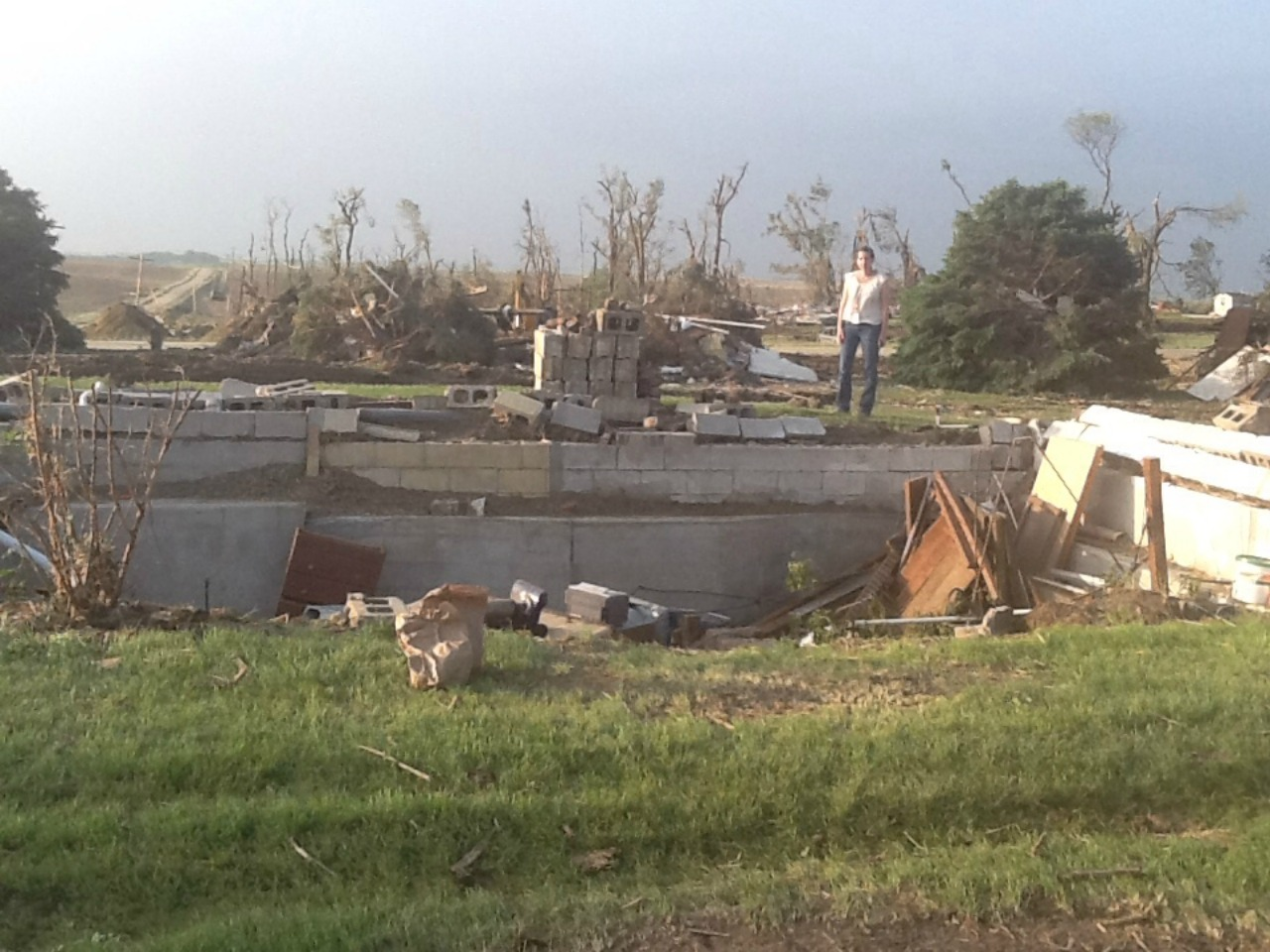
- Clockwise loop: A NEXRAD radar loop of the supercell responsible for the tornadoes; Low-end EF4 damage to a swept away home near Stanton; Complete destruction to a home in Pilger, with the damage rated at low-end EF4; A farmhouse near Wakefield destroyed at EF4 intensity.

Meteorological history
- Formed: June 16, 2014, 2:38 pm. CDT (UTC−05:00)
- Dissipated: June 16, 2014, 4:42 pm. CDT (UTC−05:00)
- Duration: 2 hours and 4 minutes

Tornado family
- Tornadoes: 6
- Max. rating: EF4 tornado
- Highest winds: 191 mph (307 km/h) (First Pilger tornado)

Overall effects
- Fatalities: 2
- Injuries: 20
- Damage: $20.32 million (2014 USD)
- Areas affected: Stanton, Cuming, Wayne and Dixon Counties; specifically near Stanton, Pilger, and Wakefield, Nebraska, United States
- Part of the Tornado outbreak of June 16-18, 2014 and tornadoes of 2014

On the afternoon and early evening of June 16, 2014, a powerful cyclic supercell struck northeast Nebraska, producing six tornadoes, including four violent (EF4+) tornadoes. The tornadoes impacted areas east of Norfolk, including the village of Pilger, which sustained major damage, as well as farmsteads near Stanton, and Wakefield. This outbreak resulted in two fatalities, 20 injuries, and approximately $20.92 million (2014 USD) in damages. The event was part of the tornado outbreak of June 16–18, 2014, and the supercell produced the year's third, fourth, fifth, and sixth violent tornadoes.

The first tornado touched down in an open field near Stanton but quickly dissipated. A more significant tornado then formed near Stanton. This tornado traveled for approximately 12 miles, causing extensive damage to several farmsteads and sweeping away a few farmhouses before lifting north of Dewey. Shortly thereafter, the supercell produced two additional violent tornadoes, subsequently becoming twin EF4 tornadoes. One of these tornadoes struck the village of Pilger directly, resulting in devastating damage and one death. The other twin over to the east leveled a farmhouse before dissipating east of Altona, Nebraska, responsible for a second fatality. Meanwhile, the western twin tornado, which devastated Pilger earlier, continued to wreak havoc across farmlands before eventually being absorbed by the Wakefield tornado. The final violent tornado from the supercell swept away three farmhouses and inflicted significant damage on multiple other farmsteads before dissipating north of Wakefield. The sixth and last tornado produced by the supercell was weak and short-lived.

== Meteorological setup ==
=== Episode narrative ===
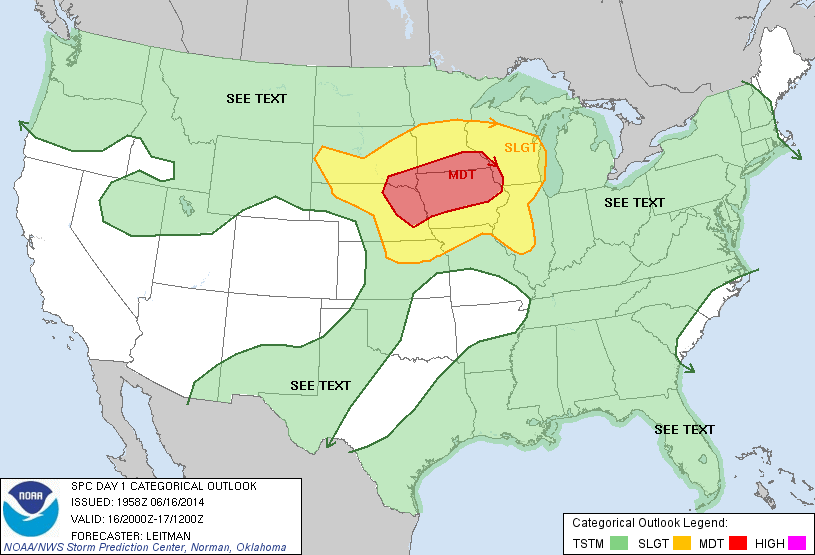
The 20z SPC Convective Outlook issued for June 16, 2014

On June 13, 2014, the Storm Prediction Center (SPC) noted the possibility of severe weather associated with potential mesoscale convective systems in the northern United States for June 16–18. However, the predictability of this event was too low for the SPC to designate areas at risk of severe weather. The following day, the SPC revised their forecasts, indicating a slight risk for severe activity for areas around the confluence of the Big Sioux and Missouri rivers two days before the eventual tornado outbreak. The development of a low-pressure area and increasing atmospheric instability were expected to be contributing factors. Forecasts remained relatively unchanged on June 15, though the probability for "significant severe weather" was predicted for a large area of northern Iowa and adjacent areas.

=== Event narrative ===
The morning of June 16 was marked only by isolated storms in the Nebraska area with only marginal severe weather. Beginning at around 0800 UTC, however, favorable conditions for severe weather, particularly for large hail, began to build across central Nebraska. Moisture from the Gulf of Mexico began to make its way into southern Nebraska and over Kansas, raising dew points over the region. In addition, the prevalence of altocumulus castellanus clouds was an indicator of additional severe weather later in the day. The flow of moisture into the region was further enhanced by an eastward progressing warm front, and at 0600 UTC on June 16, the SPC once again issued a slight risk for severe weather for the eastern halves of South Dakota, Nebraska, and extending eastward into the western Great Lakes region. This was followed shortly after by the day's first severe thunderstorm watch, issued for primarily eastern Nebraska in response to a developing line of supercells. An hour later, the SPC upgraded some areas previously under a slight risk for severe weather to a moderate risk as a result of continuously increasing moisture content and CAPE in the atmosphere. At 1613 UTC, the SPC issued the first of three public severe weather outlooks for the day, covering a region centered on Sioux City, Iowa. A Particularly Dangerous Situation tornado watch was issued later that afternoon.

== Tornado summaries ==
Confirmed tornadoes by Enhanced Fujita rating
EFU	EF0	EF1	EF2	EF3	EF4	EF5	Total
0	2	0	0	0	4	0	6

Stanton, Nebraska
- The tornado at peak intensity before becoming rain-wrapped north of Stanton.

Meteorological history
- Formed: June 16, 2014, 3:42 PM CDT (UTC−05:00)
- Dissipated: June 16, 2014, 4:11 PM CDT (UTC−05:00)
- Duration: 29 minutes

EF4 tornado
- on the Enhanced Fujita scale
- Max width: 400 yd (0.23 mi; 0.37 km)
- Path length: 12.11 mi (19.49 km)
- Highest winds: 170 mph (270 km/h)

Overall effects
- Fatalities: 0
- Injuries: 0
- Damage: $2.25 million (2014 United States dollar)
- Areas affected: Southwest and north of Stanton (City)

=== Stanton, Nebraska ===
==== Start of the first violent tornado ====
The first tornado produced by the supercell was a brief, weak EF0 tornado that was recorded by multiple storm chasers in an open field south of Stanton. The tornado lasted two minutes, peaked at 100 yards (91 m), and traveled for 1.25 miles (2.01 km). After that tornado dissipated, the storm spawned the first violent tornado, which touched down near 560th Avenue, causing minor damage to trees along the road. It moved northeastward over open terrain with few damage indicators, although an area of snapped trees near 561st Avenue received a high-end EF1 rating. The tornado continued to cause minimal EF0 damage to trees as it crossed the Elkhorn River. It then quickly intensified and reached EF2 strength as it crossed N-24 west of Stanton. An outbuilding was destroyed and power poles along N-24 were snapped. The tornado then weakened to EF1 strength, continuing to snap trees and power poles before rapidly intensifying to a much stronger high-end EF3 intensity as it struck a farmstead along 563rd 1/2 Avenue. A farmhouse was leveled, an outbuilding on the property was demolished, and trees were snapped. During this time, the tornado reached its maximum width of 400 yards (370 m).

==== Passing Stanton and occlusion north of town ====
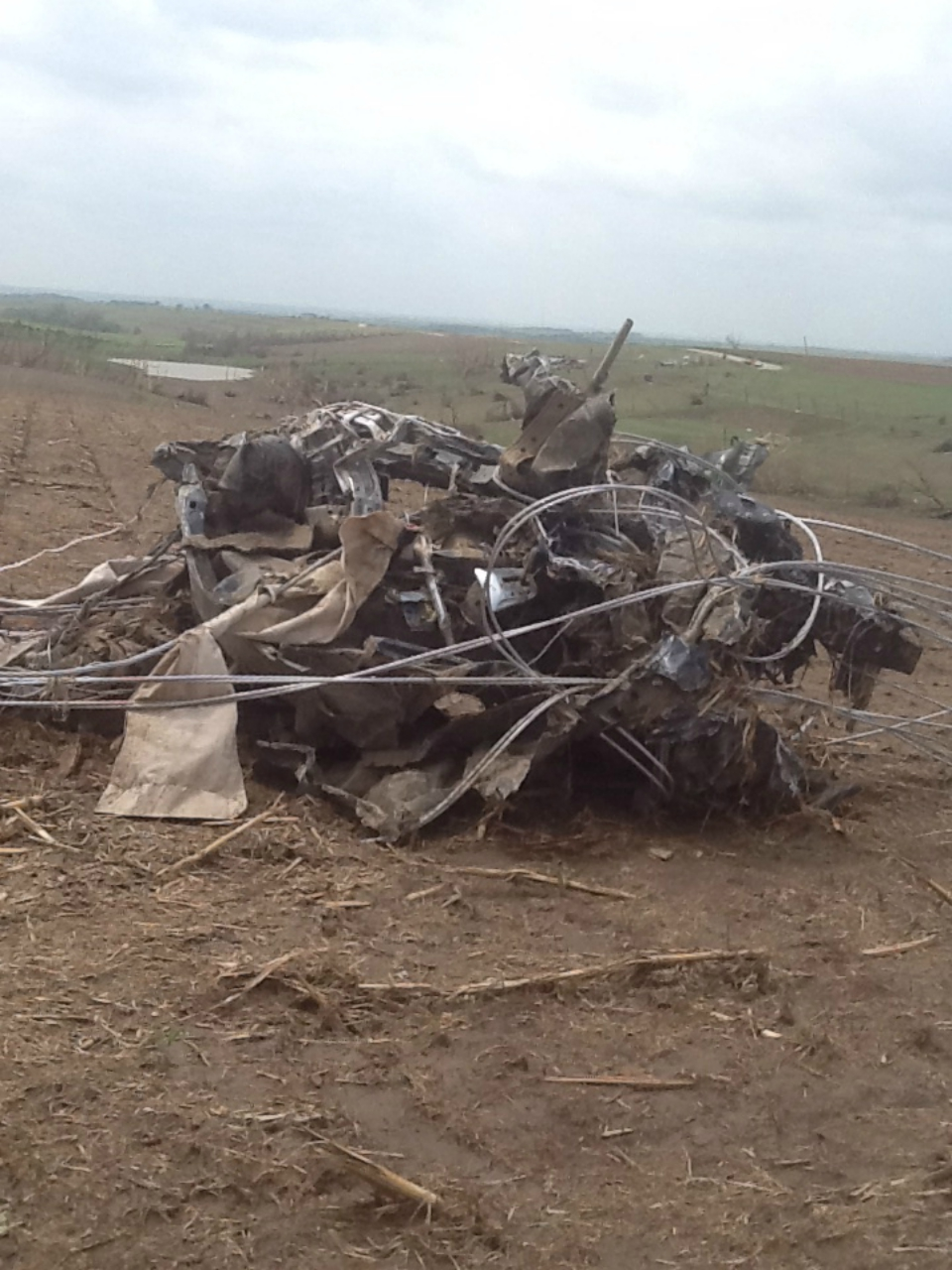
Car that was thrown a quarter-mile away and was mangled and folded into a ball

The tornado then weakened to EF2 intensity as it struck another farmstead, causing major roof damage to the farmhouse, partial wall collapse, and the destruction of outbuildings. A semi-truck was overturned. The tornado then moved over open terrain with few damage indicators; this segment was rated EF0 as a result. As it reached 565th Road, the tornado abruptly became violent, leveling and sweeping away a home along 565th Road at low-end EF4 intensity with winds of 170 mph (270 km/h). Trees at this farmstead were snapped and debarked, an outbuilding was obliterated, and another home was also leveled and swept away. Two vehicles were thrown 0.25 miles (0.40 km) away, mangled, with one crushed into a ball. The tornado continued traveling northeastward, snapping multiple softwood trees, and became violent once more as it crossed 842nd Road on Payne Creek. A well-built farmhouse was swept away at low-end EF4 intensity, with nearby trees severely debarked and an outbuilding destroyed. A car was thrown a quarter of a mile away, mangled and folded into a ball. Another nearby home suffered light roof damage. The tornado continued to move northeast, destroying a barn with low-end EF2 damage before dissipating northwest of Dewey.

The tornado traveled 12.11 miles (19.49 km), lasted 29 minutes, caused no injuries or fatalities, inflicted $2.25 million (2014 USD) in damages, and had a maximum wind speed of 170 mph (270 km/h).

Pilger, Nebraska
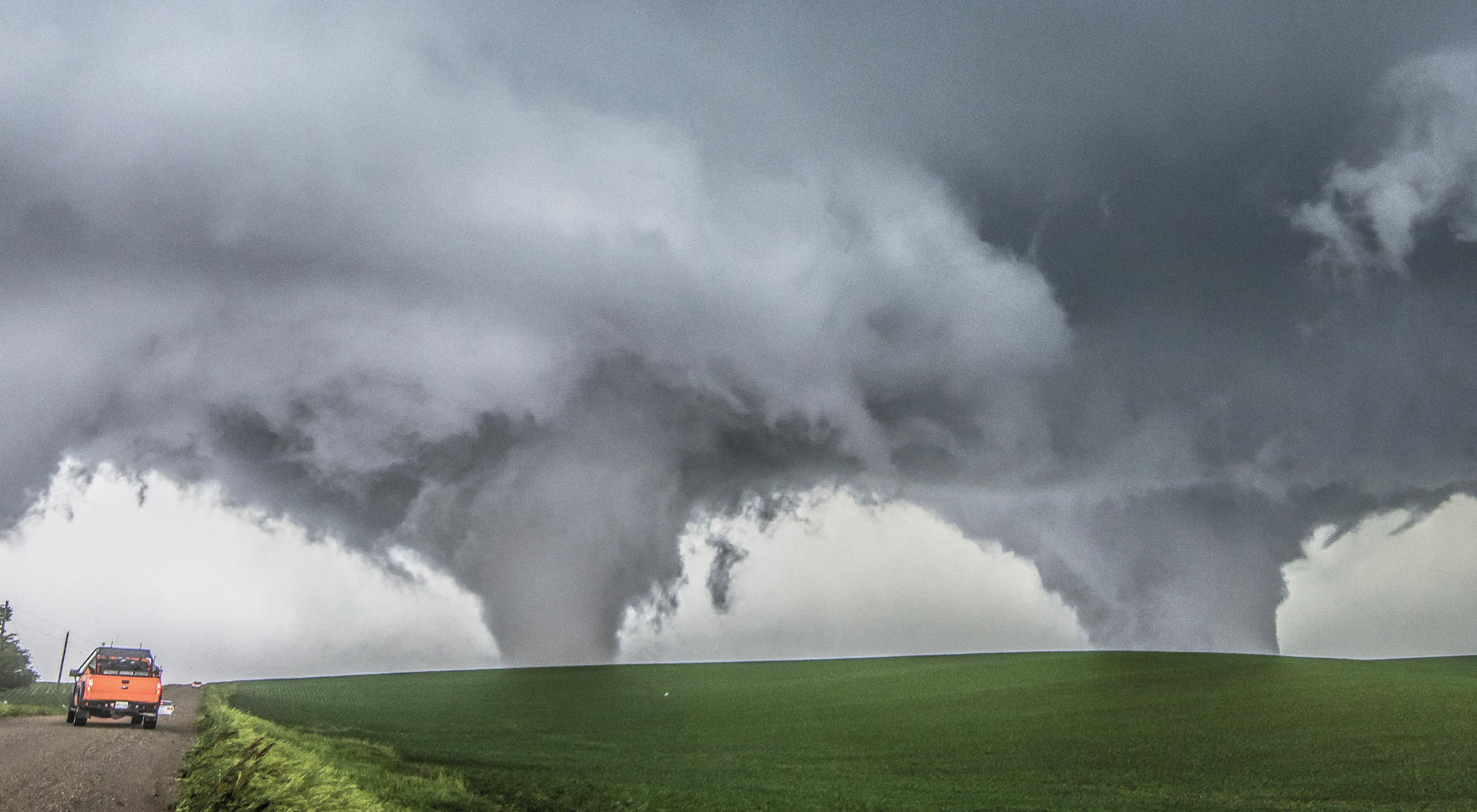
- The two EF4 tornadoes next to each other.

Meteorological history
- Formed: June 16, 2014, (Note: First tornado) 4:00 PM CDT (UTC−05:00); June 16, 2014, (Note: Second tornado) 4:13 PM CDT (UTC−05:00)
- Dissipated: June 16, 2014, 4:46 PM CDT (UTC−05:00); June 16, 2014, 4:39 PM CDT (UTC−05:00)
- Duration: 46 minutes; 26 minutes

EF4 tornadoes
- Max width: 500 yd (0.28 mi; 0.46 km)
- Path length: 23.94 mi (38.53 km); 11.5 mi (18.5 km)
- Highest winds: 191 mph (307 km/h); 170 mph (270 km/h)

Overall effects
- Fatalities: 2 (Note: Both tornadoes caused one fatality each.)
- Injuries: 20
- Damage: $14.25 million (2014 USD); $1.375 million (2014 USD)
- Areas affected: Stanton, Cuming and Wayne Counties; particularly around Pilger

=== Pilger, Nebraska ===
==== Formation of the first twin ====
The supercell recycled and produced its third tornado, which was also the second violent tornado of the day. At 4:00 p.m. CDT, the tornado touched down 5.5 miles (8.9 km) southwest of Pilger on 570 Avenue near Cedar Creek, causing minor damage to trees. It strengthened to high-end EF1 intensity on 837th Road, snapping some trees and power poles, before quickly weakening back to EF0. The tornado continued northeast, regaining EF1 strength on 572 Avenue, where it snapped trees and caused minor roof damage to an outbuilding. The tornado then changed direction to north-northeast and intensified to low-end EF2 strength with winds of 112 mph (180 km/h). At this intensity, several outbuildings near Willers Cove North Dr were flattened, and additional trees were snapped. The tornado made a sharp northeast turn, crossing the Elkhorn River before entering Pilger.

==== Impact on Pilger ====
Alongside Highway 15, west of town, the tornado intensified further. An unanchored home was swept away at high-end EF3 intensity, and a feed store north of the home was leveled. An RV was completely wrecked and mangled, and trees were snapped. The tornado crossed South Murray Street, rapidly intensifying to near high-end EF4 intensity. A well-constructed home on this street was swept away, and nearby homes were mostly leveled, leaving only a few interior walls standing. Homes near the intersection of West Black Hills Road and South Murray Street were flattened, trees were debarked, and mobile homes along W Elm Street were obliterated. Debris was scattered, and a five-year-old girl was killed around this area.

==== Continued devastation and formation of second twin ====
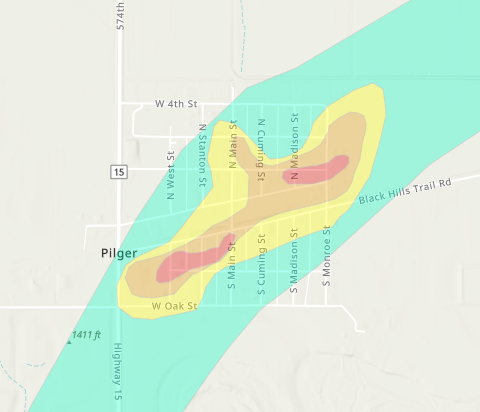
Path of the Pilger tornado going right through the town. Key EF0 65–85 mph EF1 86–110 mph EF2 111–135 mph EF3 136–165 mph EF4 166–200 mph ⎯ Center of the tornado

The tornado continued its path of destruction, sweeping away a home along S Stanton St at near high-end EF4 intensity. An entire home was shifted off its foundation further upstream. On S Main Street, a row of well-built homes was swept away with estimated wind speeds of 179 mph (288 km/h). The tornado then crossed Black Hills Trail Road into downtown Pilger, where it weakened to mid-range EF3 strength. Multiple cars were thrown and heavily damaged, a couple of outbuildings were destroyed, and the town's grain silos were razed. The silos were replaced a few months later. A church was destroyed, and a small business alongside N Main Street suffered severe damage. The tornado then rapidly intensified to near high-end EF4 strength. On E 2nd Street, another row of homes was flattened. Along the street, a well-constructed home at the intersection of E 2nd Street and N Monroe Street was completely swept off its foundation at 189 mph (304 km/h). The old and historic Wisner-Pilger Middle School on S 2nd Street sustained major damage and was left unrecoverable; it was later demolished. St. John Lutheran Church was leveled and partially swept away at near high-end EF4 intensity, leaving only the bell tower standing. The tornado left Pilger, resulting in the death of a 5-year old girl, two dozen injuries including the child's mother who attempted to take cover in a storm cellar, and $14 million in damages.

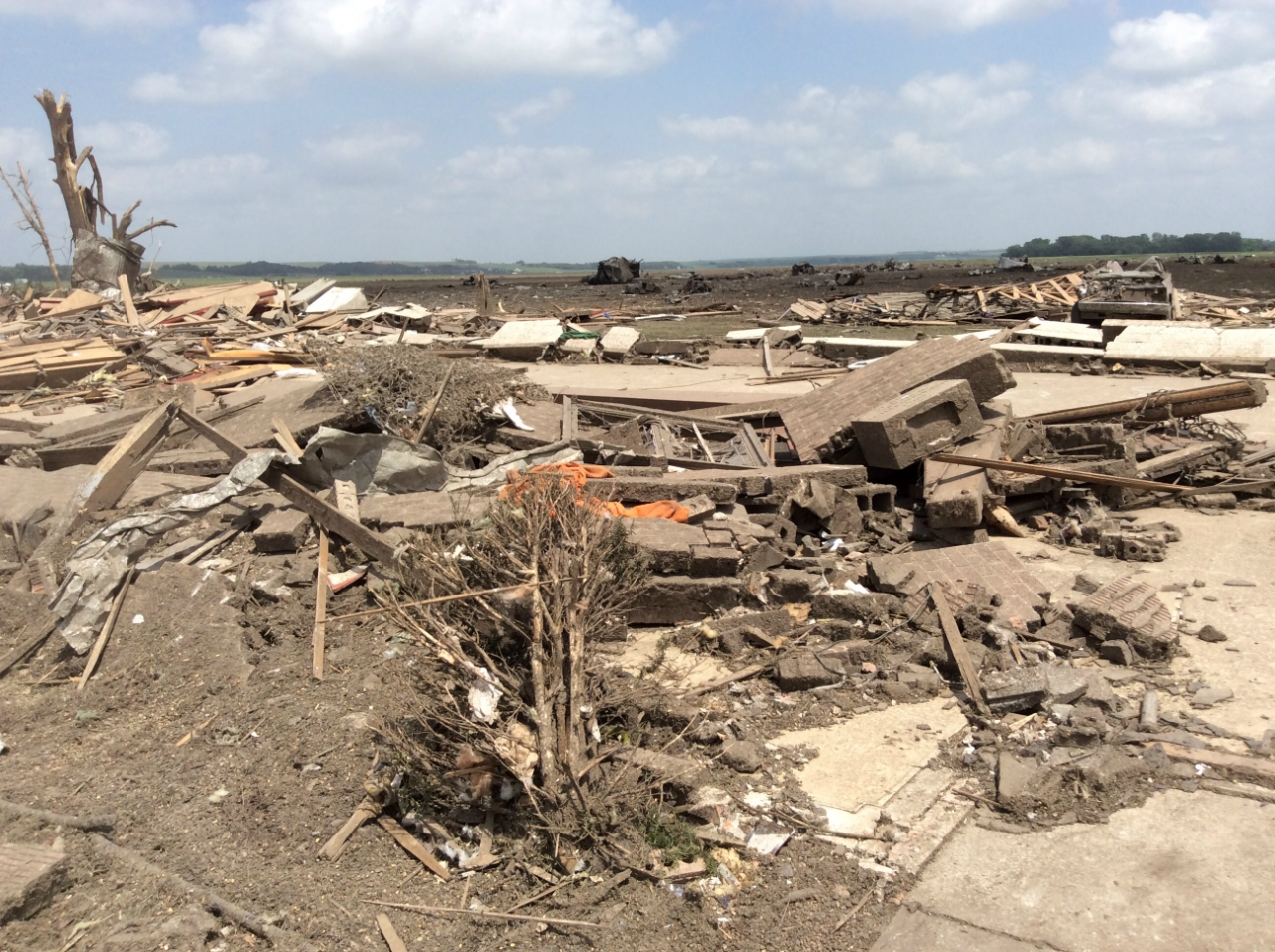
St. John Lutheran Church completely leveled at 188 mph (303 km/h)

Around the same time that this tornado was about to enter town, the supercell produced its fourth tornado, the third violent tornado of the day. This tornado touched down two miles south of Pilger or six miles west of Wisner at 4:13 p.m. CDT, causing light damage to many trees. It strengthened, snapping trees, collapsing the walls of several barns, and bringing down power lines. The tornado then weakened back to EF0 intensity, causing minimal damage to trees and an outbuilding. Both the initial tornado and second tornado to the east, continued to expand in size as they moved through the rural farmland of northwestern Cuming County. The western, Pilger tornado struck a farmstead along Highway 12 at mid-range EF2 intensity, ripping away a large part of the roof and leveling an outbuilding across the road. It then reattained EF3 intensity, causing substantial tree damage and removing the roof from a home on U Road. Meanwhile, the second eastern tornado strengthened, destroying a barn at low-end EF2 strength and causing minor roof damage. It then weakened to EF1, snapping trees and demolishing another outbuilding. The western, Pilger tornado destroyed a barn at low-end EF2 intensity on 412 Road. As the eastern tornado intensified to EF3, it toppled and bent an electrical transmission line and destroyed a nearby outbuilding. At this point, both tornadoes were paralleling each other northwest of Wisner. Another home on 412 Road sustained significant roof damage with winds of 122 mph (196 km/h).

==== Dual tornadoes and dissipation of the second tornado ====
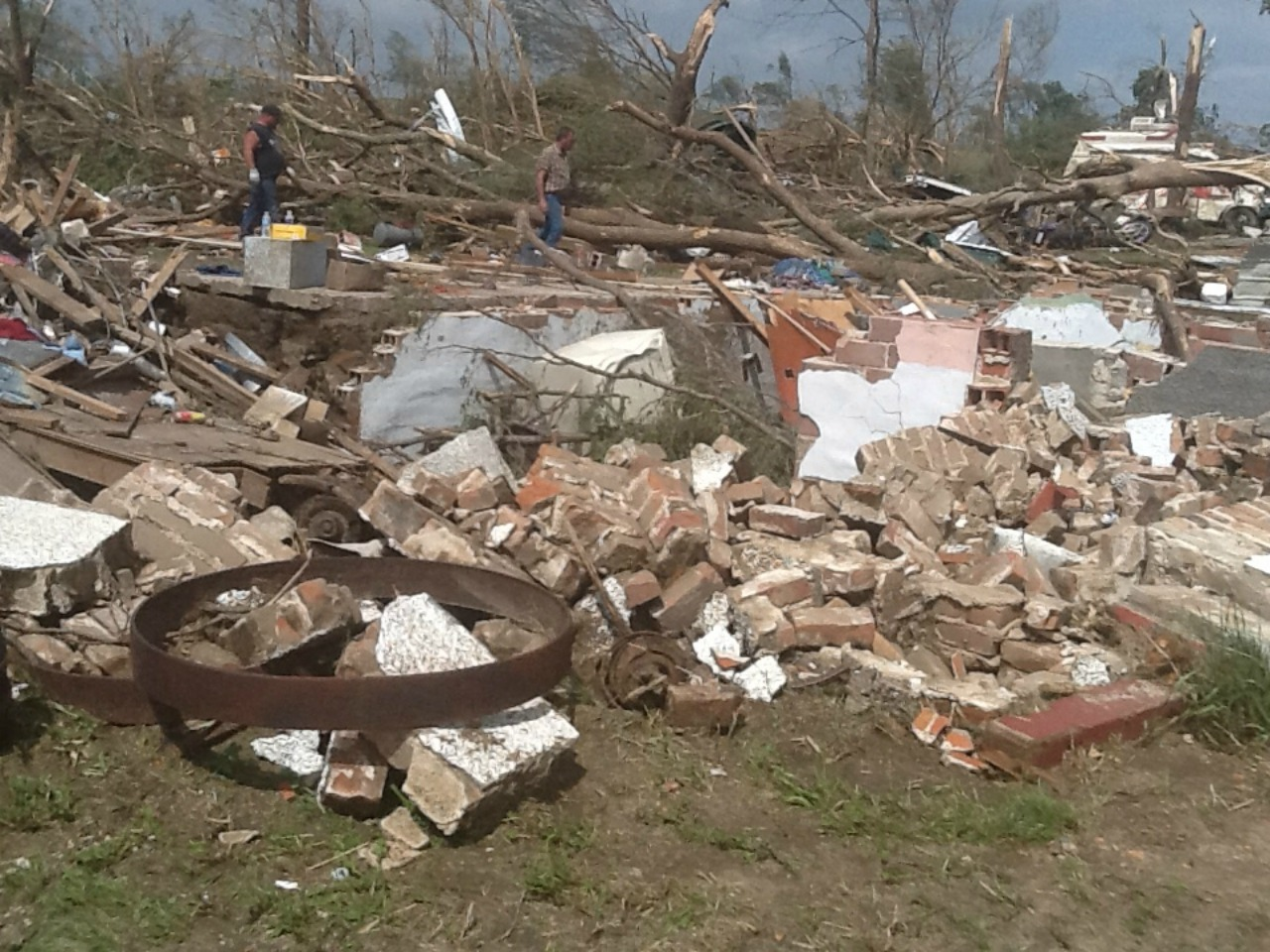
A home leveled by the second Pilger tornado

The eastern tornado, far north-northwest of Wisner, crossed directly in front of the Pilger twin near X Road, where it caused its most violent damage. A farmhouse was completely leveled with winds reaching 170 mph (270 km/h), and several barns on the farmstead were swept away. Trees in the area were debarked. As the second tornado moved north, the Pilger tornado approached from the east and re-intensified to low-end EF4 strength. It struck another farmstead at the intersection of X Road and 412 Road, sweeping away a farmhouse, lofting a car into the basement of the home, and destroying a barn. The second tornado maintained EF2 intensity as it demolished another barn. A 74-year-old man from Clarkson was killed when his car was flipped off the road by the tornado. The tornado then slightly strengthened to high-end EF2 intensity, causing severe damage to the exterior walls of a home before abruptly dissipating in southern Wayne County.

The second tornado was on the ground for 17 minutes, traveled 11.5 miles (18.5 km), and had a peak width of 500 yards (460 m). It caused US$1.375 million in damages, making it the least costly out of the four EF4 tornadoes. It killed one person, and had maximum wind speeds of 170 mph (270 km/h).

==== Endpoint of Pilger tornado ====
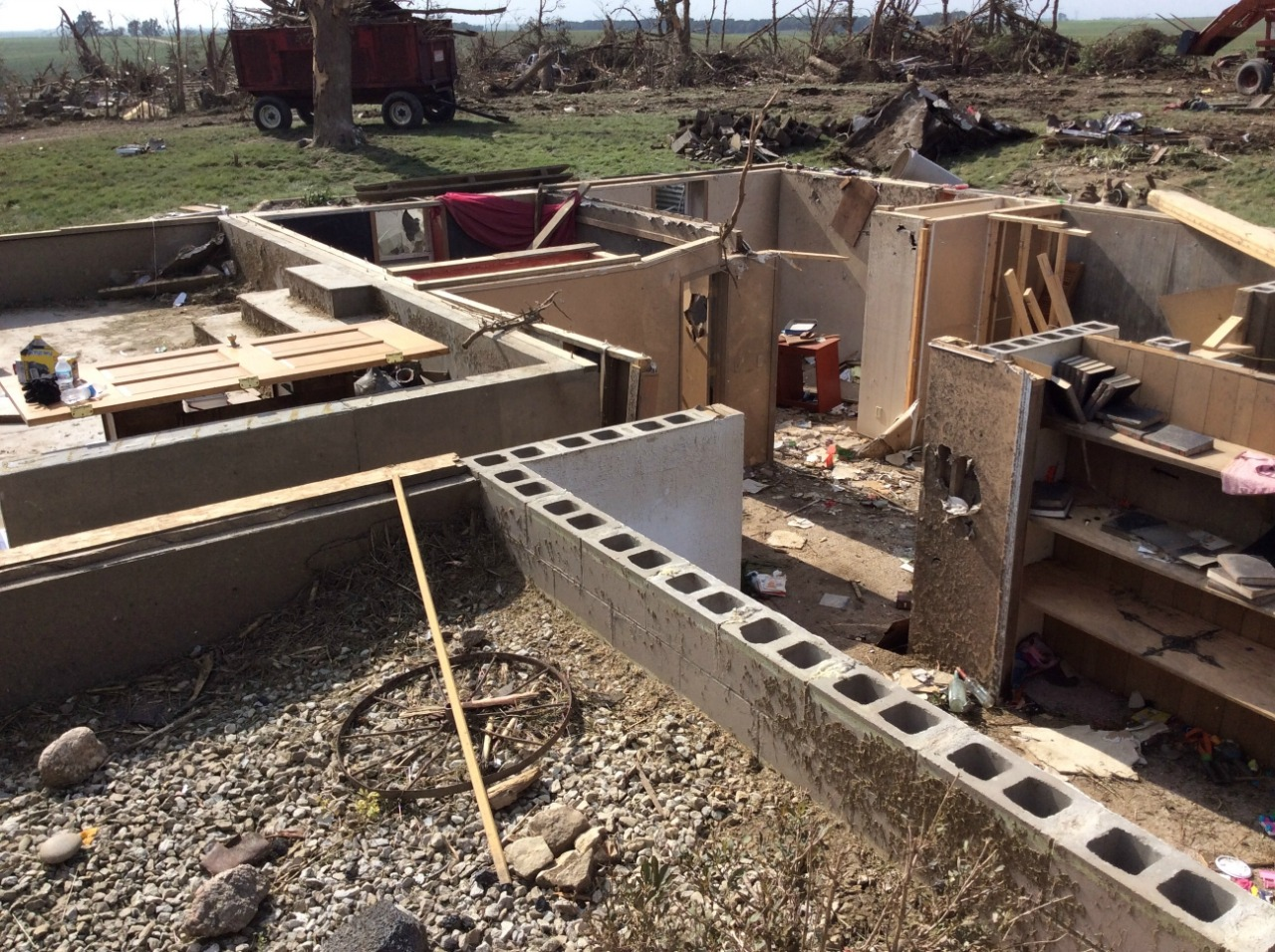
High-end EF4 damage done to a farmhouse by the Pilger tornado

The remaining Pilger tornado crossed X Road and struck another farmstead, destroying barns and snapping more trees at EF1 strength. As it passed near St. Paul's Lutheran Cemetery, the tornado entered Wayne County, causing additional tree damage. The tornado abruptly intensified to high-end EF4 strength along 581st Avenue. A well-built farmhouse was swept clean off its foundation with estimated wind speeds of 191 mph (307 km/h). Numerous trees around the farmstead were snapped before the tornado moved northeast. The tornado made a sharp turn to the east, shrinking in size as the parent supercell began to recycle. The Pilger tornado accelerated in speed and rapidly intensified to mid-range EF4 strength as it struck another farmstead on 848th Road. The farmhouse was swept away with winds of 182 mph (293 km/h). As the tornado began its rope-out phase, it gained speed and interacted with the developing Wakefield tornado, undergoing a Fujiwhara effect. The Pilger tornado became intense again, mangling a metal truss tower and demolished an outbuilding on 849th Road before being absorbed into the larger and stronger Wakefield tornado, which led to its dissipation.

The Pilger tornado was the strongest and longest tracked tornado in its family, with maximum wind speeds up to 191 mph (307 km/h) and traveling for 23.94 miles (38.53 km) along a 46-minute lifespan. It was also the costliest out of the four EF4 tornadoes, causing exclusive monetary losses of US$14.25 million.

Wakefield, Nebraska
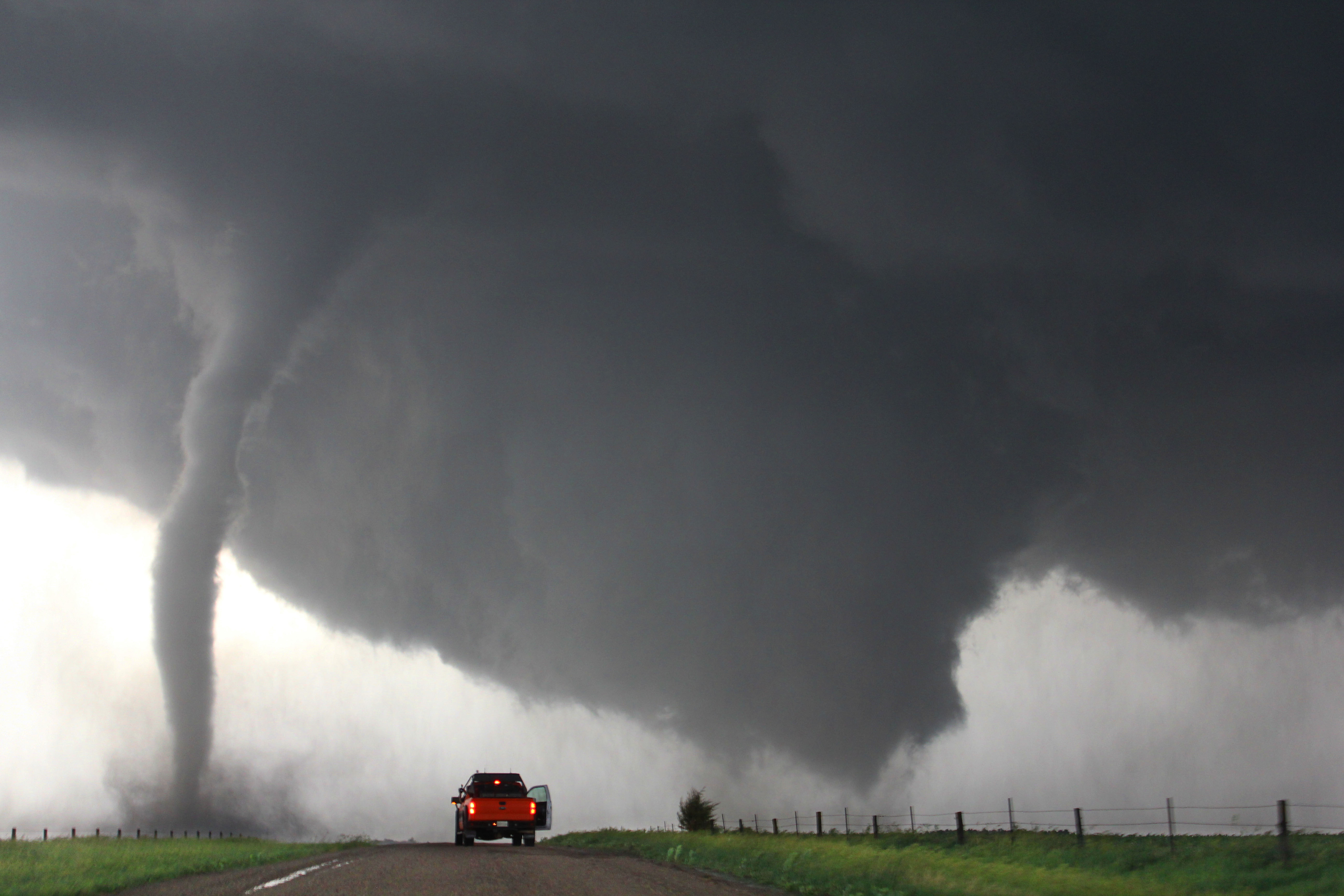
- The Wakefield tornado touching down on the right, with the first Pilger tornado roping out and interacting with the newly developed tornado.

Meteorological history
- Formed: June 16, 2014, 4:40 PM CDT (UTC−05:00)
- Dissipated: June 16, 2014, 5:08 PM CDT (UTC−05:00)
- Duration: 28 minutes

EF4 tornado
- on the Enhanced Fujita scale
- Max width: 530 yd (0.30 mi; 0.48 km)
- Path length: 15.84 mi (25.49 km)
- Highest winds: 170 mph (270 km/h)

Overall effects
- Fatalities: 0
- Injuries: 0
- Damage: $3.05 million (2014 United States dollar)
- Areas affected: Northwest of Pender to east and north of Wakefield

=== Wakefield, Nebraska ===
==== Beginning phases ====
As the Pilger tornado was entering its roping-out phase, the supercell produced the fourth and final violent tornado, which touched down approximately 8 miles (13 km) north of Wisner at 4:40 p.m. CDT. This tornado initially strengthened to EF1 intensity, leveling an outbuilding as it moved eastward. The tornado then made a sharp turn to the northeast, crossing Highway 16. As it continued its path, it intensified further, razing a barn and advancing northeast. During this time, the Pilger tornado was absorbed and dissipated into the Wakefield tornado, which had begun to take on a wedge shape. As the tornado continued along 849th Road, it snapped wooden power poles and made a sharp turn to the northwest. It impacted another farmstead, where a farmhouse was ripped away, and several trees were snapped. The tornado maintained EF2 intensity as it moved northward. Along 851st Road, it caused significant damage to barns, and another home on 852nd Road suffered extensive damage, with its roof blown off. Two additional homes located on 585th Avenue and 853rd Road experienced severe damage, either losing half of their roofs or having their roofs completely ripped off. Further north, the tornado struck another farmstead, leveling an outbuilding, causing significant roof loss to a metal building, and denting a grain silo. A two-story structure sustained minor damage, and a wooden power pole was snapped, indicating low-end EF2 strength.

==== Violent intensification ====
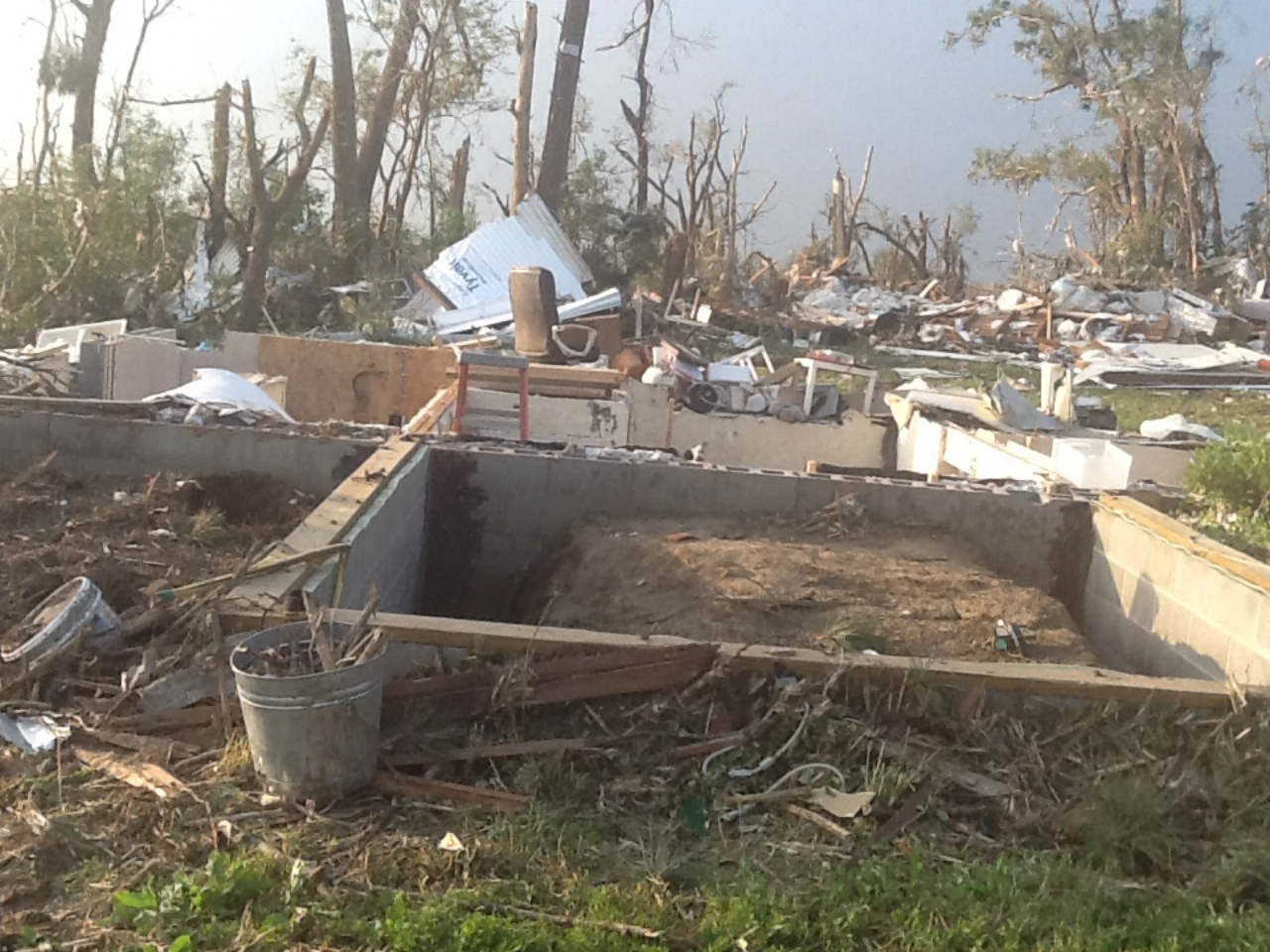
A farmhouse that was obliterated at estimated 170 mph (270 km/h) windspeeds.

The tornado rapidly intensified to low-end EF4 strength as it impacted three farmsteads at the intersection of 585th Avenue and 854th Road. At the first farmstead on 585th Avenue, the farmhouse was leveled, and a second, poorly built home on the same property was also destroyed. The second farmstead, located north of 854th Road, sustained devastating damage. A well-built home was swept away, multiple trees were snapped, and another home on the same property lost half of its roof. The barn on this property was completely demolished, and a power pole on 854th Road was snapped. The final farmstead at this intersection, located west of 585th Road, had a poorly anchored home completely swept away. This home had questionable construction, and several trees on the property were snapped and debarked. The tornado briefly weakened to EF3 intensity before becoming violent once more. It swept away another home along 585th Avenue, leveled an outbuilding, and damaged a grain bin, with additional tree snapping in the vicinity.

==== End stages of the final violent tornado ====
As the tornado continued its northern trajectory, it caused further tree damage and pockets of EF2-level damage. Several farmhouses east of Wakefield suffered significant roof damage before the tornado entered Dixon County. The tornado maintained EF1 intensity as it traveled along 586th Avenue, snapping multiple trees and heavily damaging barns. The tornado dissipated at 5:08 p.m. CDT after being on the ground 28 minutes covering 16.22 miles (26.10 km). It was the largest tornado produced by the supercell, with a peak width of 530 yards (480 m).

The tornado caused US$3.05 million in damages, with no fatalities or injuries reported. Its maximum wind speeds were estimated at 170 mph (270 km/h). Another brief and weak tornado touchdown near Hubbard and traveled for 0.26 miles (0.42 km).

== Aftermath ==
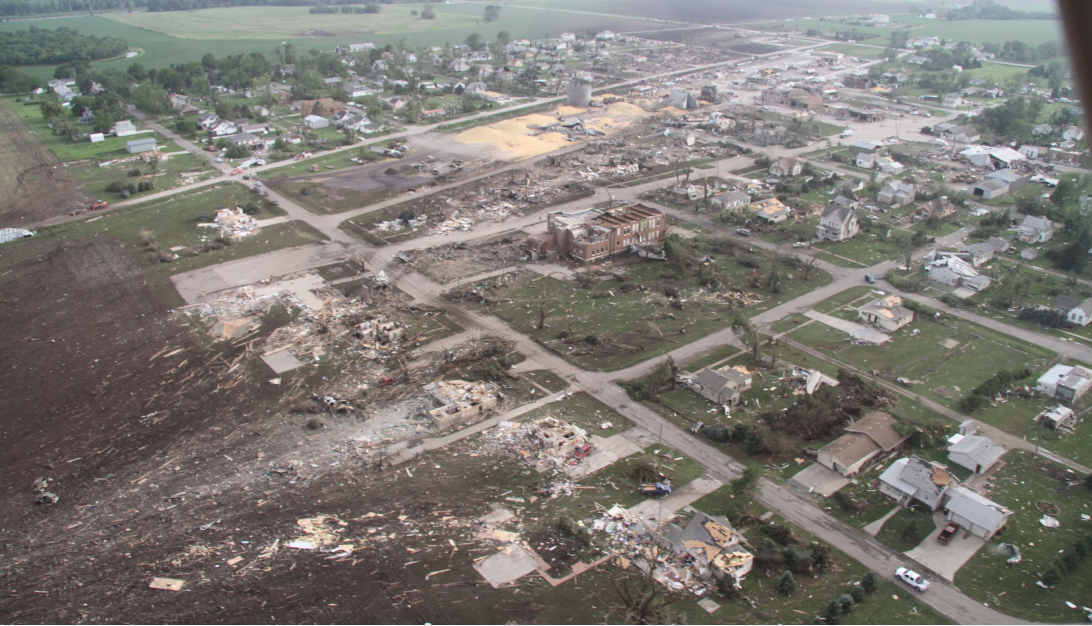
Aerial imagery of near high-end EF4 damages in Pilger

75% of Pilger was heavily damaged or destroyed by the tornado. Governor of Nebraska, Dave Heineman, declared a state of emergency for Pilger and the areas around the village and the National Guard came in to assist with emergency respondents, a shelter was opened up in Wisner-Pilger High School in Wisner. Governor Dave Heineman would later tour the village two days after the tornado. The village of Pilger was given $5.6 million in federal grant from Federal Emergency Management Agency (FEMA). American musician, Bret Michaels and his band drove to the village of Pilger on June 23, to assist with the clean up effort and help rebuild. United Way opened up funding for Pilger for relief efforts.

LCMS Disaster Response donated $110,000 to St. John and other churches affected by the tornado, a year after it was destroyed, the St John Lutheran Church was rebuilt. Matthew 25: Ministries went to the village of Pilger and the surrounding areas to help with tornado relief donating products like tarps, blankets, etc. All Hands and Hearts spent few weeks and they coordinated 2,943 volunteers to help remove debris. In total, 18,000 volunteers came to Pilger and Stanton County to help with relief and the volunteers stayed for a few days. The Salvation Army's Emergency Disaster Services mobilized their teams in Pilger to provide food, water, and spiritual support to victims of the twin tornadoes and first responders. Volunteers from Tyson Foods arrived in Pilger to serve more than 17,000 meals to survivors of the tornado and relief workers.

Pilger was getting a lot of help but other areas that got hit by the violent tornadoes like Cuming and Wayne counties didn't receive as much help with Wakefield only getting eight volunteers while Pilger received thousands of volunteers to help with the relief for the village, and the agricultural areas near Wakefield needs more volunteer to clean up the field from all the debris the tornado left.

Multiple damaged structures were bulldozed and construction projects were placed to rebuild; the bank that was destroyed in Pilger announced that it will rebuilt. After the tornado, the population of Pilger dropped from 352 people to 240.

== Case studies ==
=== Forward speed analysis ===
Storm chasers Hank Schyma (known online as Pecos Hank), Dr. Anton Seimon, Dr. Tracey Seimon, and Skip Talbot collaborated with a group of researchers to study the forward-moving speed of the Pilger tornado as it was roping out and interacting with the Wakefield tornado through a Fujiwara effect. Their findings suggested that the Pilger tornado achieved a record-setting forward motion of 94.6 mph (152.2 km/h). However, this forward ground speed has not been officially recognized by the National Weather Service.

=== Structural integrity research ===
A year later, civil engineering professors at the University of Nebraska–Lincoln conducted an analysis of the damage caused by the Pilger tornado. Their research focused on how structural defects can make infrastructure more susceptible to the intense wind speeds of high-end tornadoes. In their findings; several infrastructures, including the Wisner-Pilger Middle School, Midwest Bank, and Minnick Funeral Home, had unreinforced masonry, which are vulnerable to tornadic winds, with one of the surveyors, Richard Wood, commenting, “Though it’s very common here in the Midwest, unreinforced masonry does not hold up well to the lateral forces of a tornado. The masonry units are able to move independently and are very susceptible to collapse under lateral loads.” The town's grain bin suffered anchor and rivet failures that led to them being swept off their foundation, with one striking the southeast corner of the middle school.

=== Videographic observations ===
In 2022, researchers Lanny Dean, David Moran, and Randy Hicks published a study based on a scientific field campaign. This study involved capturing video observations of the main Pilger tornado before it struck the village. The footage revealed detailed insights into the tornado’s core wind field and uncovered previously undocumented phenomena, including the presence of multiple sub-vortices. As many as nine sub-vortices were observed, indicating a multi-vortex tornado. These sub-vortices were seen appearing and disappearing within seconds or milliseconds.

== See also ==
- March 1990 Central United States tornado outbreak - Another tornado family that produced twin F5 tornadoes in Kansas
- 2025 South Kansas tornado family – A similar event where a lone supercell produced a family of large and intense tornadoes
- Tornado outbreak of June 16–18, 2014
- List of F4 and EF4 tornadoes (2010–2019)
- Tornadoes of 2014
