= Crow Lake, South Dakota =

Unincorporated community in South Dakota, US

Coordinates: 43°57′27″N 98°44′20″W

Crow Lake is an unincorporated community in Jerauld County, South Dakota, United States. It lies at an elevation of 1,729 ft (527 m).
