= Altona, Nebraska =

Unincorporated community in Nebraska, United States

- Unincorporated Community
- Location within Nebraska Location within the United States
- Coordinates: 42°06′18″N 96°59′32″W
- Country: United States
- State: Nebraska
- County: Wayne
- Elevation: 1,532 ft (467 m)
- GNIS feature ID: 835228

Altona is an unincorporated community in Wayne County, Nebraska, United States.

== History ==
Altona was founded in 1898. It was named after Altona, in Germany. A post office was established at Altona in 1898, and remained in operation until it was discontinued in 1935.

== First Trinity Lutheran Church ==
Altona is also the home of First Trinity Lutheran Church, a congregation of the Lutheran Church-Missouri Synod. First Trinity was founded in 1881, and the congregation celebrated their 140th anniversary in 2021.
