= Hubbard, Nebraska =

Village in Dakota County, Nebraska, United States

- Village
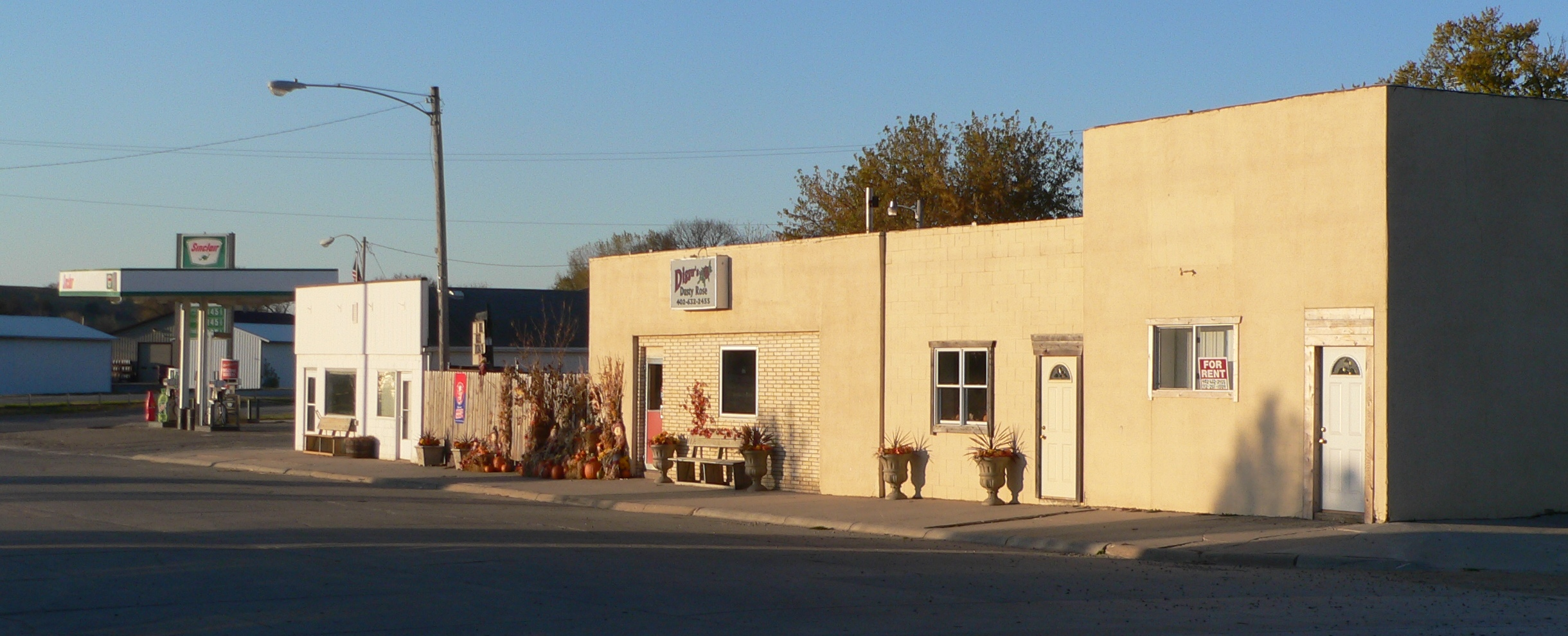
- Downtown Hubbard, October 2011

- Location of Hubbard, Nebraska
- Coordinates: 42°23′09″N 96°35′29″W
- Country: United States
- State: Nebraska
- County: Dakota

Area
  - Total: 0.17 sq mi (0.43 km^{2})
  - Land: 0.17 sq mi (0.43 km^{2})
  - Water: 0 sq mi (0.00 km^{2})
- Elevation: 1,165 ft (355 m)

Population (2020)
  - Total: 153
  - Density: 923.5/sq mi (356.55/km^{2})
- Time zone: UTC-6 (Central (CST))
  - Summer (DST): UTC-5 (CDT)
- ZIP code: 68741
- Area code: 402
- FIPS code: 31-23375
- GNIS feature ID: 2398552

Hubbard is a village in Dakota County, Nebraska, United States. It is part of the Sioux City, IA–NE–SD Metropolitan Statistical Area. As of the 2020 census, Hubbard had a population of 153.

== History ==
The Dakota City Land Company laid out Hubbard in 1880. The town was named after Judge Asahel W. Hubbard, president of the Covington, Columbus & Black Hills Railroad.

== Geography ==
According to the United States Census Bureau, the village has a total area of 0.17 square miles (0.44 km^{2}), all land.

== Demographics ==
Historical population
Census	Pop.	Note	%±
1900	90		—
1910	150		66.7%
1920	152		1.3%
1930	180		18.4%
1940	188		4.4%
1950	145		−22.9%
1960	138		−4.8%
1970	151		9.4%
1980	234		55.0%
1990	199		−15.0%
2000	234		17.6%
2010	236		0.9%
2020	153		−35.2%
U.S. Decennial Census

=== 2010 census ===
As of the census of 2010, there were 236 people, 80 households, and 62 families residing in the village. The population density was 1,388.2 inhabitants per square mile (536.0/km^{2}). There were 89 housing units at an average density of 523.5 per square mile (202.1/km^{2}). The racial makeup of the village was 91.5% White, 2.5% Pacific Islander, 5.5% from other races, and 0.4% from two or more races. Hispanic or Latino of any race were 5.5% of the population.

There were 80 households, of which 38.8% had children under the age of 18 living with them, 63.8% were married couples living together, 11.3% had a female householder with no husband present, 2.5% had a male householder with no wife present, and 22.5% were non-families. 16.3% of all households were made up of individuals, and 7.5% had someone living alone who was 65 years of age or older. The average household size was 2.95 and the average family size was 3.29.

The median age in the village was 35.8 years. 30.1% of residents were under the age of 18; 8.5% were between the ages of 18 and 24; 21.2% were from 25 to 44; 28.8% were from 45 to 64; and 11.4% were 65 years of age or older. The gender makeup of the village was 49.6% male and 50.4% female.

=== 2000 census ===
As of the census of 2000, there were 234 people, 83 households, and 56 families residing in the village. The population density was 1,325.9 inhabitants per square mile (511.9/km^{2}). There were 95 housing units at an average density of 538.3 per square mile (207.8/km^{2}). The racial makeup of the village was 98.72% White, and 1.28% from two or more races.

There were 83 households, out of which 39.8% had children under the age of 18 living with them, 55.4% were married couples living together, 9.6% had a female householder with no husband present, and 32.5% were non-families. 27.7% of all households were made up of individuals, and 10.8% had someone living alone who was 65 years of age or older. The average household size was 2.82 and the average family size was 3.52.

In the village, the population was spread out, with 32.5% under the age of 18, 12.0% from 18 to 24, 28.2% from 25 to 44, 15.4% from 45 to 64, and 12.0% who were 65 years of age or older. The median age was 29 years. For every 100 females, there were 116.7 males. For every 100 females age 18 and over, there were 107.9 males.

As of 2000 the median income for a household in the village was $40,938, and the median income for a family was $42,188. Males had a median income of $31,818 versus $20,625 for females. The per capita income for the village was $15,644. About 8.5% of families and 10.0% of the population were below the poverty line, including 5.7% of those under the age of eighteen and 10.0% of those 65 or over.

== See also ==
- List of municipalities in Nebraska
