= 2014 Louisville, Mississippi tornado =

EF4 tornado in Mississippi, US

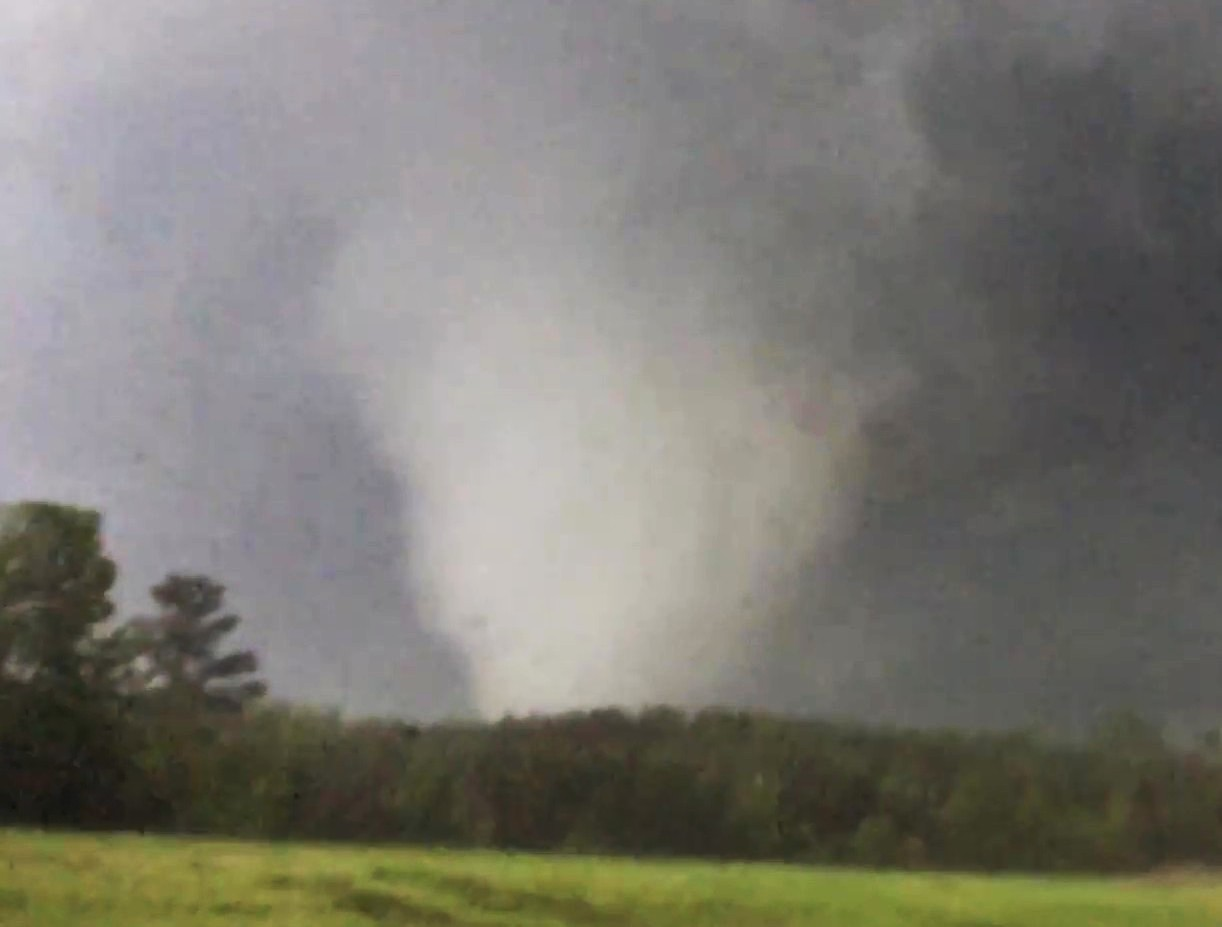
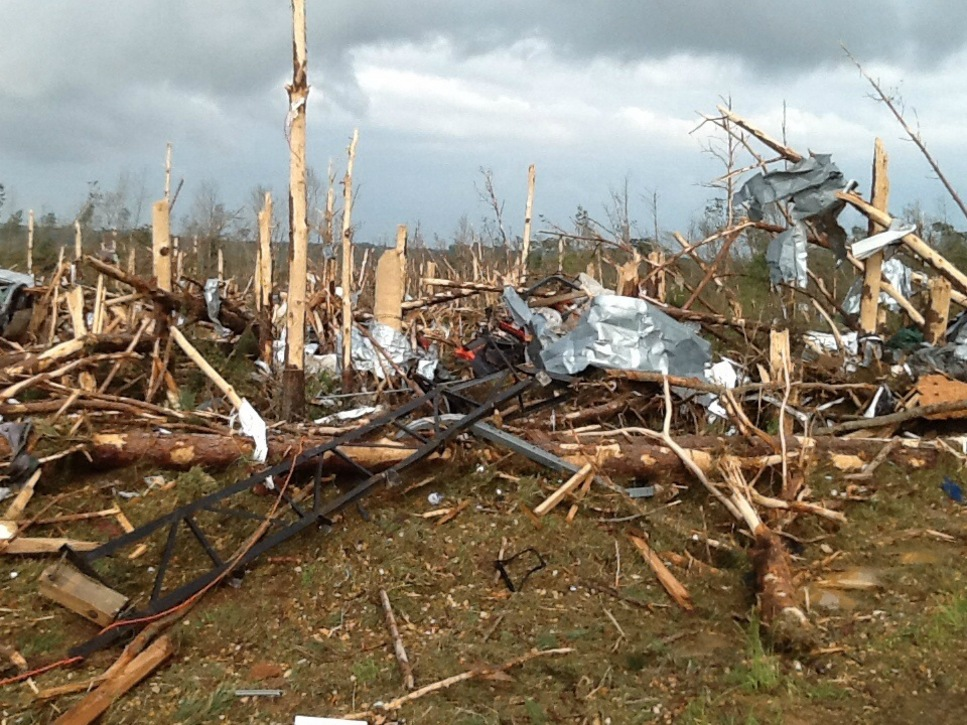
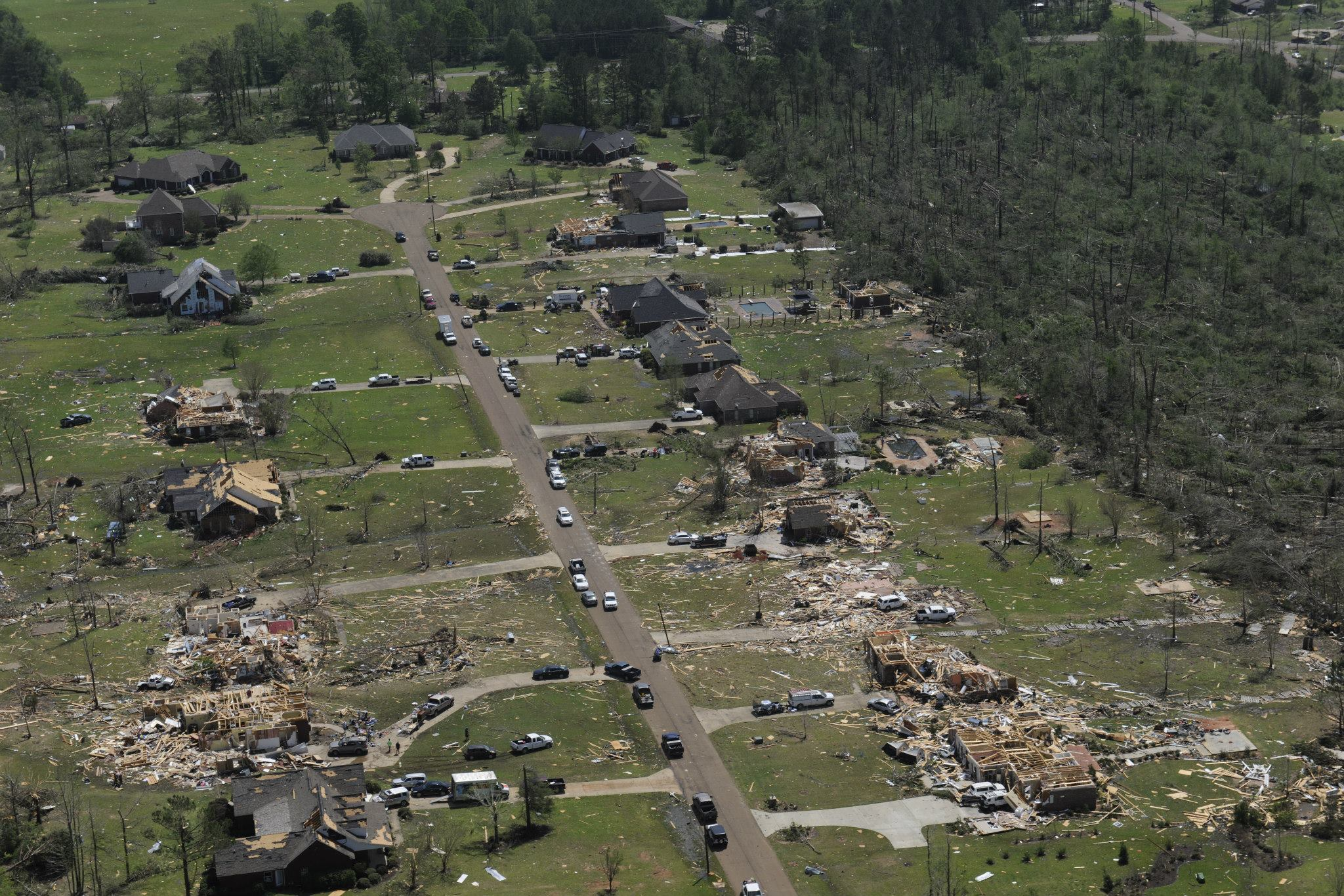
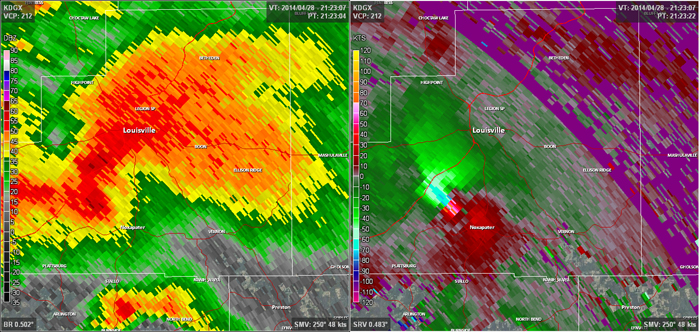
- Clockwise from top: Photo of the violent tornado before becoming rain-wrapped; aerial imagery of intense destruction in a neighborhood in Louisville; NEXRAD radar imagery of the tornado south of Louisville; extensive tree damage inflicted at low-end EF4 intensity.

Meteorological history
- Formed: April 28, 2014, 3:51 p.m. CDT (UTC–05:00)
- Dissipated: April 28, 2014, 4:47 p.m. CDT (UTC–05:00)
- Duration: 56 minutes

EF4 tornado
- on the Enhanced Fujita scale
- Max width: 1,320 yards (0.75 mi; 1.21 km)
- Path length: 34.38 miles (55.33 km)
- Highest winds: 185 mph (298 km/h)

Overall effects
- Fatalities: 10
- Injuries: 84
- Damage: $126 million (2014 USD)
- Areas affected: Leake County, Neshoba County, Winston County (particularly in Louisville)
- Part of the tornado outbreak and floods of April 27–30, 2014 and tornadoes of 2014

On the afternoon of Monday, April 28, 2014, a large, destructive, and deadly EF4 tornado caused major damage to Louisville, Mississippi and rural areas south of the town along its 34.38 miles (55.33 km) path. Killing ten people, injuring 84 people, and causing $126.05 million in damage, the tornado reached a peak width of 1,320 yd (1,210 m). The tornado was a part of a significant four-day tornado outbreak that spanned from April 27 to April 30 and was the second strongest tornado of the outbreak, reaching an estimated peak winds of 185 mph (298 km/h), the strongest being the violent and long-tracked EF4 tornado that tracked through central Arkansas the previous day.

The tornado touched down in northern Leake County, before quickly intensifying to high-end EF2 strength, damaging or destroying homes and snapping trees. The tornado intensified further to EF3 strength, destroying chicken farms, damaging homes, and snapping trees. The tornado became violent, shredding trees and destroying more metal buildings. The tornado continued to inflict significant to violent damage, damaging or destroying homes and metal building systems. The tornado weakened as it entered Louisville. The tornado intensified to low-end EF4 intensity, severely damaging several industrial buildings and destroying numerous homes. Along the remainder of its path, it destroyed an apartment complex, demolished several businesses, and caused extensive tree damage. The tornado dissipated northeast of Louisville.

Over 300 homes and businesses were destroyed, and hundreds were left homeless. Governor of Mississippi Phil Bryant issued a state of emergency before the tornado outbreak. President Barack Obama declared a major disaster for Mississippi after the severe weather event. Mississippi National Guardsmen were deployed to towns and communities affected by the tornado outbreak, including Louisville, and a temporary medical care facility was set up as the town's hospital was severely damaged. Several nonprofit organizations, including Samaritan's Purse, assisted in recovery efforts across multiple states, distributing meals and other essential supplies.

Afterwards, Louisville and other areas received federal grants to support rebuilding efforts, including a law Governor Bryant passed that gave millions to Louisville. Over the next few years, several destroyed businesses and homes were rebuilt, including the Winston Medical Center and a plywood manufacturing plant. Federal grants were allocated to the city and the county.

== Meteorological synopsis ==
=== Setup ===
On April 23, the Storm Prediction Center (SPC) issued a day 6 outlook for potential severe weather, with the SPC noting that a significant, multi-day severe weather event was expected from the central to southern plains to across Dixie Alley. Expectations were that a surface front and dryline should advance into the Mississippi Valley, where several supercells could evolve ahead of the front from Louisiana to as far east as central Tennessee, with tornadoes and large hail possible with the warm sector convection. On April 24, a deep surface cyclone was forecasted to move across easterly through the central plains, and curving frontal position should extend along the Kansas-Missouri border and into southern Texas. Severe thunderstorm development was expected across the warm sector, with winds of 80 kn (150 km/h; 92 mph) knots at the 500 mb (500 hPa) level ejecting across the lower Mississippi Valley into western Tennessee on Monday.

On April 26, a day three moderate risk was issued for a region extending from southwestern Kentucky to central Mississippi. A large, upper-level trough was expected to stall over the central United States, with mid-level speed max at 80 kn (150 km/h; 92 mph) ejecting into parts of the Mid-South and the convergence point of the Mississippi River and Ohio River by the afternoon of April 28. Dew points reaching into the 60 °F (16 °C) range was expected to be constant across the warm front extending from the Midwest to the Gulf Coast, persisting due to strong low-level shear. Strong diurnal heating was forecast in areas that lacked convective activity, supporting moderate buoyancy over the warm sector by the afternoon. Low to deep-layer shear was expected to be strong due to the mid-level speed max. The SPC noted that parts of the lower Mississippi Valley had a chance for high-end severe risk. Several storms were likely stemming from convective clusters along the dryline and convective outflow. With strong wind shear and surface dew points reaching into the 65–68 °F (18–20 °C) range, several supercells and significant tornadoes were likely, along with large hail and damaging winds.

=== Forecast ===
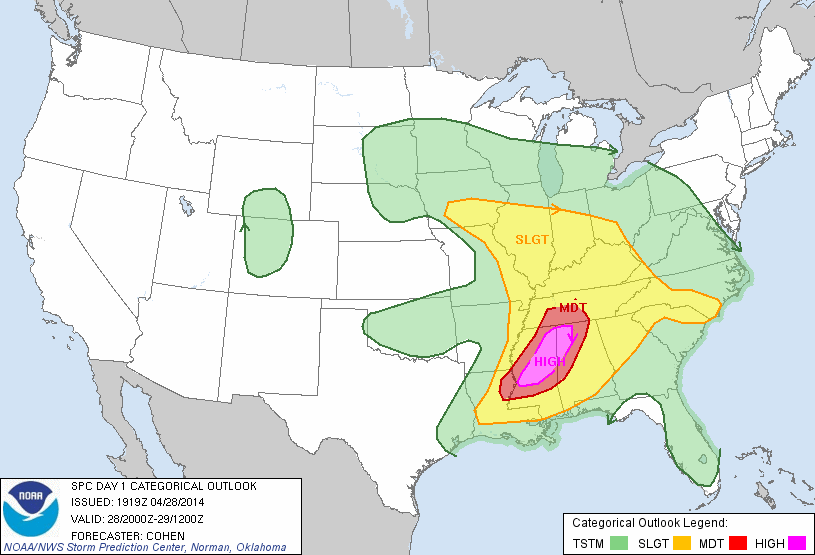
The National Weather Service Storm Prediction Center's Day 1 Convective Outlook for April 28, showing the Categorical Graphic

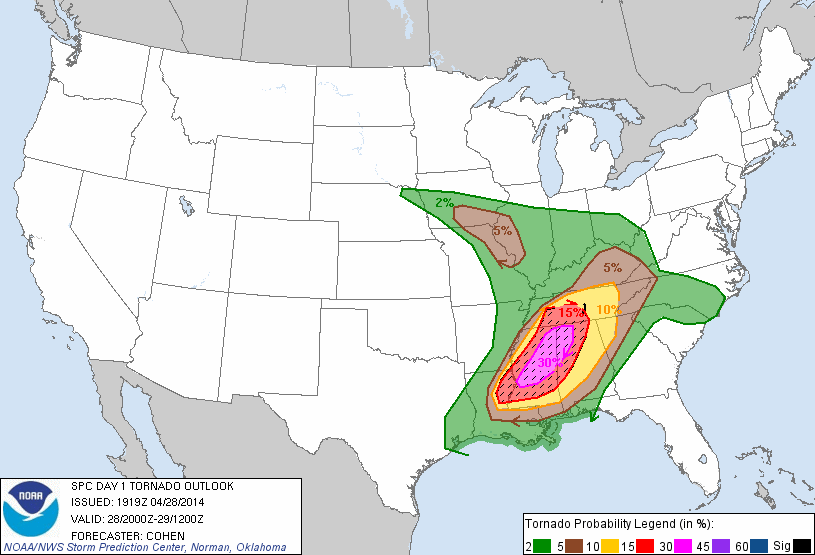
The probability of a tornado within 25 miles of a point (cross-hatched area: 10% or greater probability of EF2+ tornadoes)

On April 28, morning storms over Mississippi, Alabama, and Tennessee began dissipating, leaving a well-defined outflow boundary across south-central Tennessee and more diffuse across northern Mississippi and Alabama. The dissipating morning storms allowed strong surface heating to start across Louisiana and southwest Mississippi as further clearing occurred. By the afternoon, weakening convective inhibition allowed storms to develop along or east of the outflow boundary. Mid-level convective available potential energy (CAPE) was expected to be near 2,000 j/kg, with strong bulk shear of 50–60 kn (93–111 km/h; 58–69 mph), storm-relative helicity at 200-300 ms2/s2, and subtle forcing favored a discrete or cluster supercells mode. With all these variables, at 2:19 p.m. CDT, the SPC upgraded to a high risk for most of central Mississippi and parts of Alabama, with a 30% hatched risk for strong to violent tornadoes.

At 12:40 p.m. CDT, a particularly dangerous situation tornado watch was issued most of Mississippi, parts of Louisiana, Alabama, and southern Tennessee. Some long-lived supercells capable of strong, long-tracked tornadoes were expected. The tornado watch noted that surface based storm were beginning to develop in Louisiana and Mississippi as more clearing occurred and atmospheric destabilization continued; a combination of a moderate ML CAPE and strong deep vertical wind shear supported a broken band of supercells, with an increase in low-level shear expected across central Mississippi, northwest Alabama, and southern Tennessee along the outflow boundary.

By 3:49 p.m. CDT, numerous discrete and clustered supercells were moving northwest from central Mississippi into northwest Alabama, with the damaging Tupelo EF3 tornado already occurring within the past hour as more discrete supercells initiated south into central Mississippi, suggesting that these storms will more likely remain separated for a few more hours, increasing support for long-tracked and significant tornadoes. Local observations showed expected strengthening of the wind profiles and additional support from the low-level flow associated with surface pressure deepening, boosting storm relative helicity. Strong to violent tornado damage was expected over the next few hours with the most potent supercells.

== Tornado summary ==
=== Formation and initial damage ===
The tornado touched down north of Coosa in Leake County at 3:51 p.m. CDT, snapping and uprooting several softwood trees at mid-range EF1 intensity. The tornado intensified to high-end EF2 strength, with estimated windspeeds of 130 mph (210 km/h). A mobile home along McGee Town Road was destroyed, three vehicles were thrown and trees were downed. The tornado crossed Highway 25, maintaining high-end EF2 intensity. A metal building system experienced destruction. Two homes had majority of their roof ripped, another home nearby had parts of their roof torn off, numerous trees snapped and uprooted and an outbuilding nearby was demolished. The tornado crossed Highway 19, snapping several softwood trees and cause roof damage to a home.

At 3:58 p.m. CDT, the National Weather Service office in Jackson, Mississippi issued a radar-indicated particularly dangerous situation tornado warning for Attala, Neshoba, and Winston counties. The tornado weakened to high-end EF1 strength, traversing through rural areas of southern Winston County, snapping and uprooting several trees and overturning a motor home. At the same time, storm chasers reported that a large, multi-vortex tornado was on the ground. With the confirmation that a large and potentially violent tornado was on the ground, NWS upgraded the PDS tornado warning to a tornado emergency for the same aforementioned counties at 4:03 p.m. CDT. Then the tornado intensified slightly, snapping several softwood trees at EF2 intensity along Walter Sisson Road. The tornado turned northeast and crossed Goldman Road, quickly intensifying to mid-range EF3 strength.

=== Peak intensity track and through Louisville ===
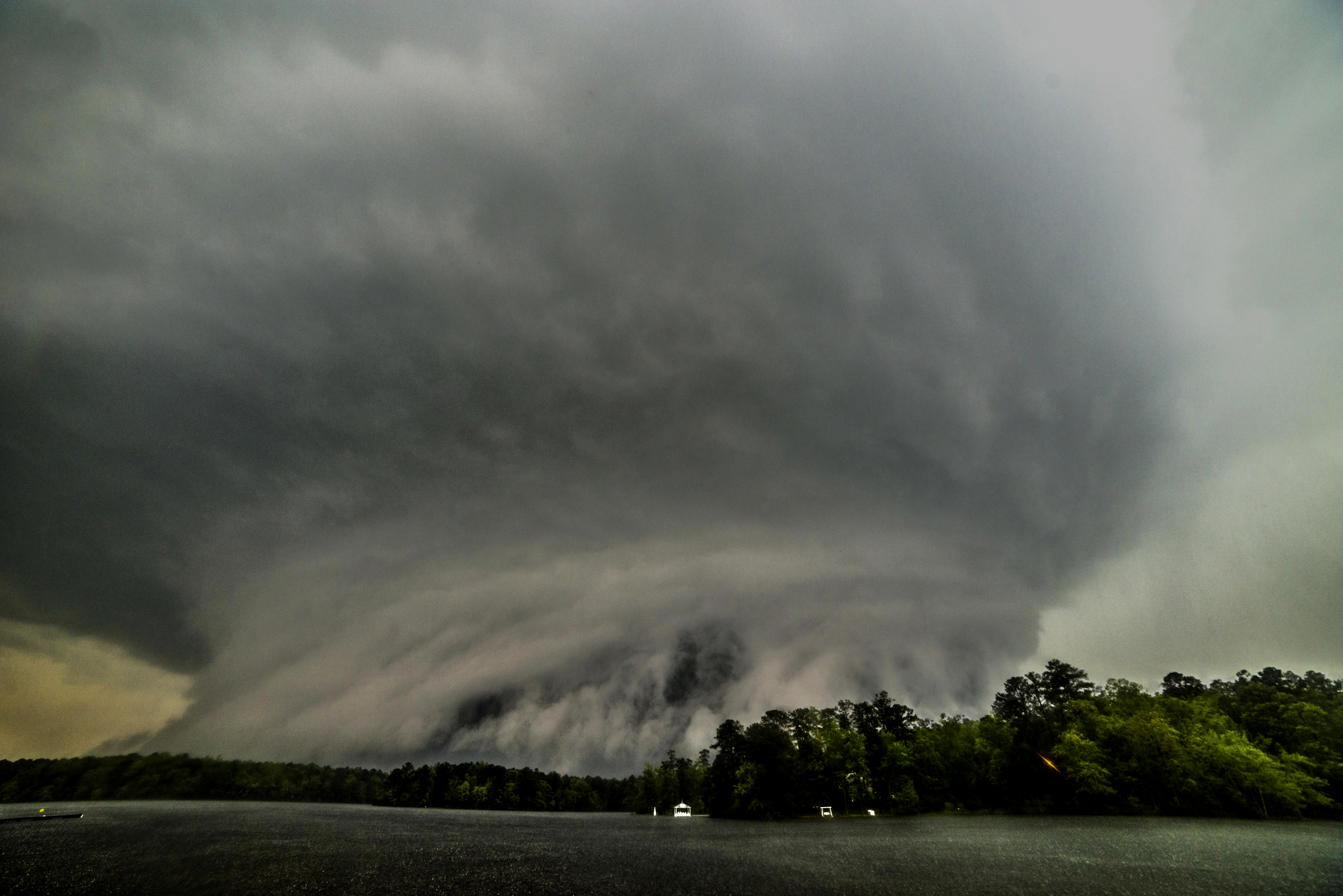
The parent supercell approaching Louisville as seen from Lake Tiak-O-Khata. (The tornado itself is not visible)

Numerous chicken houses were completely demolished, and a one-story brick home nearby was unroofed, with parts of the exterior walls collapsing; another nearby roof was ripped away and trees were knocked down. The tornado weakened slightly, crossing Plattsburg Road at low-end EF3 intensity. A large home was unroofed, and its exterior walls were torn down, with several other homes experiencing significant damage. The tornado then abruptly intensified to low-end EF4 strength for the first time as it crossed Hartness Road. Violent forestry damage was inflicted as numerous debarked trees were extensively debarked. Nearby, 12 metal chicken homes were flattened and swept clean off their foundations, and another chicken home was destroyed. The tornado weakened to high-end EF2 intensity, completely ripping away a roof off a home, a double-wide mobile home was destroyed, and several trees and power poles were snapped and toppled over.

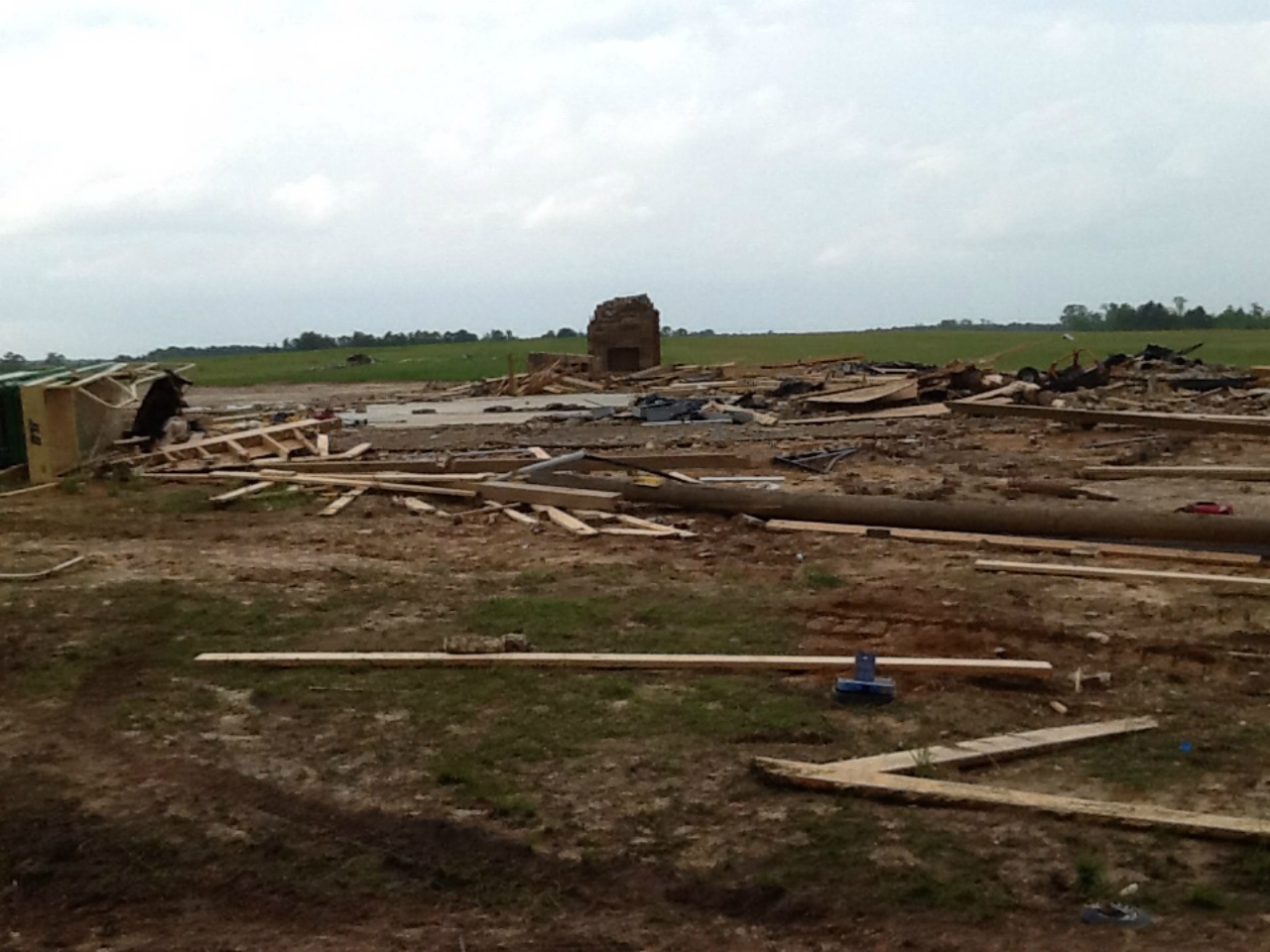
A brick home swept away at mid-range EF4 intensity.

The tornado strengthened again to low-end EF4 strength, destroying several more chicken houses at wind speeds of 170 mph (270 km/h) and significantly snapping nearby trees. A guide cell tower nearby was crumpled, with the damage indicator being rated mid-range EF3, though surveyors noted that winds may have been higher. Then, the tornado impacted a small row of homes along Stanley Road, intensifying to a peak strength of 185 mph (298 km/h). A brick home was flattened and blown away, leaving the chimney standing. Another well-constructed brick home nearby was demolished and swept clean, with heavy tree damage nearby. Several softwood trees near the peak damage indicator were shredded and heavily debarked, a double-wide mobile home was destroyed, and more trees were snapped. The tornado weakened to low-end EF3 intensity, flattening a chicken house, with trees and power poles nearby snapping.

The tornado weakened to high-end EF2 intensity as the tornado turned more northerly. Crossing Young Crossing Road, several mobile homes were demolished, a few framed homes were extensively unroofed, and several softwood trees were snapped. After weakening slightly, the tornado intensified to high-end EF2 strength; a home along Emepa Road had large sections of its roof ripped away. The tornado then struck a neighborhood near Highway 15 at high-end EF3 intensity. Several homes experienced heavy destruction, with a few of them leveled and swept away. The tornado intensified further to low-end EF4 strength, impacting the Taylor Machine Works and destroying parts of the building. The tornado maintained low-end EF4 intensity as it impacted the Winston Plywood & Veneer plant, leveling two metal industrial buildings and destroying the plywood mill on site. Then the tornado impacts a neighborhood along Eiland Avenue, inflicting major destruction to this subdivision at high-end EF3 intensity. Several homes were heavily damaged or destroyed, multiple cars were tossed into pile ups, and an industrial building was destroyed, two fatalities occurred in this area; a 64-year-old woman was killed here after saving her grandson as their home was swept away, and 61-year-old man was found injured, but later died to his injuries at the University of Mississippi Medical Center (UMMC).

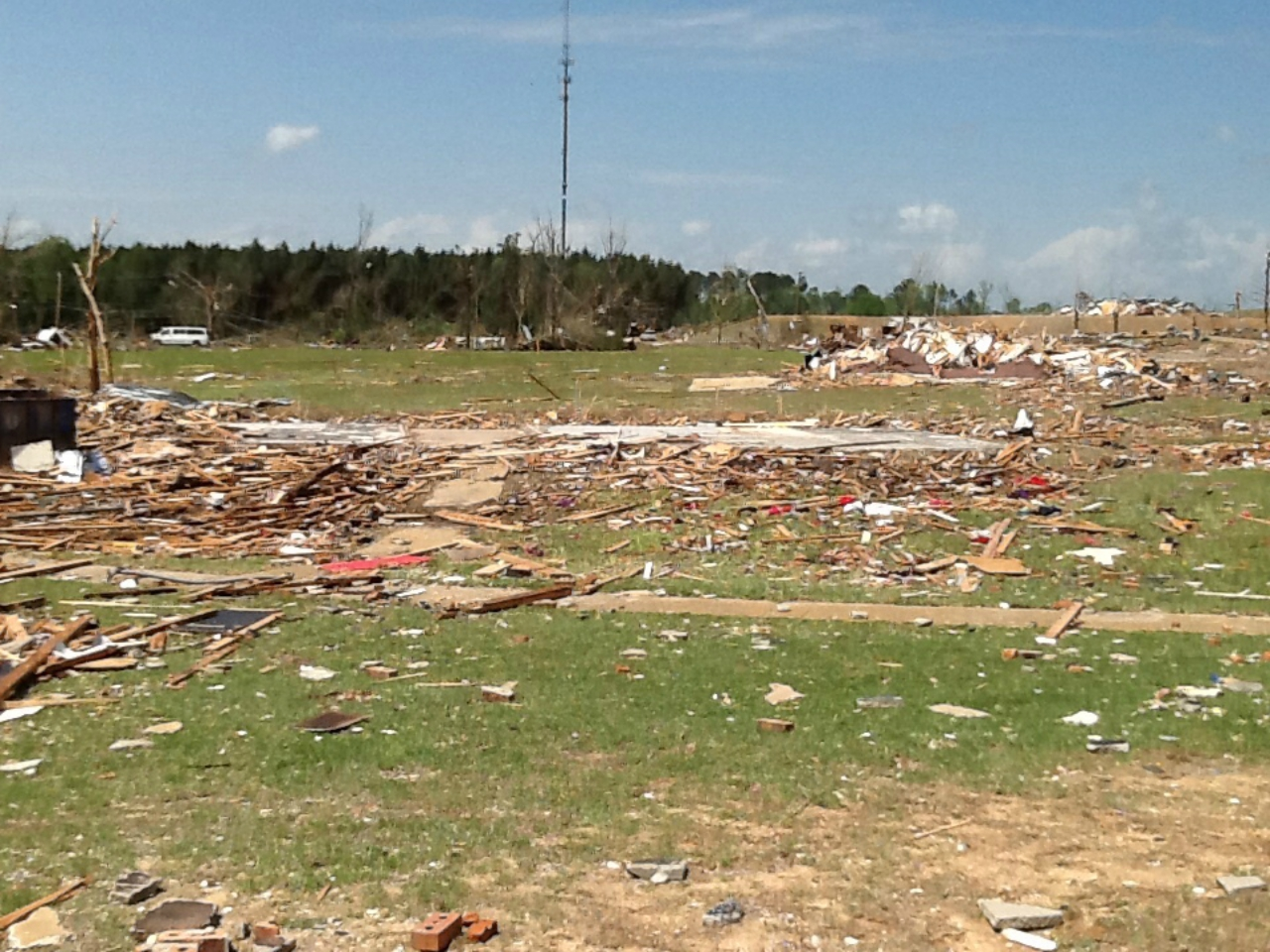
Two apartment buildings swept away at low-end EF4 intensity.

The Eiland Plaza Apartments were heavily impacted by the tornado as it struck at estimated windspeeds of 175 mph (282 km/h). Several apartment buildings were heavily damaged or completely flattened, with two buildings in particular being swept clean off their foundations, two fatalities occurred in the apartment complexes. Nearby, the Calvary Apostolic Church was leveled by the tornado, with the church's fellowship hall and clinic being destroyed as well. The Mount Bethel Olive Harmony Branch Association building was destroyed at high-end EF3 strength, with the entire metal building being completely flattened. The Louisville Memorial Park took a direct hit from the tornado. Headstones in the cemetery were shifted or completely shattered as the tornado continued off northeast. The tornado maintained high-end EF3 intensity, impacting a row of homes along Cox Road. A well-constructed brick home was leveled and swept away at 165 mph (266 km/h), a double-wide mobile home was demolished, with the frame wrapped around a tree, multiple softwood trees were debarked and denubbed severely, and several other homes were heavily damaged, with some losing their exterior walls, and power poles were snapped.

The Winston Medical Center was severely impacted by the tornado as it struck at low-end EF3 intensity. Multiple walls of the hospital were knocked down or damaged, facade components of the structure were torn off, and a gas leak occurred as a result of the damage inflicted by the tornado. Around the hospital, cars were flipped and thrown, power poles were snapped, and numerous trees were snapped. 125 patients, visitors, and staff were in hospital rooms when the tornado struck; though the hospital reported no deaths, a few people were injured. The tornado maintained intensity, crossing the road and hitting another row of homes and businesses at low-end EF3 intensity. An automobile showroom and a nearby building were also destroyed. Nearby, a daycare center was completely swept off its foundation; the owner, a 53-year-old woman, was killed as she protected a 4-year-old girl from the tornado as it struck the building. Continuing afterwards, the tornado struck a home along McCullough Road, tearing away the roof and knocking down walls at low-end EF3 intensity. The tornado then leveled two poorly constructed brick and wooden framed homes further north and snapped numerous trees nearby the destroyed structures, with estimated windspeeds of 145 mph (233 km/h).

=== Weakening and dissipation ===
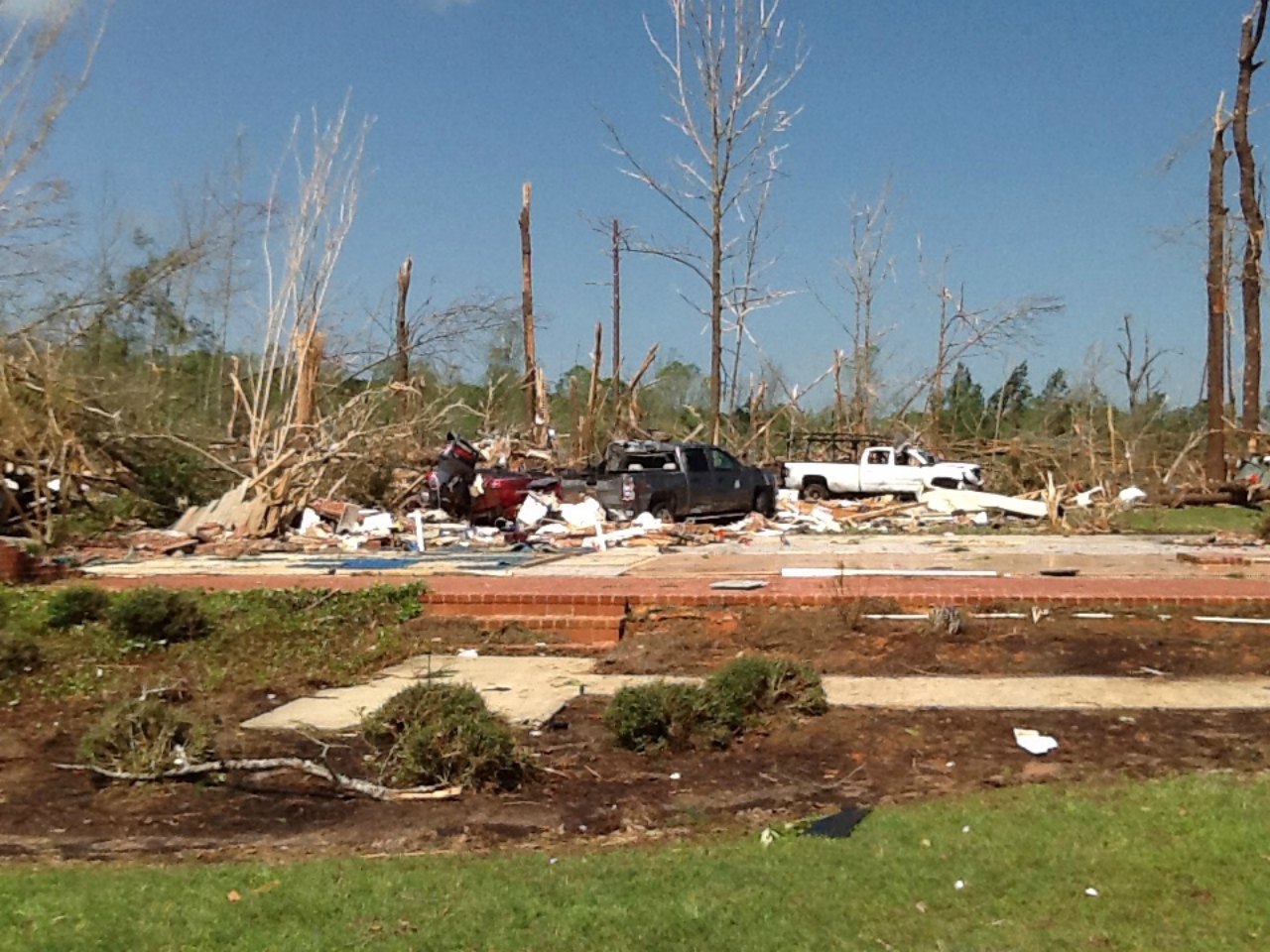
A poorly-constructed home completely swept away at high-end EF3 intensity.

Along the road, a large, well-built brick home was heavily damaged by the tornado, with parts of the roof ripped away. Several other homes nearby also experienced significant damage. Another brick-framed home was also heavily damaged, with other homes also damaged, and numerous trees were snapped, with some of them being debarked. Then the tornado struck a row of homes at high-end EF3 intensity, with estimated wind speeds of 165 mph (266 km/h). A home was swept clean off its foundation, and several nearby trees were heavily damaged, with some debarked. Two other brick homes were also heavily destroyed, leaving only a few interior walls, and several trees were snapped and uprooted, with one uprooted tree being thrown 50 yd (50 m) away. The tornado weakened slightly, striking a line of homes along Richardson Road at wind speeds of 150 mph (240 km/h). Several homes were heavily damaged, with a few having parts of their interior walls left; a shed was destroyed, and trees were snapped. Then the tornado struck a neighborhood along Wood Street, inflicting heavy damage to several homes. Multiple homes were heavily damaged or destroyed, trees were splintered, and debris was strewn across the ground.

At the intersection of Brooksville and McCullough Roads, the tornado intensified to low-end EF4 strength. Two large homes were almost destroyed, leaving some walls standing. Several other homes were heavily damaged, with some leveled or swept away, and numerous hardwood trees and power poles were snapped. The tornado weakened slightly to high-end EF3, leveling a well-built home. Another home was heavily damaged, with its roof being torn off and parts of the exterior walls collapsing, and numerous trees were snapped. The tornado lifted at 4:47 p.m. CDT a few miles north-northeast of Louisville as a separate cell from the south began interacting and merging with the tornado's parent supercell, leading to the tornado's dissipation. The tornado was on the ground for 56 minutes, traveling 34.38 miles (55.33 km) and reaching a peak width of 1,320 yd (1,210 m). A whole door was thrown 30 miles (50 km) away from Louisville onto the Mississippi State University campus in Starkville.

== Impacts and aftermath ==
In Leake County, the tornado inflicted $1.2 million in property damage, $2.2 million in vegetation damage, and three injuries. In Neshoba County, the tornado inflicted $400,000 in property damage and $750,000 in vegetation damage. In Winston County, $115 million in property damage occurred, along with $6.5 million in vegetation damage; ten people were killed, and 81 were injured. In Winston County, 391 structures were destroyed, and hundreds were left homeless. The Winston County Economic Development Partnership reported more than 100 people were living in shelters, others were staying with relatives. There were 40 homes for sale in the county before the tornado occurred, and the town was already in "critical shortage" of rental options, according to the executive director.

The Mississippi Forestry Commission used aerial flights to conduct a storm damage assessment of the forestry damage caused by tornadoes from the April 28 outbreak. About 31,854 acres (12,891 ha) of forestry across Mississippi were affected by the tornado outbreak, resulting in $14.3 million in timber damage. In Winston County, 9,777 acres (3,957 ha) of pine, hardwood, and mixed trees were damaged, resulting in $6.5 million in timber damage. In Private Non-Industrial Landowners areas, an additional 8,205 acres (3,320 ha) of trees were damaged, totaling about $5.5 million in losses. The survey noted that these forested areas are unlikely to recover fully as other factors, including insects, diseases, and other stressors, cause further timber damage.

=== Response ===
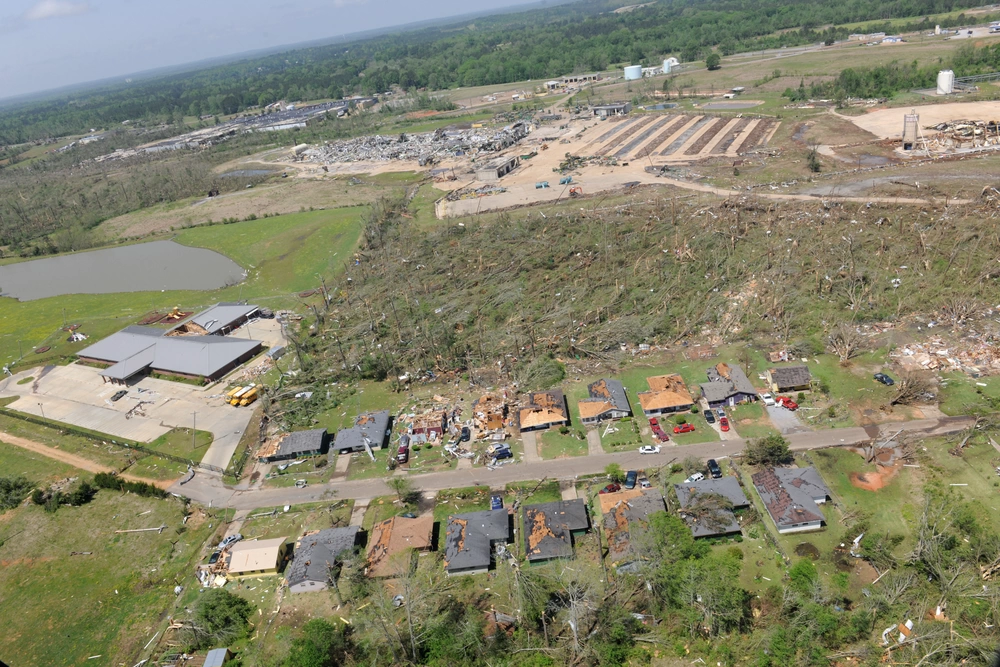
Aerial imagery of the Eiland Avenue neighborhood and the industrial park after the tornado the day after.

Governor Phil Bryant declared a state of emergency for Mississippi before the tornado outbreak, allowing state officials to station and deploy resources to affected areas. The State Emergency Operations Center was partially activated by critical personnel. The Mississippi National Guard units were deployed to several towns and communities that were impacted by tornadoes from the tornado outbreak, including Louisville. National Guardsmen aided in the search and rescue efforts for missing victims. The National Guard also patrolled areas hardest hit by the tornadoes, along with setting up checkpoints and security. National Guardsmen and the Mississippi Emergency Management Agency were stationed at Hawkins Field in Jackson, Mississippi, where medical evacuations and damage assessment occurred. On April 29, Governor Bryant ordered the deployment of an extra 50 National Guardsmen for Tupelo and Louisville, raising the total of Guardsmen assisting in the disaster areas to 100. Mississippi state emergency officials drove in a mobile emergency room to replace the damaged medical center in Louisville to treat injuries.

On April 30, President Barack Obama declared a major disaster for Mississippi and ordered federal aid to the state and local recovery efforts in the area affected by severe weather and flooding. Federal funding became available for people affected in Itawamba, Lee, Madison, Rankin, Wayne, and Winston counties. On May 6, a temporary care facility from North Carolina was set up two miles away from the Winston Medical Center along Church Street, supported by Federal Emergency Management Agency (FEMA). The mobile hospital had ten beds, a five-bed emergency department, an X-ray unit, and full surgical capabilities. It was connected to the site's essentials like electricity, water, and sewer. The temporary hospital served patients in Louisville until Winston Medical Center was rebuilt.

The City of Louisville set up a distribution center to give emergency supplies to tornado victims. The Samaritan's Purse sent out a disaster relief unit and a Billy Graham Evangelistic Association truck to the area to help with victims. On May 6, Phil Bryant's wife, Deborah Bryant, partnered with Samaritan's Purse to volunteer in the recovery efforts, aiding in clearing out debris from residential structures. The Salvation Army sent out 18 mobile feeding units across Mississippi and Alabama, delivering food and supplies to several locations. In Louisville, two additional mobile feeding units were sent out to the area for support. The global non-profit organization, AmeriCares, funded the temporary facility for the Winston County Medical Center that would help keep it in operation during the rebuilding process. The Chief Executive Officer of Greater Meridian Health Clinic stated that patients would drove up to 30 miles (48 km) to receive care without the help from AmeriCares as the clinic was destroyed by the tornado.

UMMC in Jackson, Mississippi, sent emergency responders, care providers, and medical equipment to help attend to victims. Med-Com, UMMC-based medical communications hub for Mississippi, began supporting local emergency management services and hospital providers by coordinating ambulances to transport patients to the hospital. Med-Com also relayed damage reports and real-time information to agencies like Mississippi State Department of Health and MEMA. With the likelihood of serious injuries, the Chief Executive Officer and other leaders activated UMMC's Emergency Operations Plan, which allowed adult and pediatric trauma rooms, Emergency Department capacity, and operating rooms to be sent over. The Forward Assessment and Scene Triage (FAST) Team, a team of three, traveled to Louisville to assist local emergency responders and health-care workers in classifying victims and clearing the damaged hospital.

== Recovery ==
On May 12, the Mississippi Legislature met in a three-hour session to approve $17 million to help pay for recovery from disasters, including the tornado outbreak. Governor Bryant signed the funding measure, Senate Bill 2001, into law. Governor Bryant originally requested lawmakers $20 million of funding, but officials stated $17 million was enough to cover costs until January, when the Legislature begins its 2015 session. The Norman Regional Health System in Oklahoma donated $48,000 to the Winston County Medical Center, with the president and CEO of the Norman Regional Health stating that the company wanted to help employees that were impacted by the tornado. The donation was divided among the employees, according to the CEO of the Winston Medical Center. The city of Louisville received a $10 million insurance check to cover the destruction of the plywood facility, with officials clarifying that the $10 million only covers the cost of real estate. Money has not yet been recovered for the loss of equipment due to the storm. The plywood company leased the building from the city.

In September, Winston County Medical Foundation received a $1.09 million grant from FEMA. On October 23, Republican Senator Roger Wicker and Thad Cochran, along with Representative Alan Nunnelee approved $43.5 million in federal grants to help rebuild areas damaged by the tornado in Louisville and Winston County, with $34.5 million directed to the rebuilding of the plywood manufacturing plant. That award reimbursed 75% of the cost to rebuild the plywood plant. FEMA told lawmakers it approved four FEMA Public Assistance grants to offset recovery costs. Three other grants totaling $10.8 million were linked to restoring medical care services to Winston County. Winston County was awarded a $9.7 million grant, removing two county-owned warehouses, including one replaced to accommodate a mobile disaster hospital. MEMA received $1 million to redirect costs for emergency protective measures to restore medical care services, with Mississippi State Department of Health and other medical services organizations coordinating the effort.

On December 1, 2015, Senators Roger Wicker and Thad Cochran announced an additional $1.78 million federal grant to continue to support the restoration of health care facilities in Louisville and Winston County. The FEMA public assistance grant to the Winston County Medical Foundation was expected to continue supporting the replacement of four buildings and fund other repairs at the Winston County Medical Complex. The grant represented a 75% share of the total cost of the recovery effort in Winston County during this phase, which was $2.38 million.

On September 29, 2016, an investigation conducted by the Office of Inspector General discovered that the city, despite following the federal regulations and guidelines by FEMA when accounting for federal funding, failed to follow the federal procurement standards in granting 12 contracts, totaling $23.9 million. The investigation also reported that the city failed to take the necessary steps to use disadvantaged firms, not providing full and open competition for a project management contract totaling $600,000. Louisville reported receiving funding from other federal sources, but FEMA had not reduced eligible costs to $1.5 million, resulting in duplication of benefits. The report recommend FEMA to dismiss $25.4 million in ineligible costs and direct the state of Mississippi to provide additional technical aid and monitoring to Louisville. After the report, Mayor of Louisville, Will Hill, stated that the city didn't own any money to FEMA during a meeting. The audit identified mistakes the city made but did not warrant a reduction in obligations for contracts. The city was $11 million under budget in recovery, accord.

For 11 months after the tornado, the hospital operated from tent units. Then in April 2015, it transferred to a transitional facility consisting of modular trailers. At the same time, because of the heavy damage sustained, demolition of the old Winston Medical Center building began. This was July 2015, a year after the tornado, and the demolition project was completed in 90 days. The design and construction of the new replacement facility was estimated to cost $55 million. On April 28, 2017, three years after the tornado, the new facility opened to the public, with over 1,000 people attending the ribbon-cutting ceremony. The new facility covers all the services from the previous building, including inpatient, outpatient, radiology, laboratory, geri-psychiatric, respiratory, pharmacy, emergency department, and swing bed services. The nursing home units were also rebuilt after being heavily damaged by the tornado.

In response to the tornado, the construction of the Louisville Community Safe Room began and finished in 2019, with building costs reaching $3.1 million. The Safe Room is a FEMA P-361 and International Code Council (ICC)-500 rated storm shelter that can shelter up to 2,218 people during severe weather; the monolithic dome also serves as a community center for Louisville. The entire structure was 12,670 square feet, with a single, large room and restrooms and storage on one side. All doors are storm-rated and open during tornado warnings.

== See also ==
- List of F4 and EF4 tornadoes (2010–2019)
- Weather of 2014
