= Welti, Alabama =

Unincorporated community in Alabama, United States

Welti
- Unincorporated community
- Welti's position in Alabama.
- Coordinates: 34°08′21″N 86°44′20″W
- Country: United States
- State: Alabama
- County: Cullman
- Elevation: 718 ft (219 m)
- Time zone: UTC-6 (Central (CST))
  - Summer (DST): UTC-5 (CDT)
- GNIS feature ID: 153923

Welti is an unincorporated community in Cullman County, Alabama, United States. Welti was damaged during the April 2014 tornado outbreak. Welti was formerly home to the Welti Road Covered Bridge, until it was burned down on October 22, 1939. Welti Falls, a waterfall created from the spillway of Forest Ingram Lake, is located near Welti.
