= List of tornadoes in the outbreak and floods of April 27–30, 2014 =

In late April 2014, a tornado outbreak in the central and southern United States produced multiple long-track tornadoes – at least seven were deadly, causing over 35 fatalities. One additional death occurred in Florida, due to severe flooding associated with this system.

== Confirmed tornadoes ==
Daily statistics
Date	Total	EF0	EF1	EF2	EF3	EF4	EF5	Deaths	Injuries
April 27	16	8	4	3	0	1	0	19	231
April 28	48	5	25	10	7	1	0	16	201
April 29	16	5	6	3	2	0	0	0	15
April 30	2	0	2	0	0	0	0	0	0
Total	82	18	37	16	9	2	0	35	447

=== April 27 event ===
List of confirmed tornadoes – Sunday, April 27, 2014 (Note: All dates are based on the local time zone where the tornado touched down; however, all times are in Coordinated Universal Time for consistency.)
EF#	Location	County / Parish	State	Start Coord.	Time (UTC)	Path length	Max width	Damage (Note: All damage totals are in 2014 USD unless otherwise stated.)	Summary
EF0	Odessa	Lafayette	MO	38.9934°N 93.9689°W	1751–1756	2.38 mi (3.83 km)	50 yd (46 m)	Unknown	A short-lived tornado touched down in Odessa and caused minor damage to homes and businesses, especially in western parts of the town. A tractor trailer was overturned by the storm along I-70 before it dissipated.
EF0	NNE of Upland	Franklin	NE	40.3448°N 98.885°W	1926–1929	0.14 mi (0.23 km)	35 yd (32 m)	$0	No damage was reported.
EF1	E of Highland Center to S of Oxford	Wapello, Keokuk, Iowa, Johnson	IA	41.1325°N 92.3117°W	2020–2106	45.98 mi (74.00 km)	1,600 yd (1,500 m)	$25,000	2 deaths – The tornado touched down in northern Wapello County, where a chicken barn was destroyed and utility poles were either snapped or found leaning. Through Keokuk, Iowa, and Johnson counties, numerous outbuildings were either damaged or destroyed, with the two fatalities (one west of Martinsburg and one north of Kinross) being associated with destroyed outbuildings. Also, a mobile home was pushed off of its foundation in Martinsburg and numerous trees and power poles were downed along the path. Thereafter it moved into Iowa County and later Johnson County where it traversed mainly rural areas. Damage in these areas was limited predominantly to trees and outbuildings.
EF0	N of Bradshaw	York	NE	41.6117°N 91.8329°W	2140–2141	0.07 mi (0.11 km)	45 yd (41 m)	$0	A brief tornado was observed by storm chasers; no damage resulted from the event.
EF0	S of Springville	Linn	IA	41.9625°N 91.3819°W	2140	0.5 mi (0.80 km)	50 yd (46 m)	$0	A brief tornado was observed by storm chasers; power to traffic lights was knocked out by the storm. The tornado was generated by the same storm that produced the 2020–2106 UTC EF1 tornado.
EF0	NNW of Swedehome	Polk	NE	41.2007°N 97.7065°W	2217–2218	0.4 mi (0.64 km)	45 yd (41 m)	$0	A brief tornado was observed by storm chasers; no damage resulted from the event.
EF2	Quapaw, OK to Baxter Springs, KS	Ottawa (OK), Cherokee (KS)	OK, KS	36.912°N 94.8215°W	2229–2242	11.37 mi (18.30 km)	325 yd (297 m)	$13,000,000	1 death – See section on this tornado – An additional 37 people were injured.
EF1	N of Octavia	Le Flore	OK	34.548°N 94.7109°W	2231–2234	1.5 mi (2.4 km)	250 yd (230 m)	$0	Many trees were downed along US 259. Surveyors were unable to access areas where the tornado likely touched down and dissipated and these portions of the track were estimated by NEXRAD Doppler weather radar.
EF2	N of Fort Scott to E of Pleasanton	Bourbon, Linn	KS	37.9269°N 94.7125°W	2240–2306	16.13 mi (25.96 km)	400 yd (370 m)	$500,000	The tornado touched down near Hammond, tossing grain bins and destroying several outbuildings before moving north-northeastward into Linn County. There, the tornado strengthened and destroyed an outdoor garage containing heavy equipment, nearly removing it from its foundation. An empty semi trailer was tossed over 200 yd (180 m) into a grove of trees and other vehicles were tossed around as well. It then destroyed a church that was built in the 1880s before dissipating in an open field. Numerous trees were downed along the path.
EF0	WSW of Milo	Vernon	MO	37.7302°N 94.3995°W	2315–2316	0.34 mi (550 m)	100 yd (91 m)	$0	A brief tornado touched down in a forested area and caused some damage to trees; inaccessibility prevented surveyors from directly assessing the event.
EF4	W of Ferndale to Mayflower/Vilonia to N of El Paso	Pulaski, Faulkner, White	AR	34.7787°N 92.652°W	0006–0102	41.1 mi (66.1 km)	1,320 yd (1,210 m)	$223,450,000	16 deaths – See article on this tornado – 193 people were injured.
EF2	SE of Joy to Center Hill to SSE of Mount Pisgah	White	AR	35.2491°N 91.9215°W	0116–0125	7.32 mi (11.78 km)	880 yd (800 m)	$1,400,000	Two manufactured homes, two barns, and a tractor shed were destroyed, a site-built home had its exterior walls collapsed, and a metal barn was leaned over. A site-built home and a few mobile homes sustained roof damage, and hundreds of trees were downed as well. One person was injured.
EF0	Steprock	White	AR	35.4236°N 91.674°W	0138–0140	1.64 mi (2.64 km)	250 yd (230 m)	$100,000	A brief tornado downed numerous trees, resulting in damage five homes.
EF1	NNW of Bare Stone to N of Denmark	White, Jackson	AR	35.4639°N 91.6414°W	0143–0149	5.28 mi (8.50 km)	100 yd (91 m)	$110,000	A farm building was destroyed, a home was damaged, and several trees were downed.
EF1	WNW of Union Hill	Independence	AR	35.5439°N 91.5524°W	0152–0153	0.84 mi (1.35 km)	50 yd (46 m)	$20,000	A brief tornado downed trees and power lines.
EF0	SW of Goodhope	Douglas	MO	36.91°N 92.81°W	0445–0450	0.88 mi (1.42 km)	100 yd (91 m)	$10,000	Several outbuildings were damaged and many trees were downed.

=== April 28 event ===
List of confirmed tornadoes – Monday, April 28, 2014
EF#	Location	County / Parish	State	Start Coord.	Time (UTC)	Path length	Max width	Damage	Summary
EF2	Hosston to W of Plain Dealing	Caddo, Bossier	LA	32.8866°N 93.875°W	0809–0815	5.06 mi (8.14 km)	550 yd (500 m)	$1,020,000	A strong tornado caused minor damage to a house in Hosston before moving east. Another home sustained major roof damage, while a third was shifted off of its foundation. Numerous trees were snapped and uprooted along the path.
EF0	NE of Millington	Shelby	TN	35.3615°N 89.7486°W	1146–1148	1.54 mi (2.48 km)	75 yd (69 m)	$25,000	A short-lived tornado caused roof damage to homes and downed trees.
EF1	E of Sparta	White	TN	35.8808°N 85.2931°W	1737–1738	2.05 mi (3.30 km)	100 yd (91 m)	$30,000	Dozens of trees were snapped, and an occupied vehicle was thrown from a road. Several homes suffered minor damage and a grain silo was completely destroyed.
EF0	SE of Holy Bluff	Yazoo	MS	32.7526°N 90.6067°W	1857–1858	0.24 mi (0.39 km)	50 yd (46 m)	$0	A brief touchdown in an open field was reported by storm chasers.
EF3	SW of Tupelo to Bay Springs Lake	Lee, Itawamba, Prentiss	MS	34.2261°N 88.8242°W	1938–2020	30.97 mi (49.84 km)	440 yd (400 m)	$18,010,000	1 death – A large, multiple vortex wedge tornado moved through Tupelo, heavily damaging or destroying numerous homes and businesses. A four-story hotel sustained major damage, along with Joyner Elementary School and a maintenance shop. Extensive tree and power line damage occurred, and vehicles were flipped as well. 84 homes were destroyed in the Tupelo area, while 169 homes suffered major damage, and 351 other homes had minor damage. Six mobile homes were destroyed, nine mobile homes had major damage, while 6 others had minor damage. 17 businesses were destroyed, and 9 others suffered major damage. Major damage also occurred in rural areas outside of town, including at Elvis Presley Lake, where a 400-foot communication tower was toppled. Major damage continued in rural portions of Itawamba County, where 10 homes were destroyed, 29 homes suffered major damage, and 107 other homes had minor damage. 14 mobile homes were destroyed and 17 had major damage, while 30 other mobile homes suffered minor damage. Damage in Prentiss County was minor. 32 people were injured.
EF1	SSE of Winona to WSW of Kilmichael	Montgomery	MS	33.4039°N 89.6647°W	1951–1956	3.41 mi (5.49 km)	100 yd (91 m)	$70,000	One mobile home was destroyed, a second one was damaged, several homes sustained roof damage, and numerous trees were downed.
EF4	NE of Renfroe to Louisville	Leake, Neshoba, Attala, Winston	MS	32.8828°N 89.4308°W	2051–2147	33.39 mi (53.74 km)	1,320 yd (1,210 m)	$126,150,000	10 deaths – See the article on this tornado – 84 people were injured.
EF1	Northern Russellville	Franklin	AL	34.5219°N 87.7494°W	2056–2102	3.19 mi (5.13 km)	100 yd (91 m)	Unknown	A school complex sustained damage to its athletic fields. An elementary school awning was damaged, and a house sustained minor roof damage. Many trees were downed, some of which landed on homes and caused major structural damage.
EF3	SE of Rogersville to Athens	Limestone	AL	34.7753°N 87.2324°W	2147–2214	15.56 mi (25.04 km)	600 yd (550 m)	Unknown	2 deaths – A two-story condo was collapsed. A large, metal boat-storing building sustained EF2 damage, with a boat tossed 100 yd (91 m). Additional residences and condos had roof and exterior wall and siding damage, and several docks with metal protective coverings were destroyed. Several homes sustained damage, including an unanchored one that was pushed off its foundation, and a metal building was heavily damaged. A trailer park sustained EF2 damage, where two fatalities occurred. Numerous trees were snapped or uprooted, and several power poles were snapped. Thirty people were injured.
EF1	S of Vicksburg	Warren	MS	32.2835°N 90.8697°W	2156–2205	4.67 mi (7.52 km)	200 yd (180 m)	$400,000	Several trees were snapped or uprooted. Tin was pulled from a roof. One person was injured.
EF2	W of Union City, TN to W of Fulton, KY	Obion (TN), Fulton (KY)	TN, KY	36.4286°N 89.1416°W	2210–2227	12.08 mi (19.44 km)	150 yd (140 m)	$280,000	A total of eighteen structures were damaged by the tornado, mostly in Tennessee. Roofs were torn off and barns were destroyed. A machine shed sustained major damage, and a 700-pound weight was thrown 15 feet, a 40-pound jack was thrown 50 yards, and a steel trailer was bent. Significant tree damage occurred in Kentucky, and a church lost part of its roof. A barn was destroyed and a home sustained minor damage before the tornado dissipated. One person was injured.
EF1	N of Edwards to NNW of Clinton	Hinds	MS	32.3559°N 90.5975°W	2220–2242	13.75 mi (22.13 km)	500 yd (460 m)	$500,000	Several trees were snapped and uprooted and a fence was destroyed. A tin carport was destroyed and a significant amount of roofing material was torn off of a house.
EF1	SSW of Oktoc to NNW of Clinton	Noxubee, Oktibbeha	MS	33.23°N 88.79°W	2214–2229	7.11 mi (11.44 km)	100 yd (91 m)	$135,000	Several trees were snapped or uprooted.
EF0	NNW of Hamilton	Marion	AL	34.1854°N 87.998°W	2238–2253	7.72 mi (12.42 km)	100 yd (91 m)	$15,000	A building had shingles blown off, a shed was damaged, and numerous trees were downed; a tornado emergency was issued prior to the tornado at 2227 UTC.
EF1	Crawford	Lowndes	MS	33.3011°N 88.6286°W	2239–2241	0.64 mi (1.03 km)	100 yd (91 m)	$25,000	The roof of a mobile home was damaged and many trees were knocked down in town.
EF0	SE of Clinton	Hickman	KY	36.6537°N 88.8654°W	2246–2247	1.03 mi (1.66 km)	25 yd (23 m)	$2,000	A short-lived tornado downed large tree limbs.
EF1	NW of Utica area to WNW of Dry Grove	Hinds	MS	32.1229°N 90.6352°W	2248–2305	10.86 mi (17.48 km)	300 yd (270 m)	$500,000	Numerous trees and power lines were downed, with some damage to homes. A metal pole was blown through the side of a house and a small shed was also blown over. Another home suffered roof damage nearby. Tornado caused roof, siding, and skirting damage to some manufactured homes near the end of the path.
EF1	Hazel Green	Madison	AL	34.9476°N 86.6465°W	2250–2305	8.91 mi (14.34 km)	100 yd (91 m)	Unknown	Multiple homes in town sustained minor roof damage, a carport was collapsed, and hundreds of trees were downed, including an oak tree at a church that was believed to be around 150 years old.
EF2	NNE of Crawford to Columbus	Lowndes	MS	33.3664°N 88.538°W	2253–2315	10.31 mi (16.59 km)	300 yd (270 m)	$700,000	A strong wedge tornado destroyed a church along Highway 45 and caused significant damage to a well-constructed barn and several homes. Several power poles and hundreds of trees were snapped along the path of the storm. Irrigation pivots were flipped as well. Tornado dissipated at the south edge of Columbus.
EF2	NE of Wares Crossroads	Troup, Heard	GA	33.122°N 85.0556°W	2300–2310	5.7 mi (9.2 km)	150 yd (140 m)	$41,000	Four to six houses were damaged, and hundreds of hardwood trees were snapped or uprooted.
EF1	NW of Madison	Madison	MS	32.5141°N 90.1947°W	2300–2306	3.82 mi (6.15 km)	200 yd (180 m)	$450,000	Several tree limbs were snapped or downed. Shingle damage occurred to a home.
EF1	SE of Columbus to SSE of Steens	Lowndes	MS	33.49°N 88.39°W	2308–2319	6.35 mi (10.22 km)	250 yd (230 m)	$700,000	The tornado snapped and uprooted numerous trees. Falling trees caused damage to some roofs, and some outbuildings were also damaged.
EF2	SW of Flintville to NW of Huntland	Lincoln	TN	35.0186°N 86.4875°W	2309–2324	9.53 mi (15.34 km)	250 yd (230 m)	Unknown	Many trees were snapped and uprooted. The roof of an office building was blown off, two metal sheds were destroyed, and a metal silo was vaulted 150 yd (140 m). A mobile home was pushed off its foundation, and several single-family homes sustained minor roof damage.
EF0	SW of Canton	Madison	MS	32.5886°N 90.0994°W	2313–2314	0.8 mi (1.3 km)	75 yd (69 m)	$50,000	The tornado broke door and window glass at two homes, and caused shingle damage to several other homes. Several trees were knocked down as well.
EF1	SSE of Steens, MS to NW of Millport, AL	Lowndes (MS), Lamar (AL)	MS, AL	33.5251°N 88.3037°W	2319–2333	10.03 mi (16.14 km)	500 yd (460 m)	$500,000	In Mississippi, the tornado caused damage to a speedway, and several homes sustained roof and exterior damage. Dozens of trees were snapped and uprooted. In Alabama, numerous additional trees were snapped and uprooted, and several well-built homes sustained minor roof and exterior damage.
EF3	W of Richland to E of Pelahatchie	Hinds, Rankin, Scott	MS	32.2291°N 90.2225°W	2327–0015	29.72 mi (47.83 km)	400 yd (370 m)	$13,284,000	1 death – Several commercial and industrial buildings in Richland and Pearl were heavily damaged by this rain-wrapped tornado, a mobile home park in Pearl was severely damaged, and an auto dealership sustained significant roof damage. One metal frame industrial building was severely mangled. Numerous homes and several businesses all along the path sustained less severe EF1-strength damage, and Brandon Middle School's campus suffered minor damage; however, a gas station along Interstate 20 near Pelahatchie sustained significant damage shortly before the tornado dissipated. Many trees were downed along the path. The fatality occurred when a car was thrown 200 yards from Highway 49 in Richland. At least ten other people were injured. Tornado passed very close to the NWS Jackson radar site.
EF2	S of Columbus, MS to W of Shaw, AL	Lowndes (MS), Pickens (AL)	MS, AL	33.4382°N 88.4064°W	2338–0002	14.27 mi (22.97 km)	500 yd (460 m)	$500,000	Near the Mississippi–Alabama state line, two mobile homes were destroyed. Numerous trees were also downed, some of which landed on homes and outbuildings. In Alabama, several homes were damaged. One home was shifted off of its foundation, trapping ten people in the basement, five of whom suffered minor injuries. Several mobile homes were completely destroyed and one small concrete building had its roof torn off and one wall destroyed. Several roofs were damaged and trees uprooted near the end of the path.
EF1	Madden area	Leake	MS	32.6746°N 89.4246°W	0008–0019	5.05 mi (8.13 km)	100 yd (91 m)	$400,000	A chicken house was destroyed and three others were damaged. Two sheds were destroyed and the roof of a mobile home was damaged. Numerous trees were downed as well.
EF1	SE of Glen Allen to NW of Eldridge	Fayette, Marion	AL	33.8878°N 87.7094°W	0035–0048	6.97 mi (11.22 km)	350 yd (320 m)	$250,000	Several trees were snapped or uprooted. Several outbuildings were almost completely destroyed while others lost portions of their roofs.
EF3	E of Forest to WNW of Lake	Scott	MS	32.3703°N 89.4564°W	0038–0046	4.27 mi (6.87 km)	150 yd (140 m)	$700,000	A significant tornado destroyed a wood-frame home, leaving only interior walls standing and scattering the debris away from the foundation. Numerous trees were snapped and uprooted, and a chicken house was completely destroyed, with much debris carried away from the site. Three people were injured, one seriously.
EF1	NE of Lake to SW of Decatur	Newton	MS	32.3824°N 89.2825°W	0054–0110	9.57 mi (15.40 km)	150 yd (140 m)	$300,000	Trees were downed and homes sustained shingle damage. A chicken house sustained major damage as well.
EF3	SE of Belleview to SE of Lynchburg	Lincoln, Moore	TN	35.0066°N 86.5497°W	0109–0133	26.76 mi (43.07 km)	500 yd (460 m)	Unknown	2 deaths – See section on this tornado
EF2	S of Decatur	Newton	MS	32.4116°N 89.1147°W	0112–0131	5.59 mi (9.00 km)	400 yd (370 m)	$750,000	Several homes sustained significant roof damage, a cart shack at a country club was destroyed, and the golf course at the country club sustained extensive tree damage. Many other trees were downed elsewhere along the path.
EF1	S of Higdon to Shiloh	Jackson, DeKalb	AL	34.7945°N 85.6557°W	0118–0129	6.07 mi (9.77 km)	100 yd (91 m)	Unknown	A tornado caused mostly minor roof, carport, underpinning, and siding damage to multiple homes and mobile homes. Some outbuildings and a church were damaged as well. Numerous trees were snapped and uprooted along the path.
EF1	SSW of Duffee	Newton, Lauderdale	MS	32.4262°N 88.9417°W	0135–0155	13.11 mi (21.10 km)	100 yd (91 m)	$2,750,000	Damage from this tornado was primarily limited to snapped and uprooted trees, downed power lines, and some relatively minor damage to several structures.
EF1	Boldo area	Walker	AL	33.8344°N 87.1945°W	0140–0143	2.39 mi (3.85 km)	150 yd (140 m)	Unknown	Several trees were snapped and uprooted. Two homes sustained minor roof damage and a church sustained minor damage as well.
EF1	SE of York	Sumter	AL	32.4208°N 88.271°W	0230–0242	1.03 mi (1.66 km)	150 yd (140 m)	Unknown	Two well-built homes sustained significant roof damage and other structural damage. Several more homes sustained roof damage and several outbuildings were destroyed. A convenience store and local fire station were heavily damaged. Numerous trees were snapped and uprooted.
EF3	Welti to Berlin	Cullman	AL	34.0957°N 86.7598°W	0239–0258	8.88 mi (14.29 km)	350 yd (320 m)	Unknown	In Welti, the tornado snapped and uprooted numerous hardwood trees, heavily damaged a home, and completely destroyed a building that was under construction. A large travel trailer was also rolled, and damage in Welti was rated EF2. The tornado intensified to EF3 strength past Welti, snapping numerous trees and striking a chicken farm, where a well-built brick house had its top floor wiped away and blown several hundred feet into a ravine. Debris was embedded into nearby fields, and some trees on the property were mangled and partially debarked. A house lost its roof and numerous trees and power poles were downed further along the path. The tornado the re-intensified to high EF2/low EF3 strength as it significantly damaged a power substation. The tornado then struck another chicken farm at EF3 strength, obliterating several large metal chicken houses, with severe mangling of steel trusses noted. 25,000 chickens were killed in this one location. A mobile home was completely destroyed before the tornado abruptly dissipated.
EF3	SE of Sandersville	Jones, Wayne	MS	31.7420°N 89.0884°W	0240–0256	10.46 mi (16.83 km)	880 yd (800 m)	$1,850,000	Hundreds of trees were snapped and uprooted, with some denuded and partially debarked. A mobile home was destroyed, and a number of houses and additional mobile homes sustained heavy damage. A wood frame home was destroyed, with only some interior walls remaining. Fifteen people were injured.
EF1	NE of Little Sandy to S of Cottondale	Tuscaloosa	AL	33.0625°N 87.6345°W	0259–0320	12.47 mi (20.07 km)	1,500 yd (1,400 m)	Unknown	Numerous homes sustained minor shingle damage, and one home had part of its roof torn off. A small porch was ripped away from a double-wide mobile home, and hundreds of trees were downed, with several falling on and causing major damage to about 25 mobile homes. Thirteen people were injured.
EF1	Kimberly to S of Hayden	Jefferson, Blount	AL	33.7514°N 86.8303°W	0300–0320	8.78 mi (14.13 km)	800 yd (730 m)	Unknown	This tornado began near Interstate 65 and tracked northeast, snapping or uprooting hundreds of trees. The tornado moved directly through Kimberly, where several structures sustained varying degrees of damage, with the local fire department experiencing major damage. The most extensive damage occurred to the Kimberly Church of God where uplift of most of the roof structure resulted in exterior wall collapse. A large metal industrial building had one of its walls blown out as well. Four people were injured.
EF1	ENE of Cohutta, GA	Whitfield (GA), Bradley (TN)	GA, TN	34.951°N 84.8718°W	0305–0315	3.95 mi (6.36 km)	100 yd (91 m)	$120,000	A tornado caused a chicken coop to collapse, killing 16,000 chickens. A nearby farm building was also destroyed. The storm continued northeast into Tennessee where it shifted a home off its foundation before dissipating.
EF2	N of Waynesboro	Wayne	MS	31.7579°N 88.7559°W	0309–0320	9.2 mi (14.8 km)	250 yd (230 m)	$1,000,000	Several single-family houses and mobile homes sustained heavy damage or were destroyed.
EF2	Graysville	Jefferson	AL	33.5856°N 87.0055°W	0313–0323	5.46 mi (8.79 km)	1,800 yd (1,600 m)	Unknown	A strong wedge tornado snapped or uprooted numerous trees along its path. It caused significant damage to homes and businesses in Graysville, including one manufactured home that was destroyed and three others that sustained major damage. Near the Adamsville Parkway, two brick homes had exterior walls collapse while a manufactured home was damaged. Three people were injured.
EF1	NE of Brookwood to NW of Weller	Tuscaloosa, Jefferson	AL	33.3129°N 87.2197°W	0355–0404	4.46 mi (7.18 km)	675 yd (617 m)	Unknown	A tornado snapped and uprooted a number of trees. Minor tree damage occurred along the later part of the path.
EF1	SE of North Johns	Jefferson	AL	33.3162°N 87.111°W	0400–0419	7.62 mi (12.26 km)	913 yd (835 m)	Unknown	A tornado snapped and uprooted hundreds of trees.
EF2	Bessemer	Jefferson	AL	33.3592°N 86.995°W	0416–0425	5.14 mi (8.27 km)	600 yd (550 m)	Unknown	Hundreds of trees were uprooted or snapped, many of which fell on homes. The worst damage occurred at the municipal golf course, where the clubhouse was destroyed. Several homes and an apartment complex suffered roof damage.
EF1	NNW of Highland Lake	Blount	AL	33.8908°N 86.4871°W	0422–0435	7.81 mi (12.57 km)	1,000 yd (910 m)	Unknown	A few homes and buildings sustained largely minor damage, although one chicken barn and one older home were heavily impacted. Hay barns and outbuildings sustained significant damage, and numerous trees were snapped or uprooted.

=== April 29 event ===
List of reported tornadoes – Tuesday, April 29, 2014
EF#	Location	County / Parish	State	Start Coord.	Time (UTC)	Path length	Max width	Damage	Summary
EF1	SSE of Grove Hill	Clarke	AL	31.5759°N 87.7633°W	0515–0517	0.31 mi (0.50 km)	200 yd (180 m)	$5,000	Numerous trees were snapped and uprooted. Two homes and a barn sustained minor roof damage.
EF2	N of Springville	St. Clair, Blount	AL	33.7993°N 86.5395°W	0524–0543	14.6 mi (23.5 km)	1,300 yd (1,200 m)	Unknown	A home under construction was swept off its foundation thrown 50 yd (46 m) into a lake. A small utility trailer was thrown similar distances, a manufactured home was destroyed, and numerous trees were snapped or uprooted. Numerous additional homes sustained damage, including one that had its roof ripped off and walls collapsed. Two people were injured.
EF3	E of Sardis City to SE of Crossville	Etowah, DeKalb	AL	34.1703°N 86.0439°W	0532–0547	11.73 mi (18.88 km)	600 yd (550 m)	Unknown	A home was lifted off its block foundation and moved 60–80 ft (18–24 m), but its walls remained mostly intact. Several manufactured homes were destroyed and two others suffered significant damage to their roofs and exterior walls. A two-story home was destroyed with just a few interior walls left standing and the debris scattered hundreds of yards. A chicken house was completely destroyed. In DeKalb County near the Aroney community, a trailer home was completely destroyed with its undercarriage so mangled that it was nearly unrecognizable. Several other homes suffered significant roof damage further along the path, with one roof almost completely removed. A barn and an outbuilding were destroyed as well. Many trees were snapped and uprooted along the path, including a few that were debarked.
EF2	Northern Dawson	DeKalb	AL	34.3073°N 85.9305°W	0554–0600	2.47 mi (3.98 km)	200 yd (180 m)	Unknown	A strong tornado struck the north side of the small community of Dawson, where several homes and mobile homes sustained roof damage, and one home was severely damaged and lost most of its roof. Several large farm buildings were significantly damaged, and numerous trees were snapped and uprooted.
EF2	W of Fort Payne	DeKalb	AL	34.3491°N 85.8401°W	0606–0627	11.71 mi (18.85 km)	200 yd (180 m)	Unknown	A mobile home was separated from its undercarriage and completely destroyed, and other homes and mobile homes sustained roof and window damage. Numerous trees and power poles were snapped and along the path.
EF1	NW of Sardis City	Etowah	AL	34.0896°N 86.1550°W	0617–0627	6.28 mi (10.11 km)	200 yd (180 m)	Unknown	A tornado touched down, snapping and uprooting trees. One house was shifted off its foundation but suffered only minor roof damage. A wooden barn was heavily damaged as well. Several trailers were damaged with one losing its roof and a portion of its exterior walls, and another losing most of its roof and carport. A two-story house lost part of its roof covering.
EF0	Aroney to S of Kilpatrick	DeKalb	AL	34.2243°N 86.0781°W	0628–0632	2.42 mi (3.89 km)	75 yd (69 m)	Unknown	Tornado caused minor damage to homes, farm buildings, and trees.
EF1	S of Mentone to Lookout Mountain	DeKalb	AL	34.5048°N 85.6174°W	0636–0651	10.2 mi (16.4 km)	200 yd (180 m)	Unknown	South of Mentone, numerous trees were downed and outbuildings sustained minor damage. The tornado then struck Mentone, where only minor tree damage occurred. More severe tree damage occurred north of town before the tornado dissipated.
EF1	Pumpkin Center area	DeKalb	AL	34.4282°N 85.6466°W	0723–0725	1.05 mi (1.69 km)	200 yd (180 m)	Unknown	Numerous trees were snapped and uprooted, and a barn was leveled. Tin roofing from the barn was found 1/3 of a mile away.
EF0	SW of Society Hill	Macon	AL	32.4170°N 85.4585°W	0825–0827	1.74 mi (2.80 km)	75 yd (69 m)	Unknown	Society Hill Methodist Church sustained minor roof damage and numerous trees were uprooted.
EF3	NW of Crawford to Smiths Station	Russell, Lee	AL	32.4650°N 85.2336°W	0856–0912	11.45 mi (18.43 km)	1,200 yd (1,100 m)	Unknown	A tornado touched down northwest of Crawford and tracked northeast. Damage was initially confined to trees before it intensified. After crossing SR 169, it reached EF3 intensity and lifted six manufactured homes off their foundations and rolled them, completely destroying them. A two-story home nearby had its second floor destroyed. Three nearby wood frame homes were also lifted off their foundations and completely destroyed, with others sustaining roof damage. Hundreds of trees in the area were snapped or uprooted and some experienced debarking. Continuing northeast, dozens more homes sustained varying degrees of damage. The tornado later dissipated after crossing US 280 and causing minor tree damage in Smith's Station. Thirteen people were injured.
EF0	SW of Cove City	Craven	NC	35.17°N 77.35°W	1825–1826	0.04 mi (0.064 km)	25 yd (23 m)	$0	Tornado briefly touched down in an open field, causing no damage.
EF1	E of Stedman	Cumberland	NC	35.02°N 78.682°W	1952–1959	1.72 mi (2.77 km)	200 yd (180 m)	$50,000	Nearly a dozen homes sustained roof damage, ranging from loss of shingles to a single-wide mobile home that lost its entire roof. Dozens of trees were downed as well.
EF0	NNE of Conetoe	Edgecombe	NC	35.848°N 77.434°W	2209–2220	4.15 mi (6.68 km)	100 yd (91 m)	$25,000	Several mobile homes and outbuildings sustained minor damage, and numerous trees were downed as well.
EF0	NE of Shine	Greene	NC	35.441°N 77.7891°W	2349–2350	0.02 mi (0.032 km)	25 yd (23 m)	$0	Tornado briefly touched down in an open field, causing no damage.
EF1	SW of Hobbton	Sampson	NC	35.1491°N 78.3948°W	0010–0112	0.81 mi (1.30 km)	100 yd (91 m)	$355,000	Brief tornado leveled a hog house, caused roof damage to a home, and downed several trees.

=== April 30 event ===
List of confirmed tornadoes – Wednesday, April 30, 2014
EF#	Location	County / Parish	State	Start Coord.	Time (UTC)	Path length	Max width	Damage	Summary
EF1	S of Graceville	Jackson	FL	30.8785°N 85.5282°W	0644–0652	1.62 mi (2.61 km)	100 yd (91 m)	$200,000	Several homes were damaged and numerous trees were downed. One house was severely damaged when a large oak tree fell through it.
EF1	SE of Campbellton	Jackson	FL	30.8788°N 85.3641°W	0652–0700	4.61 mi (7.42 km)	150 yd (140 m)	$3,000	Numerous trees were downed.

== See also ==
- Tornadoes of 2014
- Tornado outbreak of April 27–30, 2014
