= Tornado outbreak and floods of April 27–30, 2014 =

Tornado outbreak in the United States

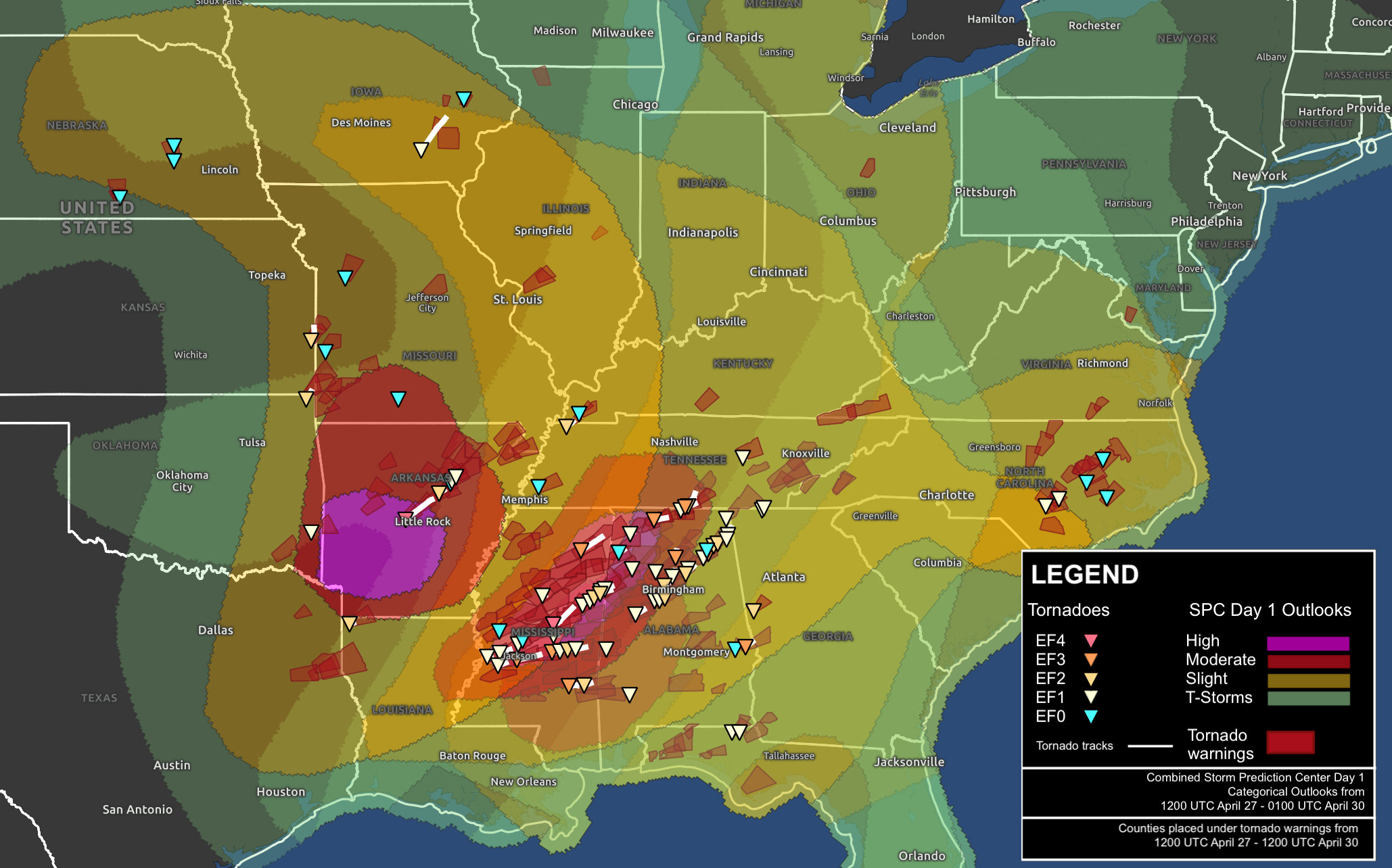
- Map of tornadoes and counties placed under tornado warnings from April 27 to April 30

Meteorological history
- Duration: April 27–30, 2014 (Note: Flooding continued into May 1.)

Tornado outbreak
- Tornadoes: 82
- Max. rating: EF4 tornado
- Duration: 2 days, 13 hours
- Highest winds: Tornadic – 190 mph (310 km/h) (Vilonia, Arkansas EF4 on April 27)
- Highest gusts: Non-tornadic – 90 mph (140 km/h) (Evarts, Kentucky straight-line winds)
- Largest hail: 4.5 in (11 cm) in Atlanta, Texas

Extratropical cyclone
- Lowest pressure: 981 hPa (mbar); 28.97 inHg
- Max. rainfall: 23.67 in (60.1 cm) in Orange Beach, Alabama
- Max. snowfall: 10 in (25 cm) in 3 locations in South Dakota

Overall effects
- Fatalities: 35 (+1 non-tornadic)
- Injuries: 447 injuries
- Damage: ≥$1 billion (2014 USD)
- Areas affected: Midwestern, Southern and Eastern United States
- Part of the tornado outbreaks of 2014, the 2013–14 North American winter and flood events in the United States in 2014

A relatively widespread, damaging, and deadly tornado outbreak and severe flooding struck the central and southern United States in late April 2014, with the bulk of the activity occurring on April 27 and 28. The storm complex responsible for the outbreak produced multiple long-track and intense to violent tornadoes – seven of which were deadly, causing 35 fatalities. One additional death occurred in Florida, due to severe flooding associated with this system. On April 27, the Storm Prediction Center (SPC) first issued a high risk for parts of Arkansas, as a broad upper-level trough slowed over the High Plains and Central United States, where strong tornadic activity occurred, including a violent high-end EF4 tornado that devastated the towns of Mayflower and Vilonia that evening, killing 16 and injuring nearly 200, necessitating the issuance of a tornado emergency. Multiple other strong tornadoes touched down that night as well.

April 28 saw the most prolific tornado activity, with another high risk issued by the SPC and a particularly dangerous situation tornado watch for parts of central Mississippi and Alabama, and multiple intense to violent tornadoes touched down across the Deep South. Another violent high-end EF4 tornado struck the town of Louisville, Mississippi, killing ten and injuring 84. A few more deadly tornadoes touched down in Tennessee and Alabama that night; including an EF3 near Flintville, Tennessee that killed two – several more tornado emergencies were issued that day as well, the most in a single day since the March 2, 2012 tornado outbreak. Scattered activity and weaker tornadoes occurred on April 29 and 30 across the eastern U.S. before the outbreak came to an end.

This event was the first major tornado outbreak to hit the United States in 2014; it covered a large swath from Nebraska to Louisiana, Illinois to Florida, and Oklahoma to North Carolina. This system affected millions in the Northeastern United States on April 30, causing significant, damaging floods in Maryland and flash flood advisories as far north as New Jersey, Pennsylvania, and the metropolitan area and suburbs of New York City. With a grand total of 82 tornadoes over a four-day period, the tornado outbreak gained 97 points on the outbreak intensity score.

Severe and catastrophic flash flooding also occurred in the Deep South, due to a slow-moving cold front associated with the tornado outbreak. It dumped a record setting amount of rainfall, inundating the western Florida Panhandle and Southwest Alabama. Pensacola was estimated to have received as much as 26 inches of rain in only 25 hours, with 5.68 inches of it falling in only an hour at Pensacola International Airport. A landslide caused a major portion of Scenic Highway in Pensacola to collapse into the bay it overlooks. Areas east of Pensacola received as much as 15–20 inches of rain, peaking at 20.39 inches in Milton and 14.15 inches at Mary Esther. The majority of this rainfall occurred in a time period of about 9 hours on the morning of April 30. In Alabama, rainfall amounts peaked at 23.67 inches in Orange Beach, and 17.20 inches in Mobile.

== Meteorological synopsis ==
The Storm Prediction Center (SPC) indicated the potential for a large-scale tornado outbreak for six days in advance on its 4–8 day outlook, beginning early on April 19 valid at day 5. While models diverged on the exact nature and intensity of the expected mid-level shortwave trough, there was broad support for a dry line to develop in central Oklahoma. By April 22, the SPC expanded the threat zone for day 6 for the remainder of Oklahoma and central High Plains region, with strong upper-level winds to spread over the central High Plains. Three days later, a Day 3 moderate risk was issued early on April 25 for the Ark-La-Tex region, citing the increased risk for a severe weather outbreak, with the risk of trailing supercells.

=== April 27 ===
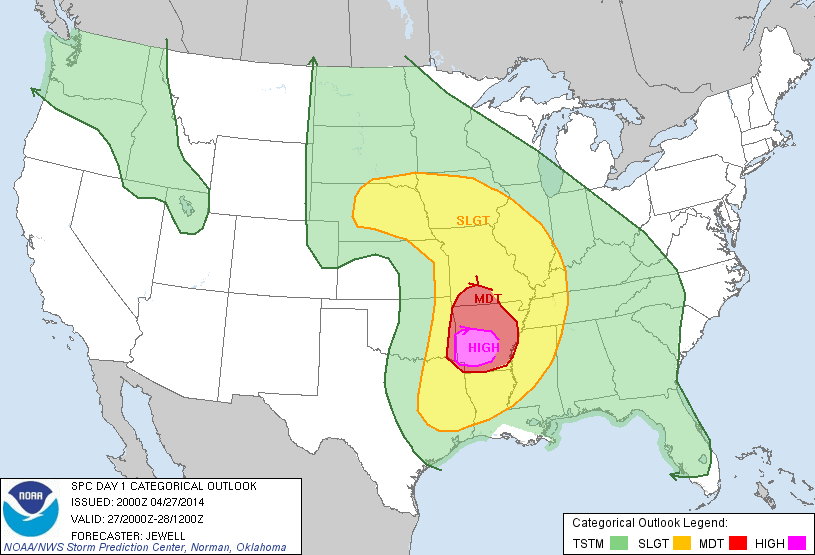
High risk convective outlook issued by the Storm Prediction Center at 20:00 UTC on April 27

The strong mid-level shortwave trough developed into a closed low-pressure area as the system occluded over the central High Plains on April 27, 2014. An associated surface cyclone reached peak intensity while a trailing cold front moved eastward across eastern Kansas, eastern Oklahoma and northern Texas. There were two areas where severe weather was expected: morning pre-frontal convection from Kansas and Oklahoma into Missouri and Iowa and warm sector supercell development across southeast Oklahoma and northeast Texas into Arkansas. By 20:00 UTC on April 27, the SPC issued a rare high risk for much of central Arkansas and a 30% hatched risk for tornadoes across the same corridor, citing the anticipation of numerous supercells capable of producing intense tornadoes. Expected thermodynamic conditions of storm-relative helicity values in of 300–400 m^{2}s^{−2}, convective available potential energy (CAPE) values of 2,500–3,000 J/kg^{−1}, a 40–50 kn low level jet and boundary-layer dewpoints of 57 to 61 °F (14 to 16 °C) were expected to foster supercell development and strong to intense tornadoes across Arkansas, along with very large hail. A particularly dangerous situation (PDS) tornado watch was issued at that time for central Arkansas.

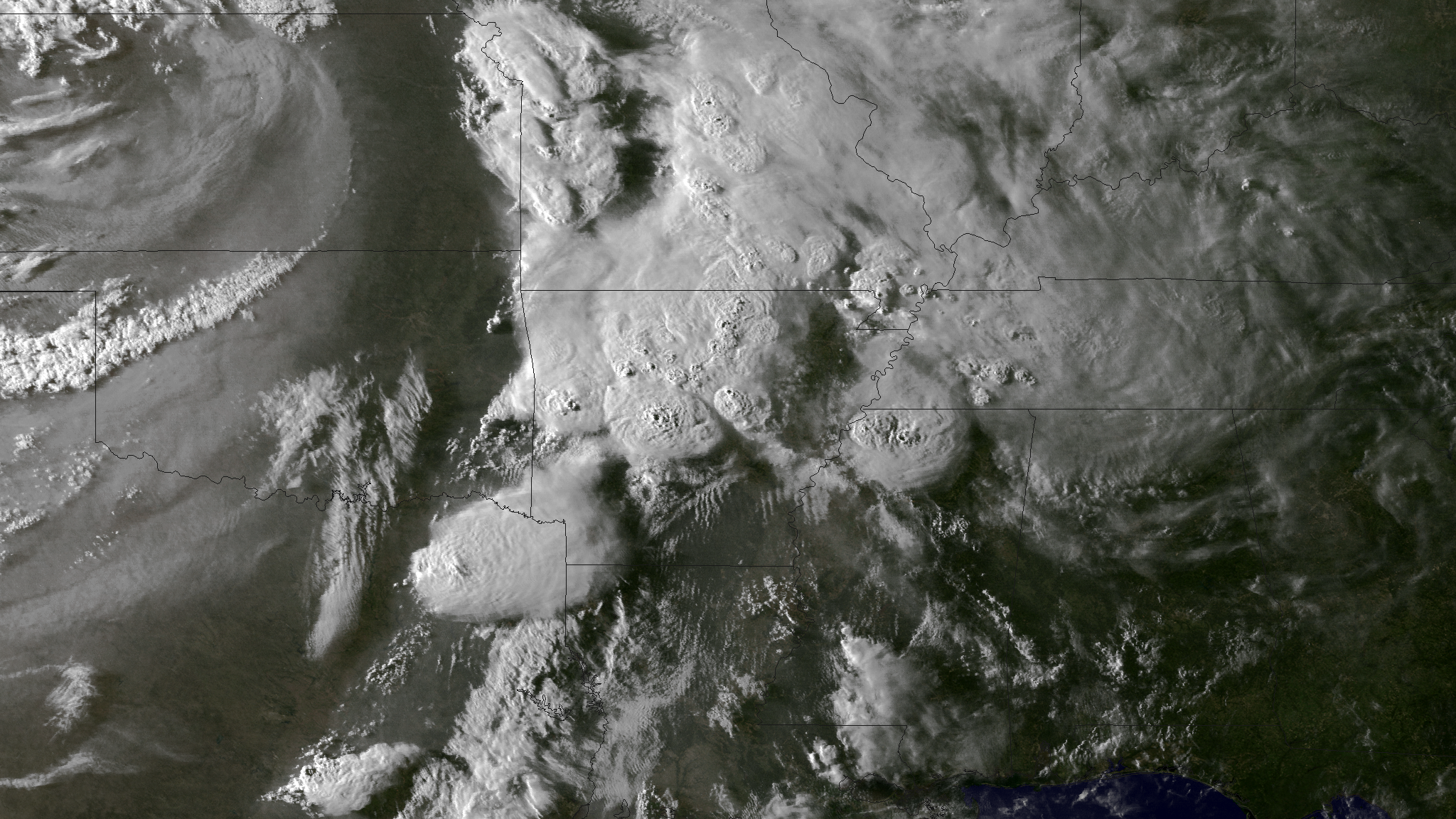
GOES 13 image of the storm complex and associated supercells at 2345 UTC on April 27

As the evening progressed, multiple intense tornadoes touched down across parts of the Midwest, Ozarks, and Great Plains. A strong EF2 tornado struck Quapaw, Oklahoma and Baxter Springs, Kansas, resulting in one fatality, 37 injuries, and severe damage in both towns. An EF1 tornado destroyed multiple outbuildings, killing two people as it passed near Martinsburg, Iowa. A large, violent wedge tornado struck Mayflower and Vilonia, Arkansas later that evening, causing catastrophic damage and killing 16 people as numerous homes and businesses were obliterated, some of which were swept completely away. Trees were completely denuded and debarked, vehicles were thrown and mangled beyond recognition by the tornado, which was rated a high-end EF4, the first violent tornado of the year.

=== April 28 ===
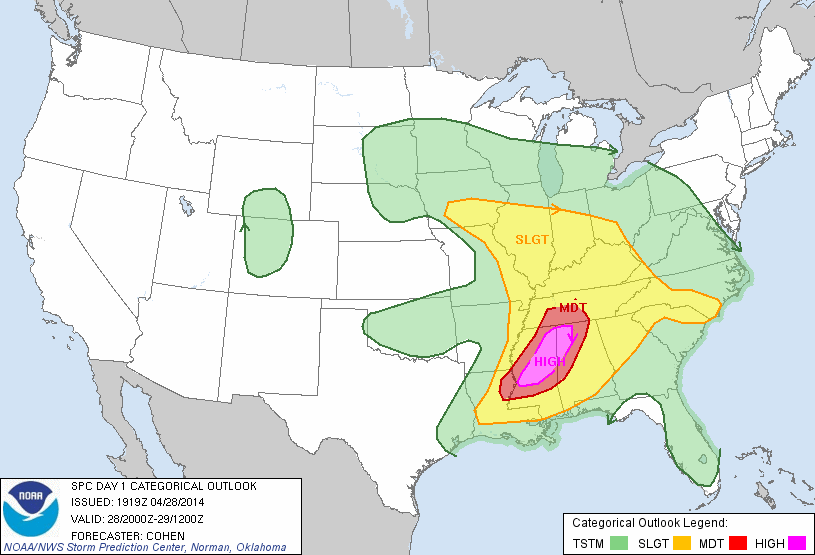
High risk convective outlook issued by the Storm Prediction Center at 19:19 UTC on April 28

On April 28, morning storms that were present over Mississippi, Alabama, and Tennessee began dissipating over time, leaving a well-defined outflow boundary across south-central Tennessee and more diffuse across the northern parts of Mississippi and Alabama. The morning storms dissipating also allowed strong surface heating to start across Louisiana and southwest Mississippi, with further clearing expected to occur. By the afternoon, weakening convective inhibition allowed storm development along or east of the outflow boundary. Mid-level convective available potential energy (CAPE) was expected to be near 2,000 j/kg, with strong bulk shear of 50–60 kn (93–111 km/h; 58–69 mph), storm-relative helicity at 200-300 ms2/s2, and subtle forcing favored a discrete or cluster supercells mode. With all these variables, at 2:19 p.m. CDT, the SPC upgraded to a high risk for most of central Mississippi and parts of Alabama, accompanied by a 30% hatched risk for strong to violent tornadoes.

At 12:40 p.m. CDT, a particularly dangerous situation tornado watch was issued most of Mississippi, parts of Louisiana, Alabama, and southern Tennessee, with some long-lived supercells capable of producing strong and long-tracked tornadoes. The tornado watch noted that surface based storm were beginning to develop in Louisiana and Mississippi as more clearing occurred and atmospheric destabilization continued, a combination of a moderate ML CAPE and strong deep vertical wind shear supported a broken band of supercells, with an increase in low-level shear expected across central Mississippi, northwest Alabama, and southern Tennessee along the outflow boundary.

By 3:49 p.m. CDT, numerous discrete and clustered supercells were moving northwest from central Mississippi into northwest Alabama, with the damaging Tupelo EF3 tornado already occurring within the past hour as more discrete supercells initiated south into central Mississippi, suggesting that these storms will more likely remain separated for a few more hours, increasing support for long-tracked and significant tornadoes. Local observations showed an expected strengthening of the wind profiles and additional support from the low-level flow associated with surface pressure deepening, boosting storm relative helicity. Strong to violent tornado damage was expected over the next few hours with the most potent supercells. Destructive tornadoes continued to touch down later that evening, and 10 people were killed when an EF4 tornado struck Louisville, Mississippi, where many homes, apartment buildings, and businesses were completely destroyed, some of which were leveled or swept away. An EF3 tornado caused one fatality and major damage to many structures in Tupelo, Mississippi as well, and another EF3 struck Coxey, Alabama, destroying a mobile home park and killing two people. Numerous other strong tornadoes occurred in rural areas of the Deep South later that night and into the early morning hours of April 29.

=== April 29–30 ===
Additional weak tornadoes touched down in The Carolinas and Florida on April 29 and 30 before the outbreak came to an end. 82 tornadoes were confirmed as a result of this outbreak, which resulted in 35 fatalities. In addition to the tornado outbreak, a lone EF0 tornado occurred in Pierce County, Washington on April 27, causing minor damage.

== Confirmed tornadoes ==
Confirmed tornadoes by Enhanced Fujita rating
EFU	EF0	EF1	EF2	EF3	EF4	EF5	Total
0	18	37	16	9	2	0	82

A total of 82 tornadoes over a period of four days were confirmed. Collectively, they resulted in 35 fatalities and 447 injuries.

=== Quapaw, Oklahoma/Baxter Springs, Kansas ===
Quapaw, Oklahoma/Baxter Springs, Kansas
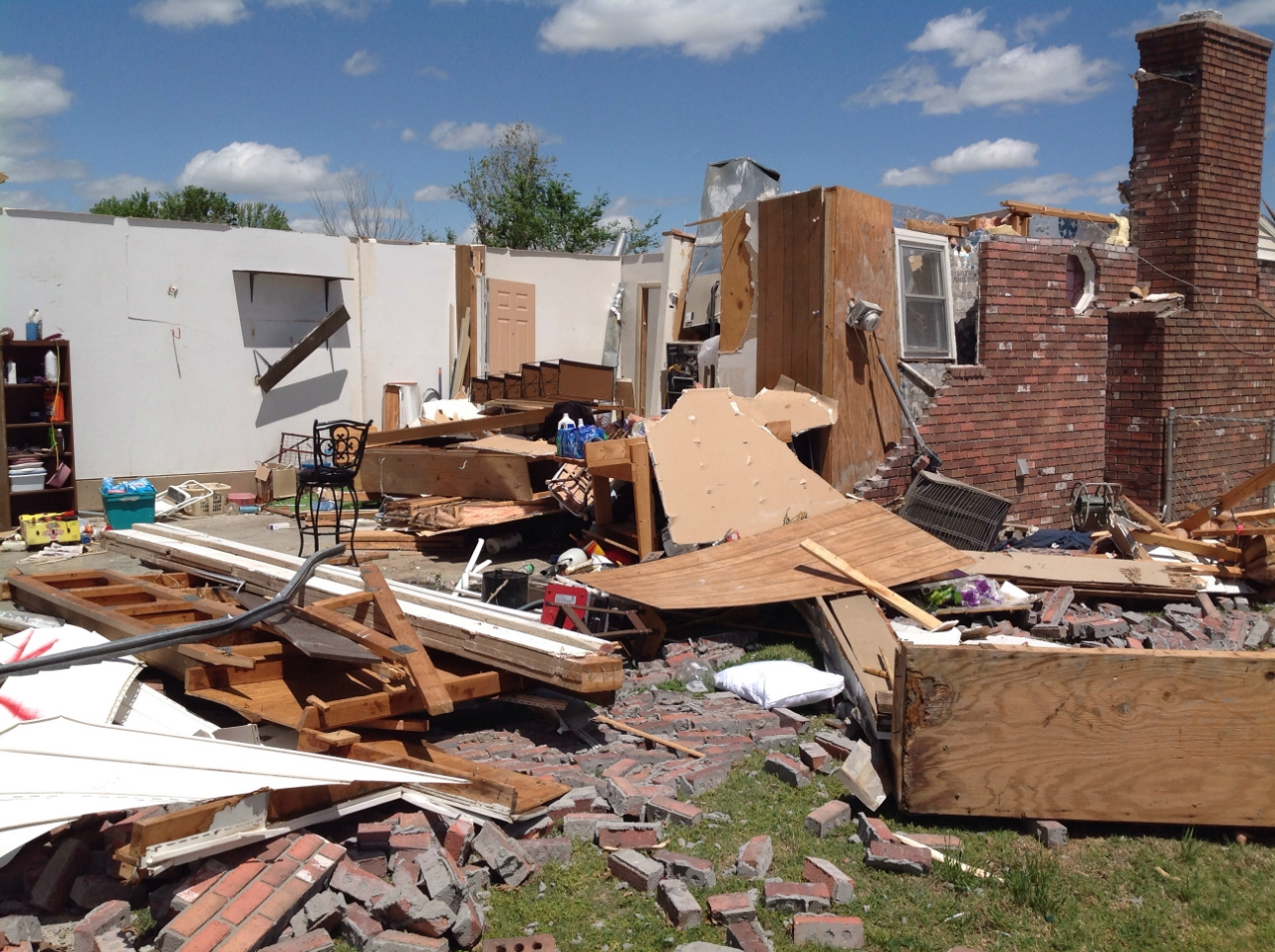
- High-end EF2 damage to a home in Quapaw, Oklahoma.

Meteorological history
- Formed: April 27, 2014, 5:29 p.m. CDT (UTC−05:00)
- Dissipated: April 27, 2014, 5:42 p.m. CDT (UTC−05:00)
- Duration: 13 minutes

EF2 tornado
- on the Enhanced Fujita scale
- Highest winds: 130 mph (210 km/h)

Overall effects
- Fatalities: 1
- Injuries: 37

The first significant tornado of the outbreak touched down over an open field at 5:29 p.m. CDT (2229 UTC) on April 27 to the southwest of Quapaw, Oklahoma and caused EF0 damage to a ranch. It caused minor damage to homes and downed trees as it neared US 69A. Shortly thereafter, it struck the town of Quapaw at high-end EF2 strength and caused extensive damage. The local fire station was largely destroyed, and some industrial buildings sustained heavy damage. Homes in town were shifted off of their foundations or sustained loss of roofs and walls. Two people seeking shelter from the tornado in their car were struck by debris from the building they were next to; one of the occupants was killed while the other was injured. A total of 12 people were injured in the town, 7 of whom required hospitalization. A total of 50 structures were damaged or destroyed in Quapaw.

The storm continued northeast and crossed the Oklahoma–Kansas state line, causing EF1-strength damage to outbuildings and downing trees and power poles. It soon moved directly through the town of Baxter Springs at high-end EF2 strength, where many homes and businesses lost their roofs, several of which had their exterior walls collapse. 90 homes and 11 businesses were destroyed, and an additional seven businesses and 85 homes suffered damage in Baxter Springs. A total of 34 people were injured in town, 9 of whom were hospitalized. The tornado continued northeast and eventually dissipated 2.5 miles (4.0 km) from the town at 5:42 p.m. CDT (2242 UTC). Overall, the tornado remained on the ground for 13 minutes along a 11.25 miles (18.11 km) path, causing 1 death and 37 injuries.

This particular tornado was unusual in that no tornado warning was issued for Quapaw before it struck the town. Meteorologists at the National Weather Service in Tulsa later stated that radar signatures showed no signs of a tornado until it was already over the town and by the time the warning was issued, it had moved into Kansas. The warning for Baxter Springs came only minutes before the tornado struck the city, catching residents off-guard and forcing them to scramble for shelter.

=== Northpoint–Mayflower–Vilonia–El Paso, Arkansas ===
Northpoint–Mayflower–Vilonia–El Paso, Arkansas
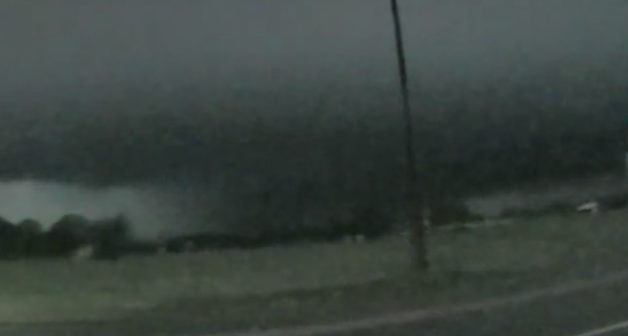
- The tornado approaching Vilonia

Meteorological history
- Formed: April 27, 2014, 7:06 p.m. CDT (UTC−05:00)
- Dissipated: April 27, 2014, 8:02 p.m. CDT (UTC−05:00)
- Duration: 56 minutes

EF4 tornado
- on the Enhanced Fujita scale
- Highest winds: 190 mph (310 km/h)

Overall effects
- Fatalities: 16
- Injuries: 193
- Damage: $223.45 million (2014 USD)

This destructive and deadly tornado touched down in extreme western Pulaski County, Arkansas, roughly 6 miles (9.7 km) east of Paron, and tracked north-northeast. Within a minute, the tornado dramatically intensified and struck a small residential area at EF3 intensity. There, two homes were destroyed and another was severely damaged. The storm weakened as it turned more northeasterly and moved through a forested area. Damage to trees and homes in this area was rated EF1. At 7:14 p.m. (0014 UTC), it struck Northpoint as an EF2, causing severe damage to several homes. Roofs were removed entirely from homes, though the walls on these structures remained mostly intact. After briefly crossing Lake Maumelle, the tornado caused significant tree damage between Roland and Natural Steps with some trees being stripped of their foliage and debarked. Moving through an unpopulated area, the tornado intensified before crossing the Arkansas River and entering Faulkner County around 7:26 p.m. (0026 UTC).

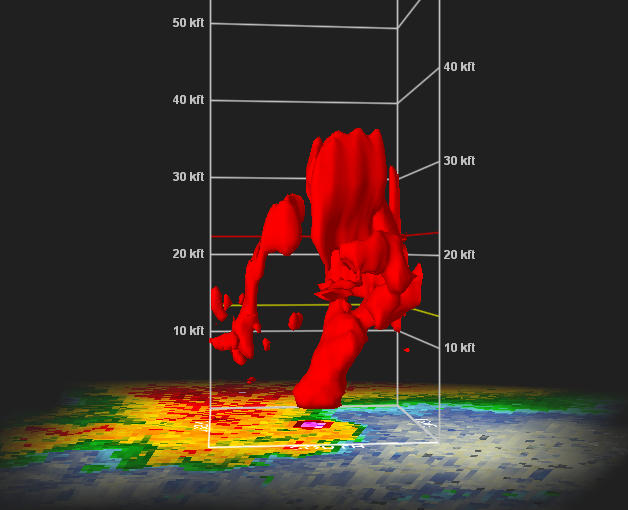
Weather radar reflectivity data in 3D of the supercell that produced the Vilonia tornado

The tornado entered Faulkner County and struck the River Plantation subdivision at the southwest edge of Mayflower. Here, EF4 damage took place with large, two-story homes being leveled with only piles of debris left on their foundations. On the northeast side of the subdivision, one person was killed after debris struck the door of her storm shelter and opened it, exposing her to the tornado. The storm shelter's door was found to have been of sub-standard construction. Near where this fatality took place, large concrete road barriers were blown over and moved, and calculations revealed that this was also likely indicative of EF4 intensity. Just outside the subdivision, a power substation sustained major damage. Continuing northeast, the storm tore across the south edge of Mayflower and crossed AR 365 and I-40, tossing semi-trucks, cars, and road equipment from the highway. I-40 was closed for a time after the storm. A recreational vehicle dealership on the other side of the highway was completely destroyed at EF4 intensity (though meteorologist/civil engineer Tim Marshall applied an EF3 rating at this location due to structural flaws), along with most of the RVs; three of which were found wrapped around a nearby billboard. A vehicle repair shop, millwork company, construction company, and church in southern Mayflower were also destroyed, and a home improvement store was badly damaged. In addition to the fatality in the storm shelter, two other people were killed in Mayflower. The tornado then crossed Lake Conway, downing numerous trees and causing a mixture of EF2 and EF3 damage to homes along the lakeshore.

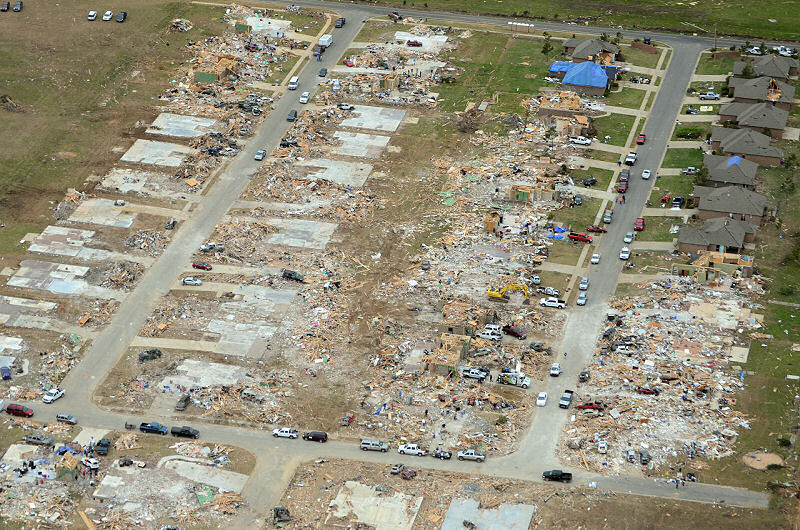
An aerial view of the Parkwood Meadows subdivision in Vilonia, where several homes were completely leveled and swept clean off their foundations.

Shortly before 7:50 p.m. (0050 UTC), the tornado moved into the town of Vilonia at high-end EF4 strength, which was struck by an EF2 tornado that killed four people on April 25, 2011. The tornado first struck the recently built Vilonia Middle School, destroying the top floor and causing most walls to collapse. An aerial flyover revealed an extensive swath of ground scouring through the town. A dollar store, a strip mall, two auto repair shops, the old city hall, a gas station, a church life center, a real estate office, an investment firm, an auto parts store, and a fried fish restaurant were all completely destroyed in downtown Vilonia. The crumpled remains of a 29,998-pound metal fertilizer tank was found behind the destroyed strip mall, nearly 3/4 mi (1.2 km) away from where it originated. Nine people were killed in the town. As it moved out of downtown Vilonia, it tore directly through the Parkwood Meadows subdivision at the northeast side of town. Entire rows of homes were reduced to bare slabs at this location, though it was revealed that the vast majority of the homes were nailed rather than bolted to their foundations, preventing an EF5 rating.

Continuing past Vilonia, the tornado weakened to EF3 strength as it passed just south of Williams Lake. A large metal arena building and a mobile home were destroyed in that area, with a few other structures sustaining EF1 damage nearby. Shortly after 8:00 p.m. (0100 UTC) the storm moved through densely forested areas and into White County, just west of El Paso. The tornado briefly regained EF2 status and destroyed two manufactured homes. One person was killed in one of the manufactured homes at this location. It soon dissipated at 8:02 p.m. (0106 UTC) roughly 1 mile (1.6 km) north-northeast of El Paso near a forested area.

Overall, the tornado remained on the ground for an hour, from 7:06 p.m. to 8:02 p.m. (0006 – 0102 UTC), and traveled along a 41.3 miles (66.5 km) path. Sixteen people lost their lives due to the tornado while 193 others were injured. The 16 fatalities made this the deadliest in Arkansas since an F4 tornado killed 35 on May 15, 1968.

=== Louisville, Mississippi ===
Noxapater–Louisville, Mississippi
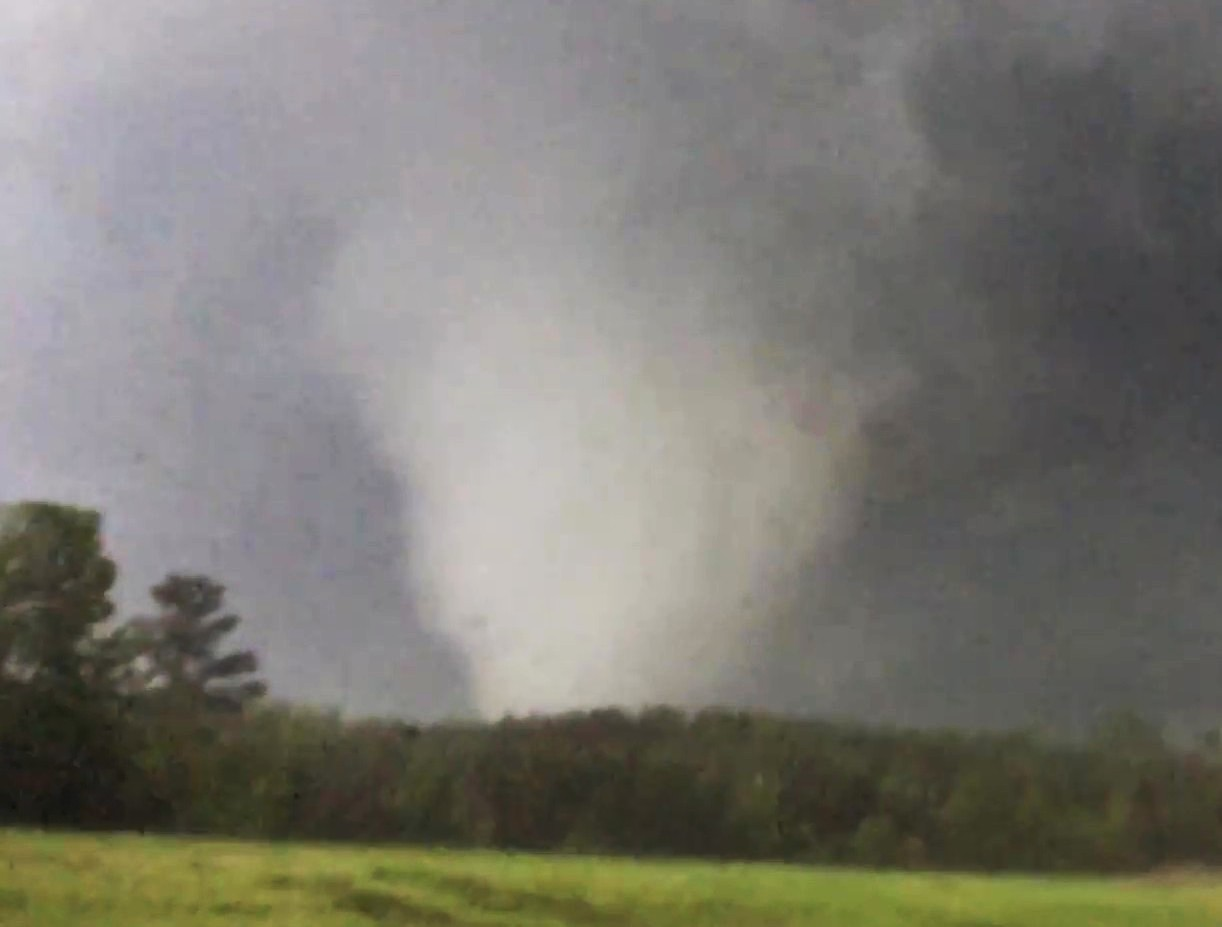
- The tornado shortly before becoming rain-wrapped

Meteorological history
- Formed: April 28, 2014, 3:51 p.m. CDT (UTC−05:00)
- Dissipated: April 28, 2014, 4:47 p.m. CDT (UTC−05:00)
- Duration: 56 minutes

EF4 tornado
- on the Enhanced Fujita scale
- Highest winds: 185 mph (298 km/h)

Overall effects
- Fatalities: 10
- Injuries: 84
- Damage: $126 million (2014 USD)

This violent, rain wrapped, and long-tracked wedge tornado tracked across northern Mississippi and through the small town of Louisville on the evening of the 28th, killing 10 people, injuring over 80 and leaving major damage in its wake. The tornado touched down in Leake County, initially snapping numerous trees at EF1 intensity as it moved through heavily forested areas. The tornado proceeded to reach EF2 intensity as it completely destroyed a mobile home and a metal building. Three cars were tossed nearby, and a frame home lost most of its roof, sustaining EF1 damage. Maintaining EF2 intensity, the tornado crossed into Winston County at the Attala/Neshoba County border. Numerous trees were snapped and a house sustained roof damage at that location. The tornado then weakened momentarily, causing only EF1-strength tree damage as it moved through dense forest. Continuing northeast, the tornado reintensified dramatically and reached EF3 strength as it heavily damaged or destroyed several homes and metal chicken houses. Some of the homes sustained collapse of their exterior walls. Slightly further along the path, a large area of trees along Hartness Rd sustained extreme denuding and debarking, with only stubs of the largest branches remaining. The severity and consistency of the debarking/denuding was severe enough that surveyors applied an EF4 rating at that location. Numerous chicken houses were destroyed at EF3 intensity nearby.

Slight weakening occurred beyond this point, with consistent EF2 damage occurring: a house had its roof torn off, a mobile home was completely destroyed, and numerous trees were snapped. The tornado then regained low-end EF4 intensity, where a large complex of metal chicken houses was obliterated with little trace of them left. Nearly 220,000 chickens were killed. A nearby cell phone tower was toppled, and several homes at the edge of the path sustained roof damage. The tornado maintained EF4 strength as it moved northwest of Noxapater, sweeping away a brick building and a brick home, obliterating a mobile home, and debarking numerous trees. The tornado then weakened slightly, snapping numerous trees and power poles and destroying chicken houses at EF3 intensity. After that, the tornado weakened further, but maintained EF2 intensity as it made a dramatic turn to the north, roughly following and eventually crossing MS 15. Many trees and power poles were snapped, homes had their roofs torn off, and many mobile homes were completely destroyed in this area. One mobile home frame was found wrapped around a tree in this area.

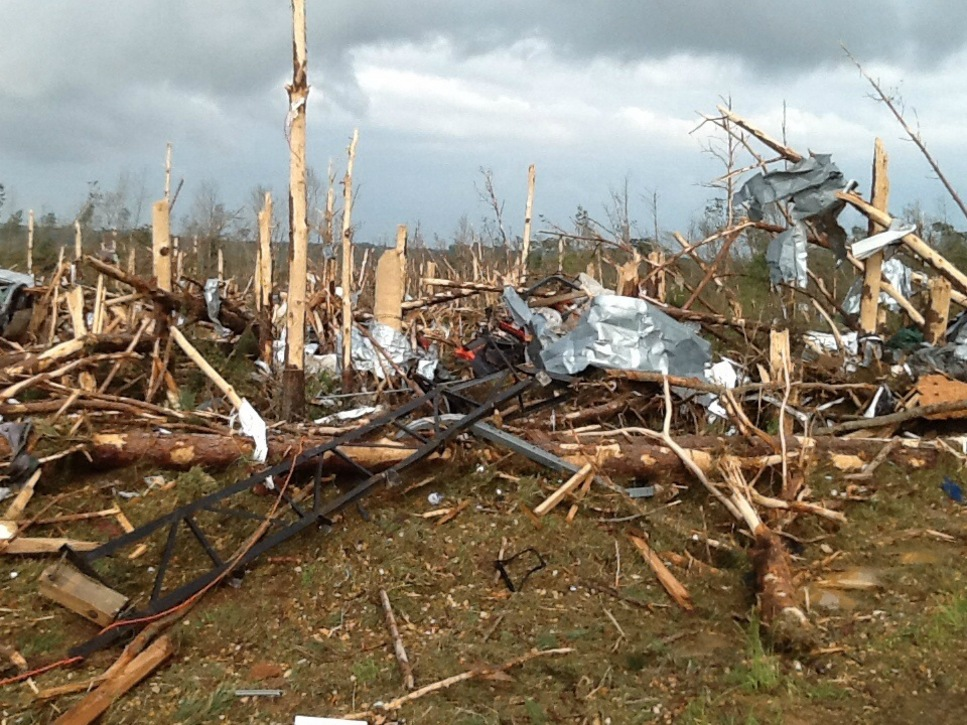
Extreme tree damage in rural Winston County.

The tornado re-intensified as it continued sharply northeastward into the south side of Louisville at EF3 strength, destroying numerous homes in residential areas. The tornado then re-attained EF4 strength as it completely destroyed three large factories in an industrial area of town, including a Georgia-Pacific plywood plant. The tornado maintained its strength as it devastated nearby subdivisions and an apartment complex, with some homes and one of the apartment buildings reduced to bare slabs. Several homes and churches were leveled or swept away in this area as well. Past this point, additional homes were destroyed at EF3 intensity, with debarking and denuding of trees noted. The tornado then passed through a wooded area and across the east edge of town, striking the Winston County Medical Center in the process. The building sustained EF3 damage, with numerous cars flipped and tossed in the parking lot. A daycare center and an automobile showroom were completely leveled across the street from the medical center, both of which were housed in manufactured structures. The owner of the daycare center died while shielding a 4-year-old child from the tornado as it struck. The tornado made another sharp turn and began moving due-north through residential areas on northeast side of town. Numerous homes sustained EF3 to EF4-strength damage in this area, including one that was reduced to a bare foundation slab. Continuing north of town, the tornado caused EF2 and EF3-strength damage to homes, trees, and power poles before dissipating in a wooded area near MS 25.

Overall, ten people were killed by this tornado, and many others were injured. Some victims were found hundreds of yards from their homes. A wooden door from Louisville was found 30 miles (48 km) away at the Mississippi State University campus.

=== Flintville–Lynchburg, Tennessee ===
Flintville–Lynchburg, Tennessee
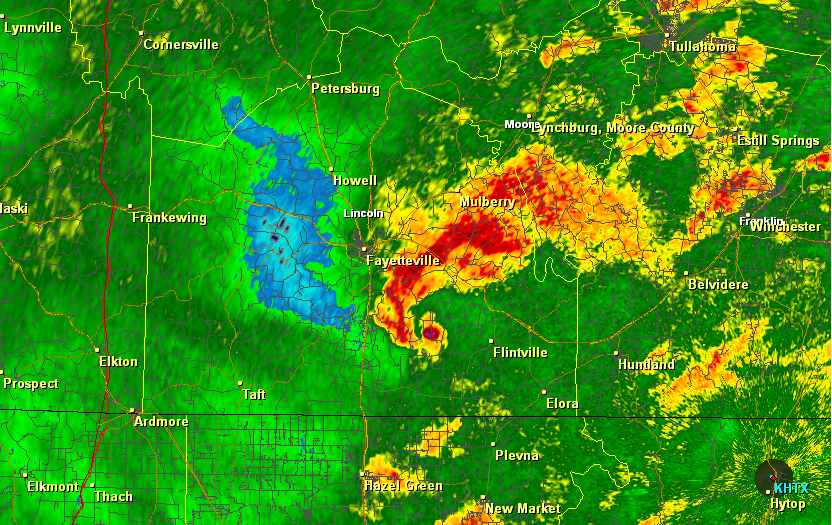
- NEXRAD radar scan of the Flintville, Tennessee EF3 tornado.

Meteorological history
- Formed: April 28, 2014, 8:09 p.m. CDT (UTC−05:00)
- Dissipated: April 28, 2014, 8:33 p.m. CDT (UTC−05:00)
- Duration: 24 minutes

EF3 tornado
- on the Enhanced Fujita scale
- Highest winds: 160 mph (260 km/h)

Overall effects
- Fatalities: 2
- Injuries: 0

At 8:09 p.m. CDT on April 28 (0109 UTC on April 29), a tornado touched down just north of the Alabama–Tennessee state line roughly 4 miles (6.4 km) southeast of Belleview, Tennessee. Initially, only trees were downed as the storm moved northeast; however, it soon began intensifying as it approached residential areas. It reached EF3 strength as it impacted a small community 5 miles (8.0 km) east-southeast of Flintville. Three homes were destroyed with only their interior walls left standing. A double-wide mobile home was obliterated here as well, with its undercarriage being thrown 125 yards (114 m) away. The two occupants of this home were killed. Continuing northeast, a poorly anchored home was almost completely leveled, with the debris being partially pushed off the foundation. Winds at this point were estimated to have peaked at 160 mph (260 km/h), ranking the tornado as a high-end EF3. The tornado then struck the South Lincoln Elementary school around 8:14 p.m. CDT (0114 UTC), destroying a large portion of its roof, and caused EF2 damage to two nearby homes. A school bus at the school was pushed 75 yards (69 m) into the front entrance of the building. The tornado maintained EF2 strength as it moved through a small housing development and continued to cause significant damage.

Maintaining EF2 intensity, the storm struck another small community at 8:19 p.m. CDT (0119 UTC). Here, mobile homes were blown off their foundations and completely destroyed. Some of the homes rolled up to 50 yards (46 m) before coming to a rest. At 8:22 p.m. CDT (0122 UTC), the tornado regained EF3 strength and toppled several metal high-tension truss towers. Two nearby homes were pushed completely off of their foundations. More noticeable weakening took place thereafter, with subsequent damage not exceeding EF1 levels. The tornado crossed US 64 around 8:25 p.m. CDT (0125 UTC) as it caused widespread tree damage. Although it had weakened, the tornado broadened to a width of 500 yd (460 m). Turning north-northeast, the storm crossed into southern Moore County, Tennessee several minutes later. Damage was mostly confined to trees, though several barns and a few single-family homes sustained moderate roof damage. The tornado ultimately dissipated at 8:33 p.m. CDT (0133 UTC) roughly 3 miles (4.8 km) southeast of Lynchburg. Overall, the tornado remained on the ground for 24 minutes and traveled 20.1 miles (32.3 km), killing two people along the way.

== Flood events ==
In northeastern Arkansas into southern Missouri, many areas received more than 3 in (76 mm) of rain during the evening hours of April 27, with a maximum of 7.6 in (190 mm) falling in near Batesville. Extensive flash flooding took place as a result and numerous roads were submerged. A bridge along Highway 25 was submerged in Independence County and part of the road was blocked by a mudslide near Desha. The Spring River rose to major flood level in Hardy and Imboden, as did the Eleven Point River at Ravenden Springs. In Missouri, Dunklin and New Madrid counties were hard-hit, with residents in Lilbourn being forced to evacuate.

Between April 28 and 30, two rounds of severe weather along the Alabama–Tennessee border resulted in significant flash flooding. Many areas received over 4 in (100 mm) in 48 hours, with some recording up to 6 in (150 mm). One of the supercell thunderstorms that produced deadly tornadoes in northern Alabama and southern Tennessee caused near-record flooding along the Big Wills Creek in Fort Payne, Alabama. The creek crested at 13.93 ft (4.25 m) early on April 29, just 5 in (13 cm) below its record high.

=== Mobile–Pensacola (April 29–30) ===
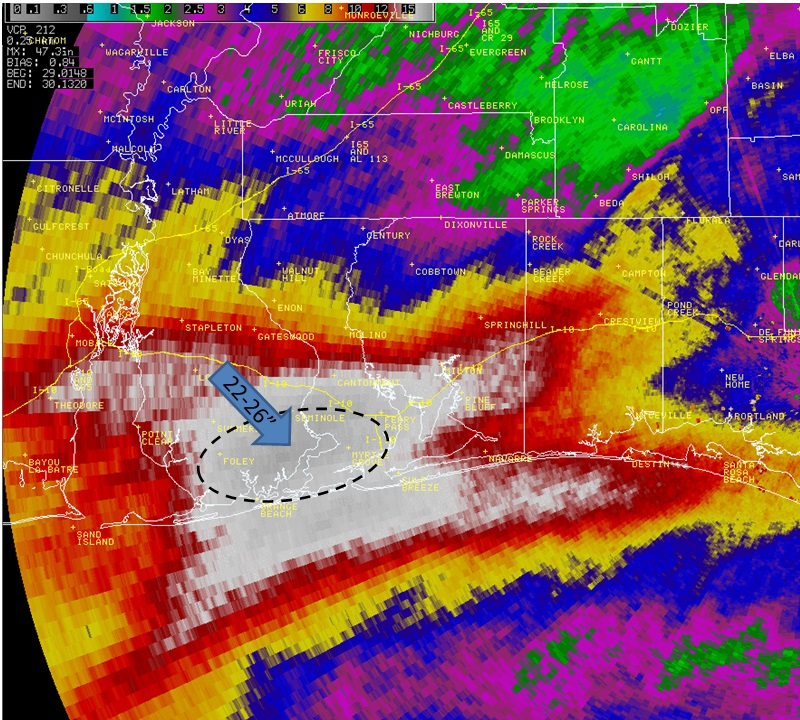
Radar estimated rainfall totals for the entire event from 8:48 p.m. CDT on April 28 to 9:20 a.m. CDT on April 30. Areas shaded in light-gray indicate precipitation totals in excess of 15 in (380 mm). The highlighted area denotes estimated totals of 22 to 26 in (560 to 660 mm).

During the evening hours of April 29, torrential rains affected parts of the Florida Panhandle and nearby Alabama. The region received between 15 and 20 in (380 and 510 mm) of rain that day and into early April 30, with locally higher totals. Widespread flash flooding took place in several counties, inundating homes and causing rivers to surge to near-record levels. In a 24-hour-span, roughly 22 in (560 mm) of rain fell in Pensacola, Florida, including 5.68 in (144 mm) an hour, prompting a flash flood emergency. This total accounted for roughly 33% of the city's annual rainfall. The official National Weather Service rain gauge for Pensacola, located at Pensacola Regional Airport, was struck by lightning and lost power during the event. Using radar data, meteorologists estimated that the station received 15.55 in (395 mm), marking the greatest single-day rainfall total on record at the site (records there go back to 1879). Numerous residents in motor vehicles were caught in the subsequent flooding. At least three hundred people were called to evacuate in the city. In the Woodbridge subdivision, a 20 ft (6.1 m) retaining wall collapsed and thousands of gallons of water flooded nearby areas. The rush of water severely damaged one home and left roads covered in debris. Across Escambia County, Florida, emergency crews were unable to respond to 9-1-1 calls as flood waters blocked off numerous roads. One person drowned in Pensacola after her car became submerged on a flooded road. In some areas, residents were forced to seek refuge in their attics as waters rose. Damage in Pensacola alone was estimated in excess of $100 million.

Across Okaloosa County, 200 mi (320 km) of paved roads and 150 mi (240 km) of dirt roads were damaged or washed away. A total of 170 homes were damaged by the floods, 100 of which were in Fort Walton. Significant damage took place at Hurlburt Field with several homes evacuated and 2,000 ft (610 m) of fencing in need of replacement. Twelve water pipes were also cracked or destroyed by sinkholes resulting from the flooding. At Eglin Air Force Base, 22 mi (35 km) of road was damaged of which 9 mi (14 km) was completely decimated. At least 12 bridges in the base were washed away or damaged. More than 350 homes sustained severe damage in Santa Rosa County, with monetary losses estimated in excess of $4.8 million.

In Gulf Shores, Alabama, 21 in (530 mm) of rain resulted in damage akin to hurricanes, with some residents claiming it to have been worse than Hurricane Ivan in 2004. Downtown Mobile was inundated and authorities used reverse 9-1-1 to warn residents of rising waters along the Fish River. The river ultimately crested at a record height of 23.18 ft (7.07 m) surpassing the previous peak of 22.78 ft (6.94 m) set during Hurricane Danny in July 1997. At least fifty people required rescue from their cars in the city. Baldwin County, Alabama emergency management director Mitchell Sims called the flooding "historical."

The extreme rainfall in Pensacola had a recurrence period of 1-in-100 to 1-in-200 years. The most notable aspect of the rainfall was the 5.68 in (144 mm) that fell in a single hour, which had a return frequency of 1-in-200 to 1-in-500 years. The event in Mobile, Alabama was slightly less significant, having a return period of 1-in-25 years.

Around 11:00 p.m. CDT on April 30, a natural gas explosion occurred at the Escambia County Central Booking and Detention Center, killing at least 2 people and injuring 185 others. The cause of the explosion is currently unknown, however, flooding from the storm had damaged the building earlier that day.

=== Mid-Atlantic states (April 29 – May 1) ===
As the storm complex slowly moved eastward, much of the Eastern United States was affected by steady, heavy rain, bringing the worst flooding in the region since Hurricane Irene. Particularly intense rains fell around the Washington metro and surrounding areas as more than a month worth of rain fell in 24 hours. The Aberdeen Proving Ground received the highest total of 7.57 in (192 mm) while many other areas reported more than 6 in (150 mm). In Washington, D.C. proper, measurements peaked at 4.74 in (120 mm). At Washington Dulles International Airport, 3.99 in (101 mm) fell on April 30, setting a record for the day and setting the wettest April on record. Up to 6.5 in (170 mm) fell in Baltimore, Maryland. Numerous roads around the region were temporarily closed due to flooding.

The Rocky Gorge Reservoir in Maryland swelled above its banks and threatened to collapse as water began seeping through joints in the Duckett Dam, eroding soil. In order to alleviate the risk of this, officials conducted a controlled release of the Dam and evacuated 200 nearby residents. Seven gates were opened late on April 30 to lower water levels while simultaneously flooding parts of Laurel. An inspection the following morning determined that the dam sustained no damage. The nearby Triadelphia Reservoir also had water released through the Brighton Dam. In Hyattsville, one family had to evacuate due to flooding. Two Washington Suburban Sanitary Commission waste water systems overflowed in Prince George's County. In the Charles Village neighborhood of Baltimore, a street collapsed along an embankment above a CSX rail line, covering the tracks and taking several cars with it. No buildings were damaged by the collapse but residents in nearby homes were ordered to evacuate until inspections determined if it was safe to stay there.

The entirety of the Delaware River's watershed experienced flooding of varying degrees due to the storm. The Brandywine Creek in Delaware rose to 4 ft (1.2 m) above flood-stage, inundating nearby areas and closing numerous roads. The river also flowed at 14.3 billion gallons per day near Chadds Ford, Pennsylvania, the third-highest on record. Downstream, a gauge near Brandywine Park broke well-before peak flows reached the area. Several families along the river were evacuated due to rising waters. The White Clay Creek, a tributary to the Brandywine Creek, reached its fourth-highest flow on record at 9.44 billion gallons per day. Additionally, the Red Clay Creek crested at its sixth-highest level on record. Throughout Delaware, 81 road accidents related to the rain took place, with 11 resulting in injuries.

A landslide in Yonkers, New York, south of the Glenwood station, interfered with Metro-North's Hudson Line, blocking two tracks and causing delays. New York City saw exactly 5.00 inches (127 mm) of rain, and a landslide developed in Port Washington. Due to the heavy rain, both the New York Yankees and New York Mets had to postpone their games until the next day. Just before 4am on May 1, a person died due to a car crash on the ramp between Interstate 495 and Interstate 295 in Queens, but it is unknown if the floods were the cause of the crash.

== Aftermath ==
Prior to the arrival of severe storms, a state of emergency was declared for Alabama, Florida, Georgia, and Tennessee on April 28. In Alabama, 100 National Guard troops were placed on standby to assist communities. Following destructive tornadoes later that day, a state of emergency was also declared for Mississippi. State Medical Assistance Teams were deployed to Tupelo and Winston County while a resupply truck was sent to Winston County. Additionally, a public shelter was opened in Lee County. Ottawa County, Oklahoma was later placed under a state of emergency as well.

On April 29, Faulkner County, Arkansas, was declared a federal disaster area by President Barack Obama. This allowed residents to receive federal aid and low-cost loans to cover uninsured losses.

In the wake of the severe flooding in Florida, Governor Rick Scott declared a state of emergency for 26 counties. The Florida National Guard, equipped with high-water rescue vehicles, was deployed to the Panhandle region early on April 30. Additionally, the Florida Fish and Wildlife Commission provided thirty-one road vehicles and thirteen boats to assist. A local state of emergency was also declared in Escambia County. Throughout the county, all schools and businesses were closed and only essential personnel were to report to work. Emergency officials urged all residents to stay home and not call 9-1-1 unless they had a life-threatening emergency. A Red Cross shelter was opened in Pensacola to house displaced residents. Similarly, local emergencies were raised in Walton and Washington counties as well as the cities of Crestview and Destin.

On April 30, freight rail on the CSX line north from Baltimore was interrupted, perhaps for days, when an unstable retaining wall in the Charles Village section of the city collapsed, sending several automobiles off the road into the railway gully.

== See also ==
- Weather of 2014
- List of disasters in the United States by death toll
- List of North American tornadoes and tornado outbreaks
- List of F4 and EF4 tornadoes
  - List of F4 and EF4 tornadoes (2010–2019)
- Tornado records
- Tornado outbreak and floods of April 28 – May 1, 2017
