= Tornadoes of 2014 =

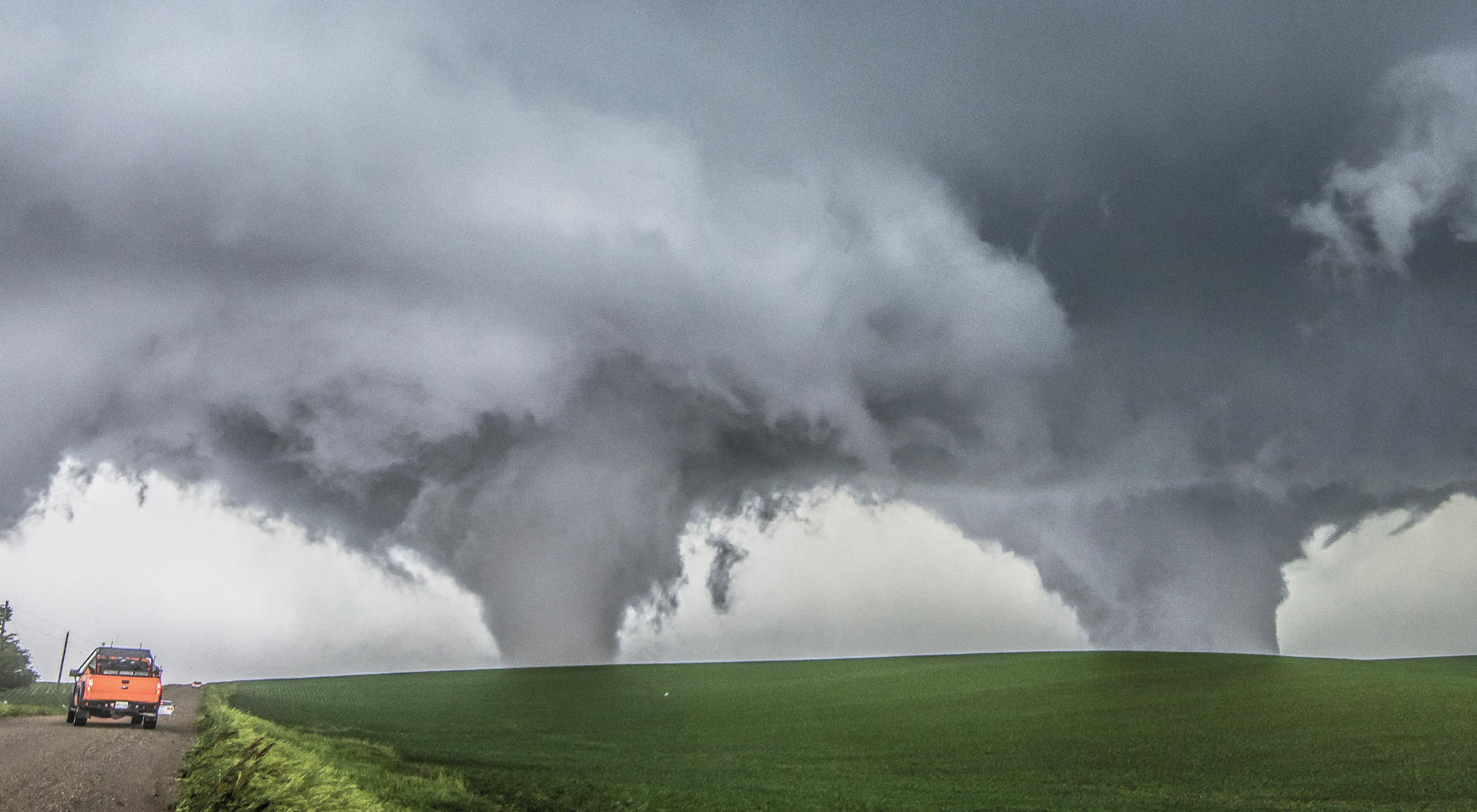
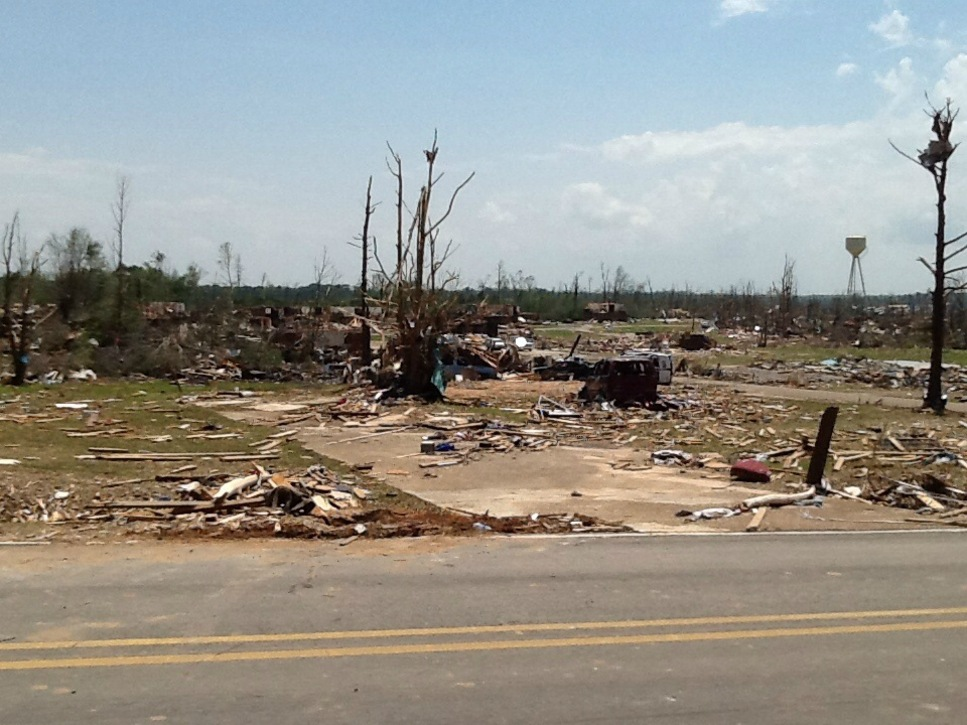
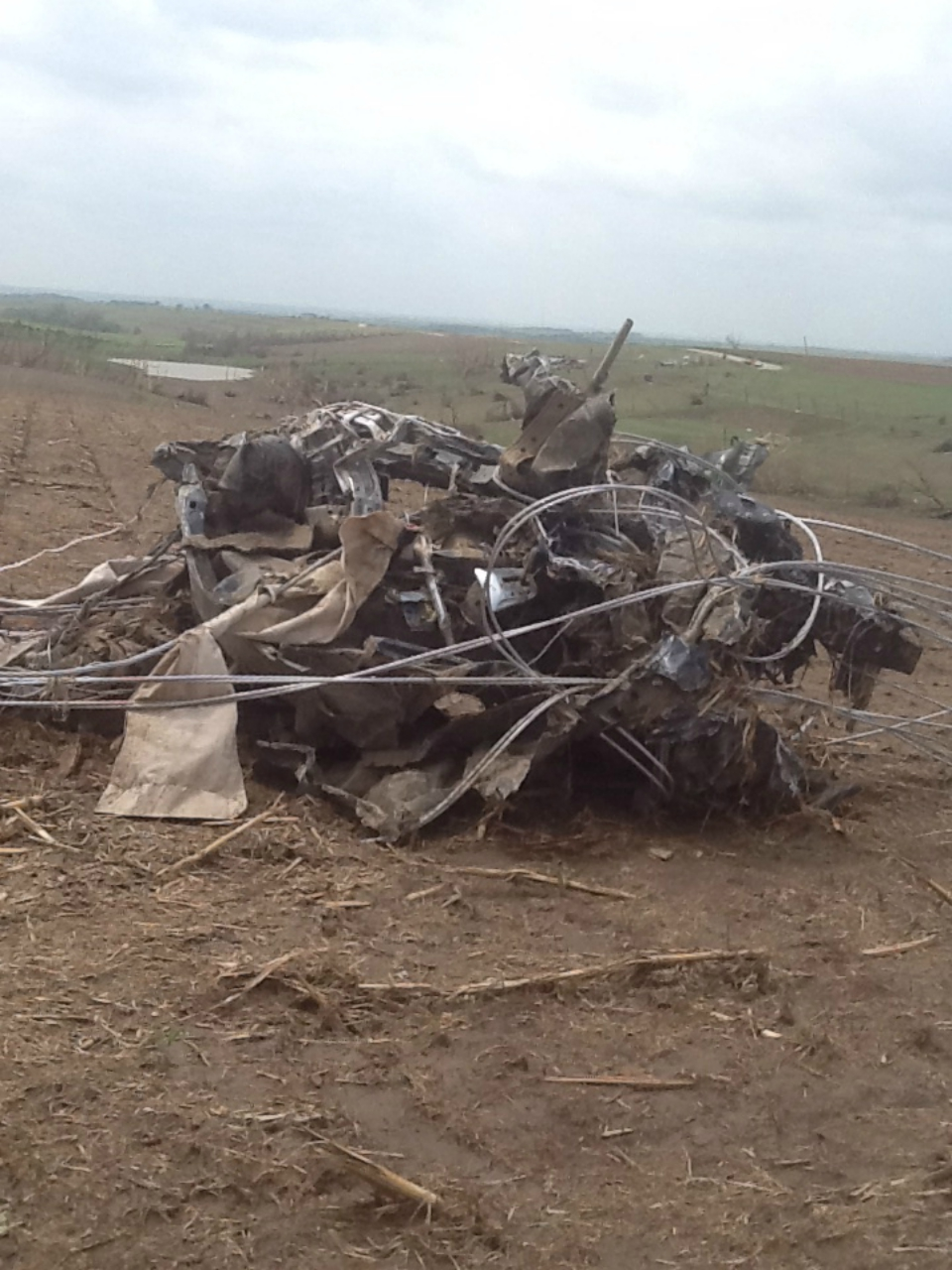
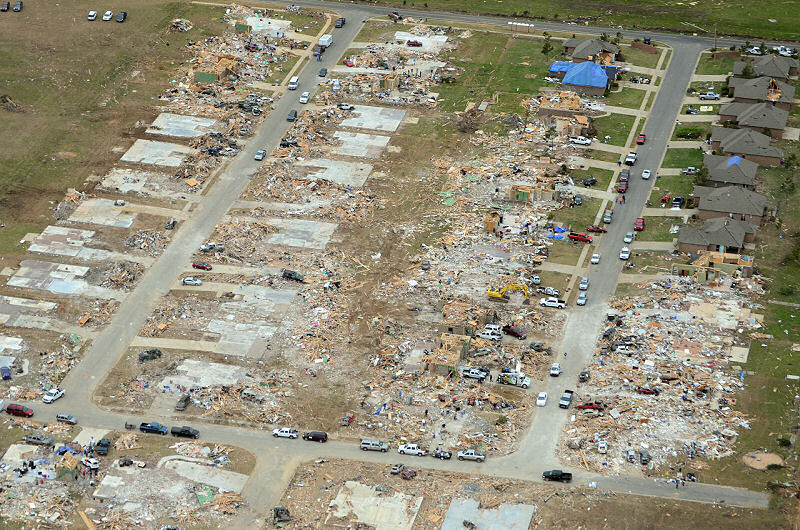
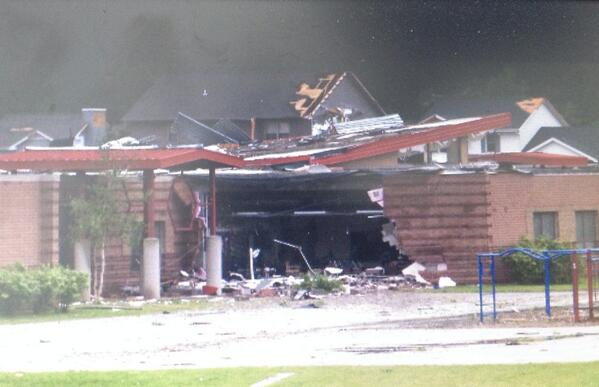
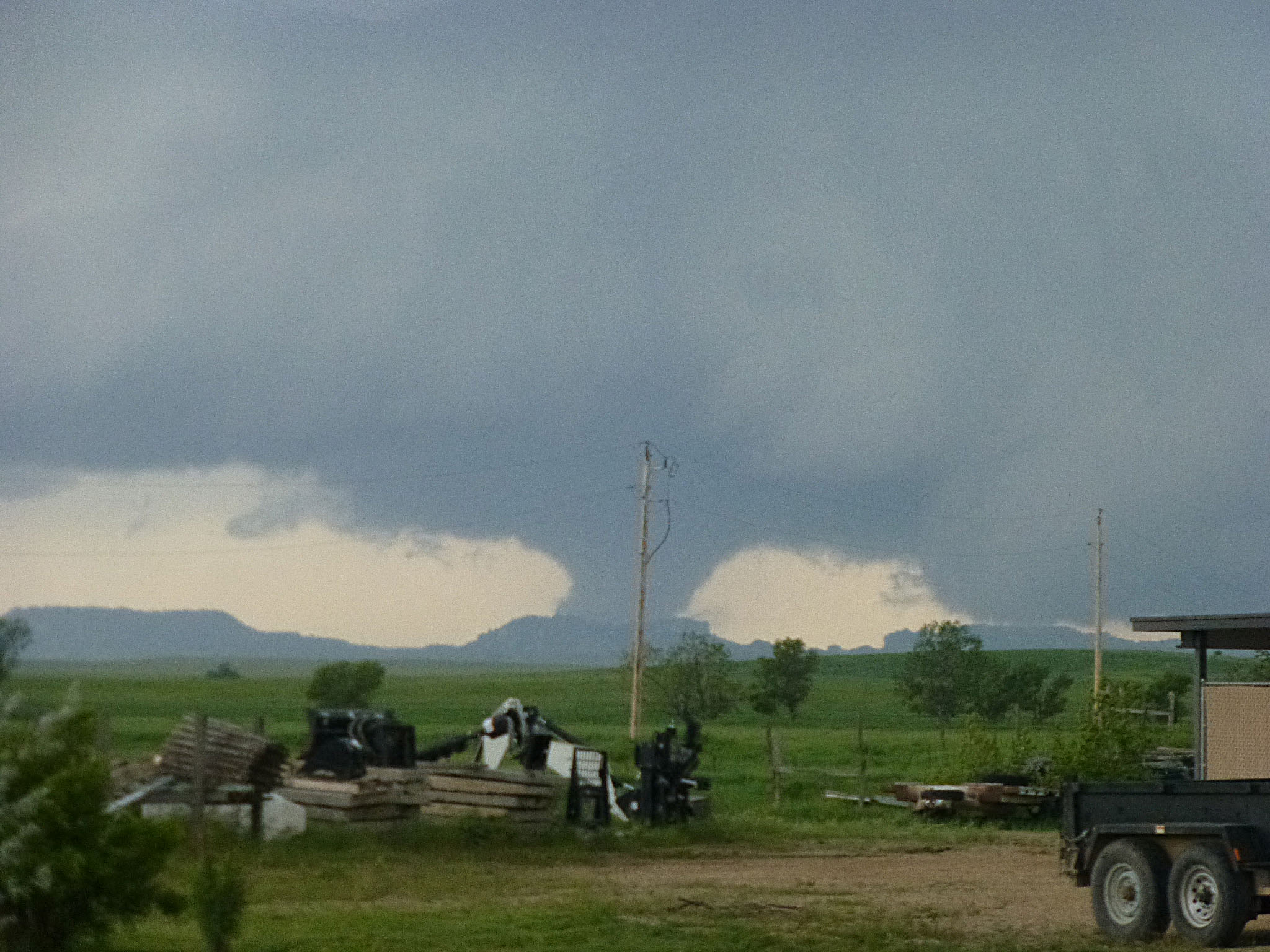
- Clockwise from top: Twin EF4 tornadoes near Pilger, Nebraska on June 16; A mangled car following an EF4 tornado near Stanton, Nebraska on June 16; Damage to a school in Verona, Wisconsin after an EF3 tornado on June 17; A large EF3 tornado in rural southeastern Montana on June 17; Aerial view of EF4 damage to a subdivision in Vilonia, Arkansas following a tornado on April 27; EF4 damage to structures in Louisville, Mississippi following a tornado on April 28.
- Timespan: January 11 – December 29, 2014
- Maximum rated tornado: EF4 tornado: List; Mayflower–Vilonia, Arkansas on April 27; Louisville, Mississippi on April 28; Stanton, Nebraska on June 16; Pilger, Nebraska on June 16; Pilger, Nebraska on June 16; Wakefield, Nebraska on June 16; Alpena, South Dakota on June 18; Khashaat, Mongolia (F4) on July 26
- Tornadoes in U.S.: 929
- Damage (U.S.): $635.475 million
- Fatalities (U.S.): 48
- Fatalities (worldwide): 88

This page documents the tornadoes and tornado outbreaks of 2014. Strong and destructive tornadoes form most frequently in the United States, Bangladesh, Brazil, and Eastern India, but they can occur almost anywhere under the right conditions. Tornadoes also appear regularly in neighboring southern Canada during the Northern Hemisphere's summer season, and somewhat regularly in Europe, Asia, and Australia.

There were at least 929 tornadoes confirmed in the United States in 2014. 88 fatalities have been confirmed worldwide in 2014: 48 in the United States, 20 in Bangladesh, 15 in Brazil, two in Australia and Russia, and one in Mongolia.

== Synopsis ==
Early 2014 featured several strong cold waves that settled across the United States and kept severe weather suppressed. However, severe weather did develop on January 11 after temperatures moderated, and four EF0 tornadoes were confirmed–three in Virginia and one in Georgia. The rest of the month, along with the first half of February, was very quiet in terms of severe weather. Another intrusion of warm air allowed instability to develop in mid-February, and 41 tornadoes touched down across the lower Midwest and the Southeast U.S. on February 21 and 22. Four of these were strong enough to be rated EF2 on the Enhanced Fujita scale.

The rest of February and most of March was quiet, with only weak tornadoes touching down in Arizona, Florida, and California. However, activity picked up on March 27, with several tornadoes touching down across Missouri and Iowa in association with a cold front. The general trend of low activity continued through most of April with only a few small outbreaks occurring; however, the trend ended with a major outbreak that started on April 27 producing multiple strong tornadoes across the Great Plains and the South and killing 35 people, 16 of which came from an EF4 tornado in Arkansas.

After the deadly April 27 - 30 tornado outbreak, May and June saw above average tornado counts from several significant tornado outbreaks, while July saw an average number of tornadoes. The remainder of the year saw average to below average tornado activity, but a moderate tornado outbreak in mid-October pushed tornado coverage to above average for that month. December saw the first tornado in the city of Los Angeles, California as part of a winter storm system.

As a result, 2014 ended well below average for tornadoes, with only 929 tornadoes total, like the previous 2 years.

== Events ==
=== United States ===
Confirmed tornadoes by Enhanced Fujita rating
EFU	EF0	EF1	EF2	EF3	EF4	EF5	Total
0	510	321	71	20	7	0	929

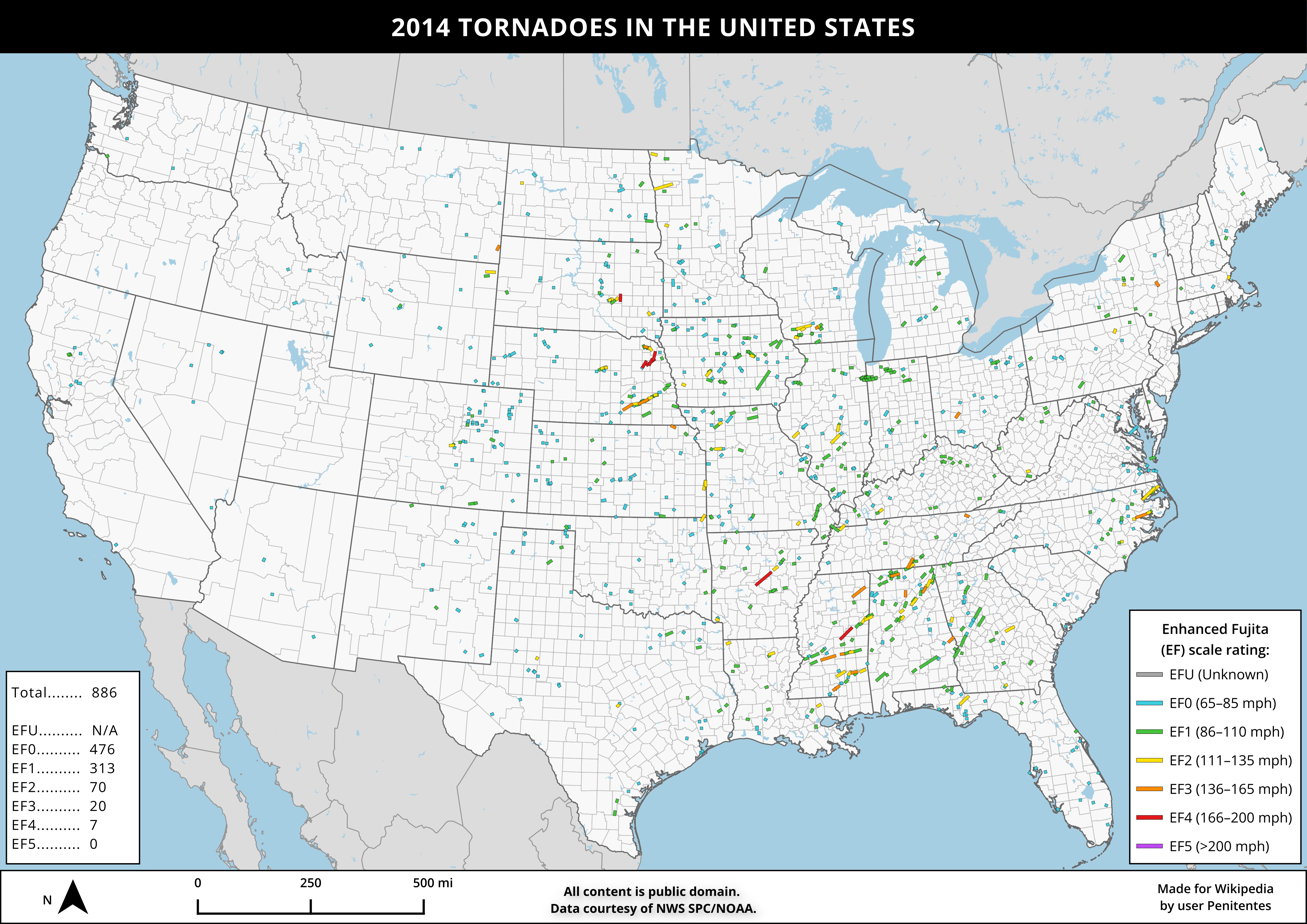
A map of 2014 United States tornado paths from the results of storm surveys.

A chart of the 2014 United States tornado count estimated from the number of preliminary reports

Fatal tornadoes in the United States in 2014
- Approximate touchdown location of killer tornadoes in 2014 Summary of tornadoes: April 25 – North Carolina (1 death); April 27 – Iowa (2 deaths); April 27 – Oklahoma (1 death); April 27 – Arkansas (16 deaths); April 28 – Mississippi (1 death); April 28 – Mississippi (10 deaths); April 28 – Alabama (2 deaths); April 28 – Mississippi (1 death); April 28 – Tennessee (2 deaths); June 16 – Nebraska (1 death); June 16 – Nebraska (1 death); July 8 – New York (4 deaths); October 13 – Arkansas (1 death); December 23 – Mississippi (2 deaths); December 23 – Mississippi (3 deaths); Total fatalities: 48

== January ==
=== January 25 (Europe) ===
FU	F0	F1	F2	F3	F4	F5
0	0	10	1	0	0	0

An outbreak of mostly weak tornadoes affected Europe on January 25, with the event beginning in the United Kingdom. The first tornado touched down near the village of Llangwyryfon in Wales, downing trees, tossing a cattle feeder, and earning an F1(T2) rating. Another F1 tornado struck the Ordsall area of Manchester, England, where 50 homes sustained damage to their roofs, chimneys, and TV antennas. Lamps posts and trees were also downed by the tornado. A tornado also caused F1 damage to sheds near Upper Wield, while another F1 struck Nuneaton, where roughly 30 homes had roof tiles and garage roofs blown off, and five of these homes were heavily damaged. Three other F1 tornadoes also occurred in and around Chobham, Acton, and Harlow, England, causing damage to roofs and trees. In Turkey, an F1 tornado also hit Avsallar and caused roof damage to multiple homes, a few of which sustained partial roof loss. Additional tornadoes touched down across parts of France later that day, the strongest of which was an F2(T4) that was on the ground for 12.8 km and caused considerable damage in the town of Halluin, injuring three people. A shopping center and 90 homes were damaged by the Halluin tornado. A few other weak F1 tornadoes were also confirmed, including one that damaged the roofs of homes in Isbergues, and another that hit the village of Aubencheul-aux-Bois, damaging trees, homes, signs, and an embroidery workshop. A tornado caused F1 damage in the Wingene, Belgium area as well, and 11 tornadoes were confirmed as a result of this outbreak.

== February ==
=== February 20–21 (United States) ===
EFU	EF0	EF1	EF2	EF3	EF4	EF5
0	20	19	4	0	0	0

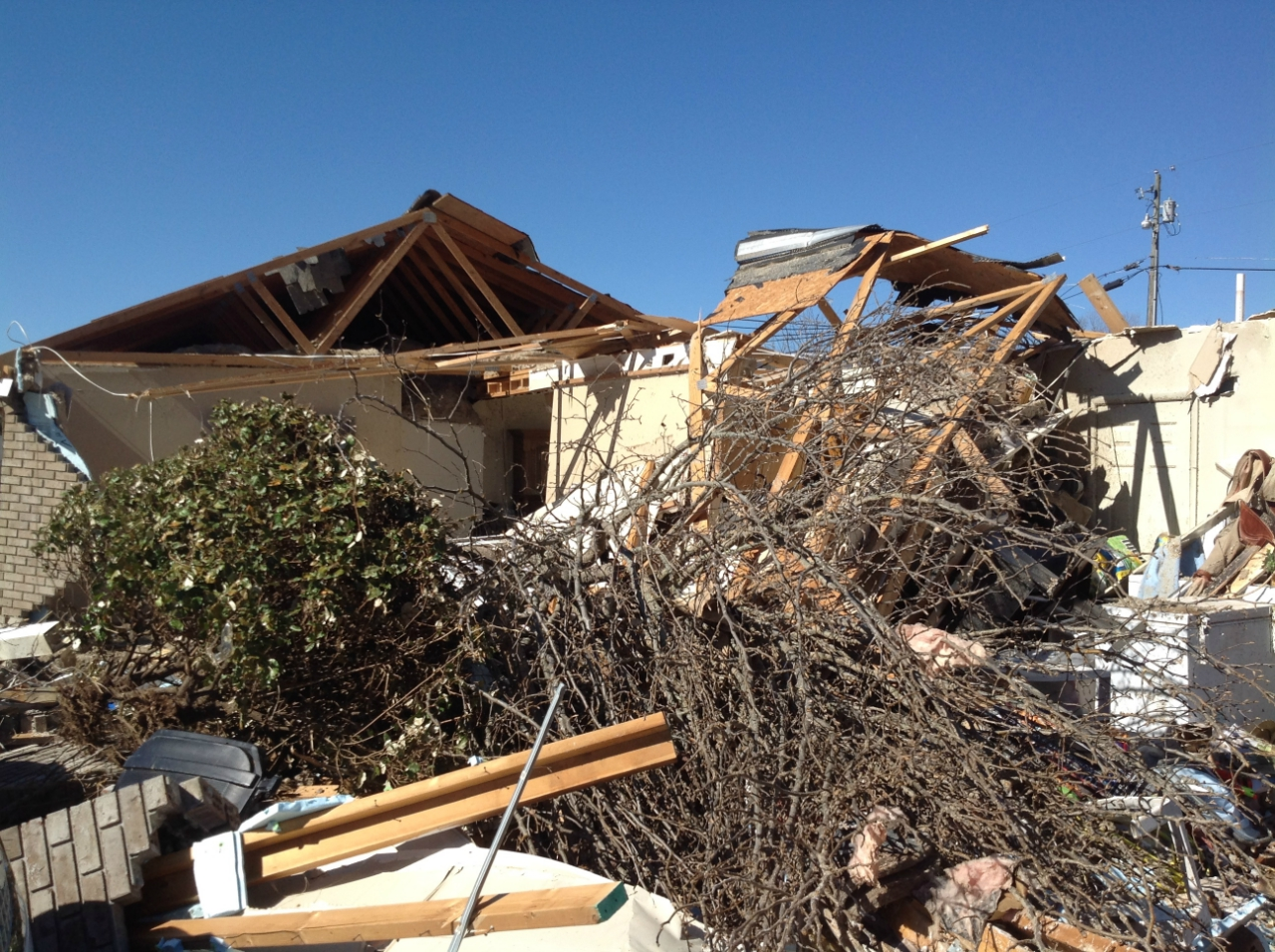
High-end EF2 damage to a house in Fort Payne, Alabama.

A large shortwave trough progressed across the northern Plains on February 20, with an associated surface low-pressure area contributing to a blizzard across Michigan and Wisconsin. Within the warm sector of the cyclone, modest instability and moisture, as well as sufficient forcing along a cold front, initiated the development of a squall line across the Ohio River Valley and Mississippi River Valley by the afternoon. Strong wind shear led to widespread damaging wind reports in addition to over two dozen tornadoes across the Midwestern and Southern United States, four of which were rated EF2 on the Enhanced Fujita scale. The first two EF2s affected rural areas in Illinois near the towns of Martinsburg and Pana, damaging several farms.

The squall line continued to push eastward into the Mid-Atlantic states on February 21, leading to numerous damaging wind reports and several tornadoes from Georgia to Maryland. A brief but strong EF2 clipped the northeast side of Fort Payne, Alabama, causing significant damage to a factory, an apartment complex, and some homes. Another EF2 struck Dublin, Georgia, and destroyed one home, damaged 59 others, and downed numerous trees. Overall, this moderate outbreak produced 43 tornadoes and no fatalities.

== March ==
=== March 25–29 (United States) ===
EFU	EF0	EF1	EF2	EF3	EF4	EF5
0	8	4	2	0	0	0

A low pressure system tracked across the United States, producing tornadoes across California, Missouri, and across southern portions of the Eastern Seaboard. In Northern California, several brief tornadoes touched down, uprooting trees and causing minor damage. In Northern Missouri, a supercell thunderstorm produced a strong EF2 tornado, which caused heavy roof and wall damage to a farmstead near Jameson, Missouri. Another EF2 occurred in Grundy County which heavily damaged several residences near Tindall. The storm system continued east over the next few days, producing several weak and short-lived tornadoes in Florida and North Carolina.

== April ==
=== April 6–7 (United States) ===
EFU	EF0	EF1	EF2	EF3	EF4	EF5
0	2	4	2	0	0	0

Severe thunderstorms moved across portions of the Southern United States, producing at least eight confirmed tornadoes. An EF2 tornado destroyed mobile homes and damaged other structures in and around Hot Coffee, Mississippi. Another EF2 tornado caused significant damage in the area of Pantego, North Carolina, where homes were damaged and destroyed. Two people were injured when the truck they were in was thrown 50 yards (46 m).

=== April 12 (Brazil) ===
FU	F0	F1	F2	F3	F4	F5
0	0	1	1	0	0	0

Two tornadoes touched down in the state of Rio Grande do Sul. An F2 tornado struck Erebango and Tapejara, damaging 300 houses and killing one person. Another tornado, which was rated F1, touched down in Soledade and caused considerable tree damage.

=== April 25 (North Carolina) ===
EFU	EF0	EF1	EF2	EF3	EF4	EF5
0	4	3	3	1	0	0

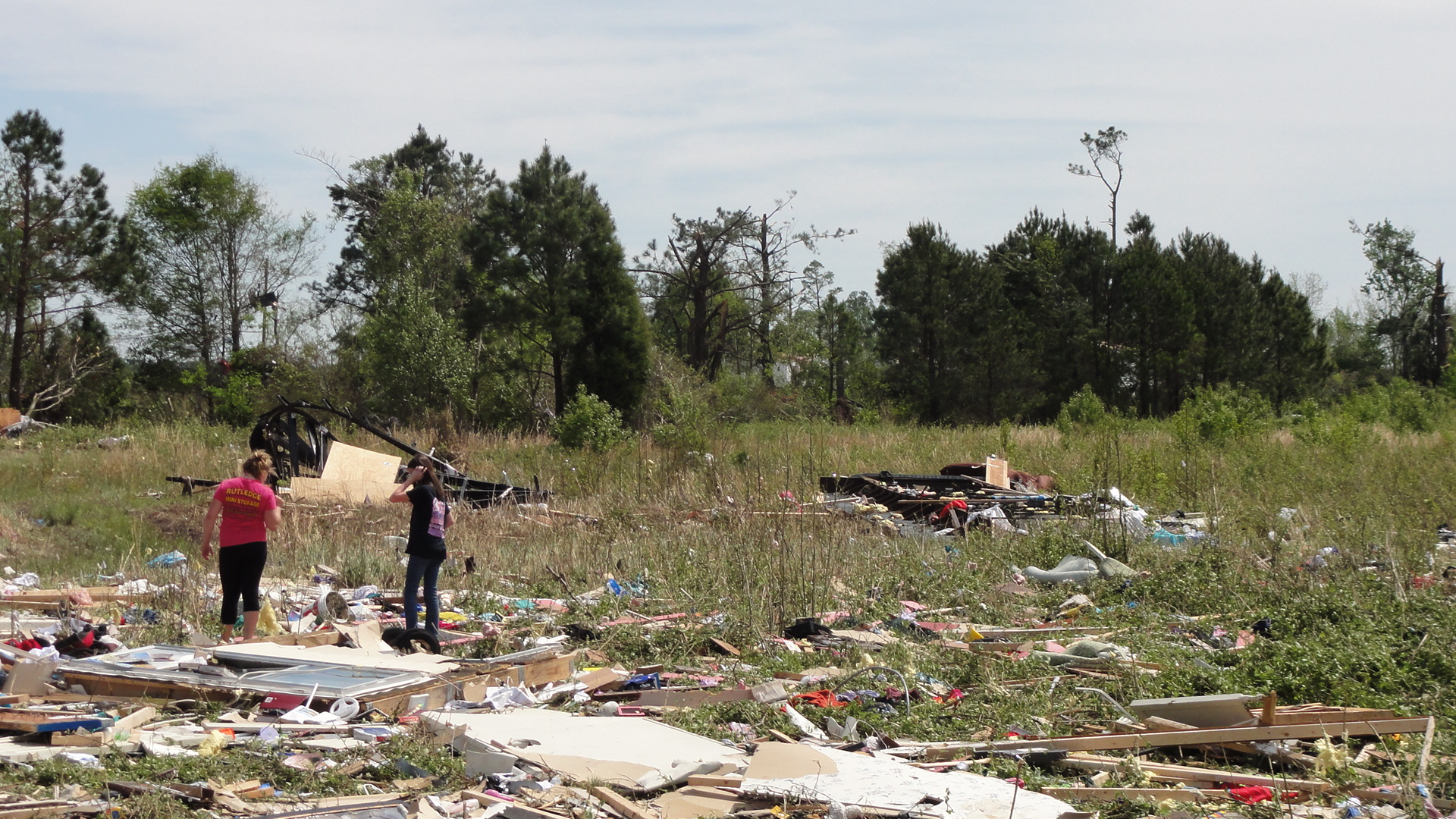
The undercarriages of two mobile homes that were destroyed south of Washington, North Carolina

In advance of a compact shortwave trough and associated cold front, numerous severe thunderstorms developed across central and eastern North Carolina into southern Virginia. An EF3 tornado tracked near Washington, North Carolina, through the Whichards Beach area, across the Pamlico River from Washington, then crossing the Pamlico River and hitting Washington Park, then hitting the intersection of US 264 and NC 32, then leaving the area, damaging or destroying 200 homes and injuring 16 people. This event marks the latest time of formation of the first EF3+ tornado in any year on record. An EF2 in Edenton resulted in a fatality, the first of the year in the United States.

=== April 27–30 (United States) ===
EFU	EF0	EF1	EF2	EF3	EF4	EF5
0	18	37	16	9	2	0

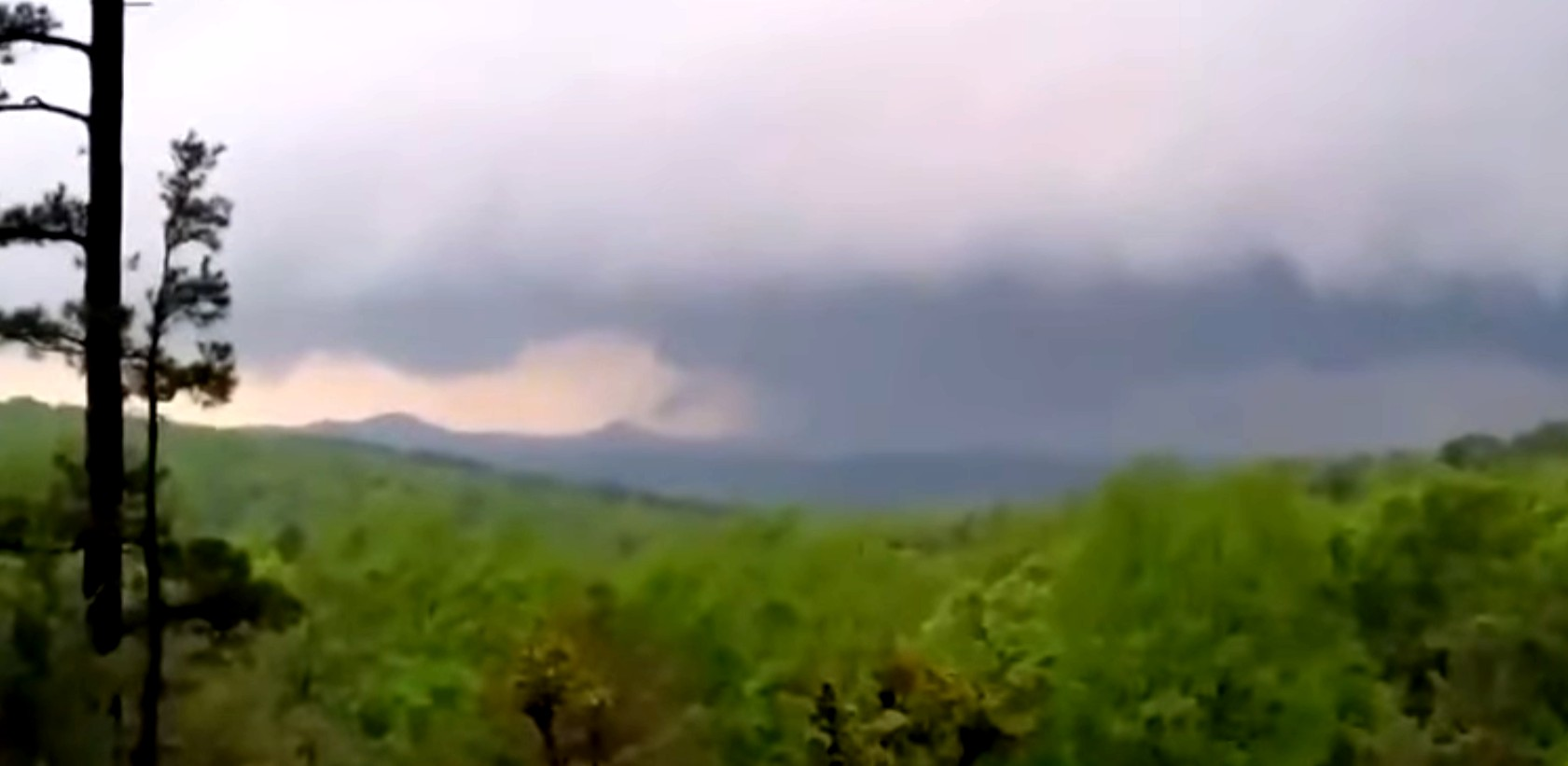
A large EF4 tornado seen near Maumelle, Arkansas on April 27.

A devastating outbreak of tornadoes ripped across parts of Mississippi, Alabama, Tennessee, Iowa, Nebraska, Missouri, Kansas, Oklahoma, Arkansas and Florida in late April 2014. The event began on April 27, as multiple intense tornadoes touched down across parts of the Midwest, Ozarks, and Great Plains. A strong EF2 tornado struck Quapaw, Oklahoma and Baxter Springs, Kansas, resulting in one fatality, 37 injuries, and severe damage in both towns. An EF1 tornado destroyed multiple outbuildings, killing two people as it passed near Martinsburg, Iowa. A large, violent wedge tornado struck Mayflower and Vilonia, Arkansas later that evening, causing catastrophic damage and killing 16 people as numerous homes and businesses were obliterated, some of which were swept completely away. Trees were completely denuded and debarked, vehicles were thrown and mangled beyond recognition by the tornado, which was rated a high-end EF4, the first violent tornado of the year.

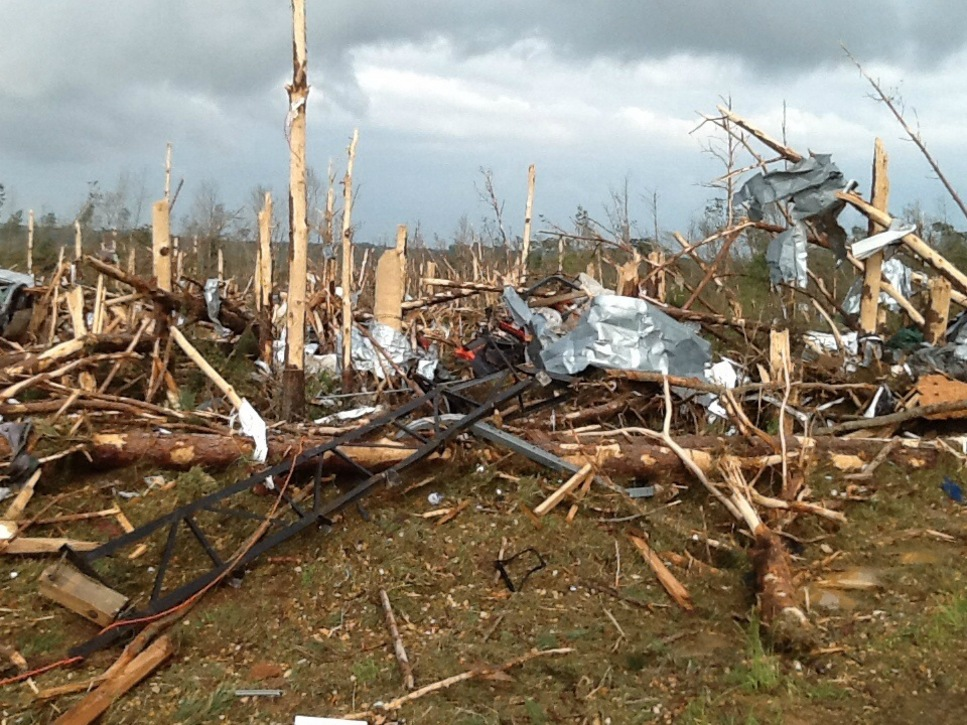
Extreme EF4-level tree damage near Louisville, Mississippi.

Destructive tornadoes continued to touch down on April 28, and 10 people were killed when an EF4 tornado struck Louisville, Mississippi, where many homes, apartment buildings, and businesses were completely destroyed, some of which were leveled or swept away. An EF3 tornado caused one fatality and major damage to many structures in Tupelo, Mississippi as well, and another EF3 struck Coxey, Alabama, destroying a mobile home park and killing two people. Numerous other strong tornadoes occurred in rural areas of the Deep South later that night and into the early morning of April 29. Additional weak tornadoes touched down in The Carolinas and Florida on April 29 and 30 before the outbreak came to an end. 82 tornadoes were confirmed as a result of this outbreak, which resulted in 35 fatalities.

== May ==
=== May 10–12 (United States) ===
EFU	EF0	EF1	EF2	EF3	EF4	EF5
0	24	12	6	2	0	0

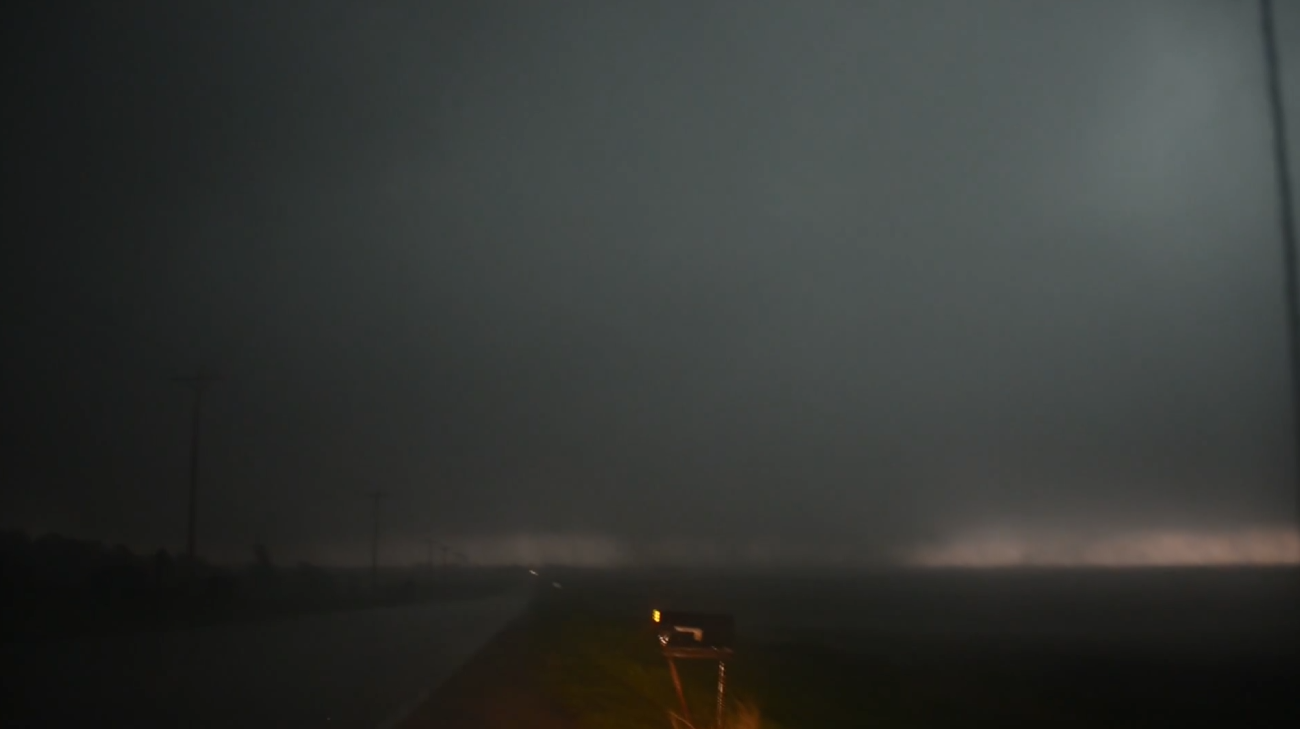
An EF3 tornado passing east of Clay Center, Nebraska on May 11.

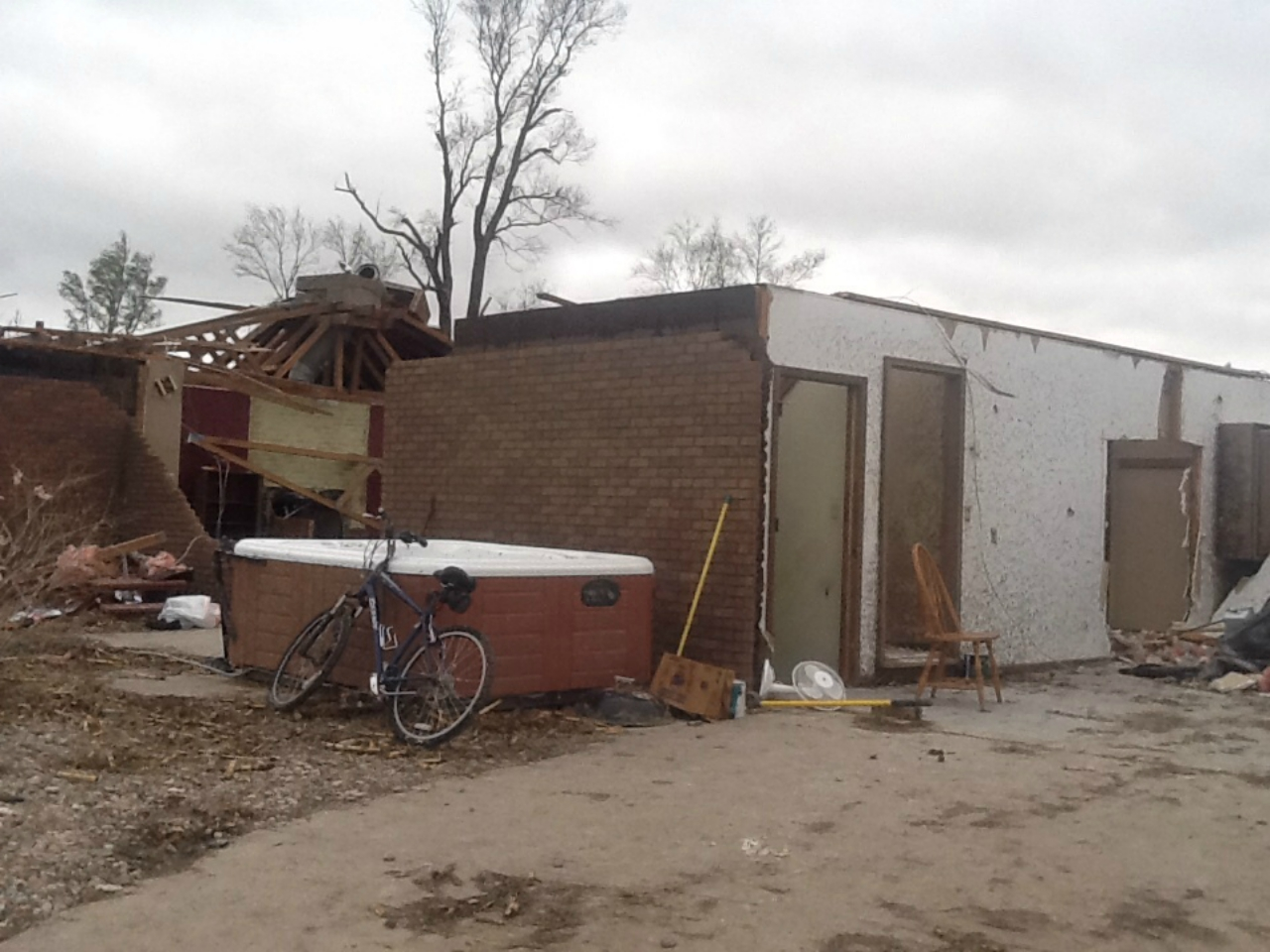
Farmhouse that was leveled by a large EF3 tornado near Cordova, Nebraska.

A moderate outbreak of 44 tornadoes impacted the central United States in early May 2014. On May 10, numerous supercell thunderstorms developed across Missouri in advance of an intensifying upper-level low over the Great Basin. One supercell spawned a damaging EF2 tornado that moved through downtown Orrick, Missouri, causing significant damage but no fatalities. 80% of the structures in Orrick were damaged, and the school sustained major damage and lost much of its roof. On May 11, the upper-level low continued eastward into the Plains, providing ample wind shear for tornadoes; in preparation for the event, the Storm Prediction Center issued a Moderate risk for severe weather. Numerous thunderstorms developed across the Midwest – particularly Kansas, Nebraska, and Iowa – spawning many tornadoes. A large multiple-vortex EF3 tornado passed near the town of Sutton, Nebraska, causing considerable damage to farm properties and flattening an unanchored farmhouse. Powerful rear flank downdraft winds spawned by the parent supercell severely damaged downtown Sutton. Another very large rain-wrapped EF3 wedge tornado passed near the town of Cordova, Nebraska, destroying multiple farmhouses and spawning multiple satellite tornadoes, before making a direct hit on Beaver Crossing. Structures in the village were damaged or destroyed by the EF3 tornado. Two separate tornadoes; rated EF2 and EF1, also caused severe damage near the town of Raymond. Numerous other less significant tornadoes touched down in Nebraska and other states that evening as well. Later that night, an EF2 tornado largely destroyed a lakeside condominium building near Yale, Iowa. Two weak EF0 tornadoes touched down in northern Ohio on May 12 before the outbreak came to an end.

=== May 14–16 (United States) ===
EFU	EF0	EF1	EF2	EF3	EF4	EF5
0	8	3	1	1	0	0

Severe thunderstorms moved across portions of the eastern United States with multiple reports of tornadoes. Two significant tornadoes touched down on May 14. The first, rated EF2, damaged several homes and destroyed two barns northeast of Hopkinsville, Kentucky. An EF3 tornado caused substantial damage near Cedarville, Ohio, destroying several barns and a farmhouse.

=== May 22 (United States) ===
EFU	EF0	EF1	EF2	EF3	EF4	EF5
0	0	1	0	1	0	0

The Storm Prediction Center outlined a slight risk for severe weather across portions of the Mid-Atlantic, including a 2% tornado risk. However, an EF3 tornado moved across portions of Schenectady and Albany counties in New York. The worst damage occurred in Duanesburg, where one house was almost completely destroyed. This marks the strongest tornado in the state of New York since May 31, 1998. Another tornado, rated EF1, touched down near Marydel, Delaware.

=== May 23 (Philippines) ===
A Tornado accompanied by a hailstorm struck Cauayan, Isabela where it damaged houses and toppled a concrete wall, which led to 2 people being killed.

== June ==
=== June 3–4 (United States) ===
EFU	EF0	EF1	EF2	EF3	EF4	EF5
0	6	5	1	1	0	0

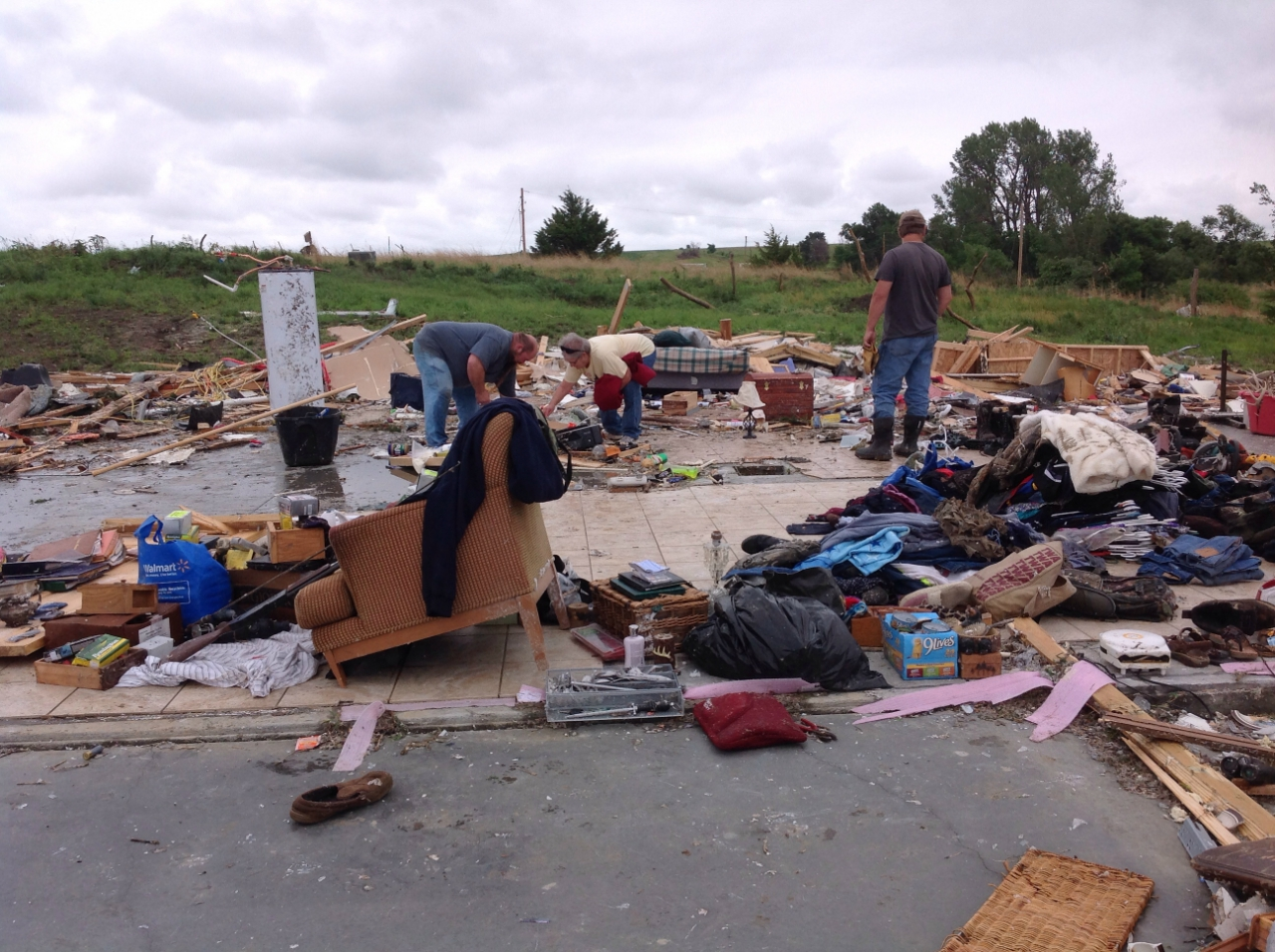
The poorly anchored/constructed home swept away at low-end EF3 intensity in Nemaha County, Kansas.

On June 3, the Storm Prediction Center issued a high risk outlook for parts of the Great Plains, mainly due to a significant risk of damaging winds, although a risk of very large hail and strong tornadoes was outlined. Hail up to the size of golfballs and wind gusts ranging from 60-80 mph (96 km-128 km) were reported. Some flooding also occurred with total rain amounts ranging from 1-3 inches(25.4mm-76.2mm). A few tornadoes occurred as well, including an EF3 tornado that leveled a poorly constructed home near Bern, Kansas. An EF2 tornado caused damage to farm structures near Oakland, Iowa, as well. The next day, the system produced seven additional weak tornadoes across the Midwest, resulting in minor damage.

=== June 10 (South Korea) ===
A rare F0 tornado in the Goyang injured several people and destroyed approximately 20 greenhouses. It was the first ever documented supercell tornado in Korea.

=== June 16–18 (United States) ===
EFU	EF0	EF1	EF2	EF3	EF4	EF5
0	32	24	12	3	5	0

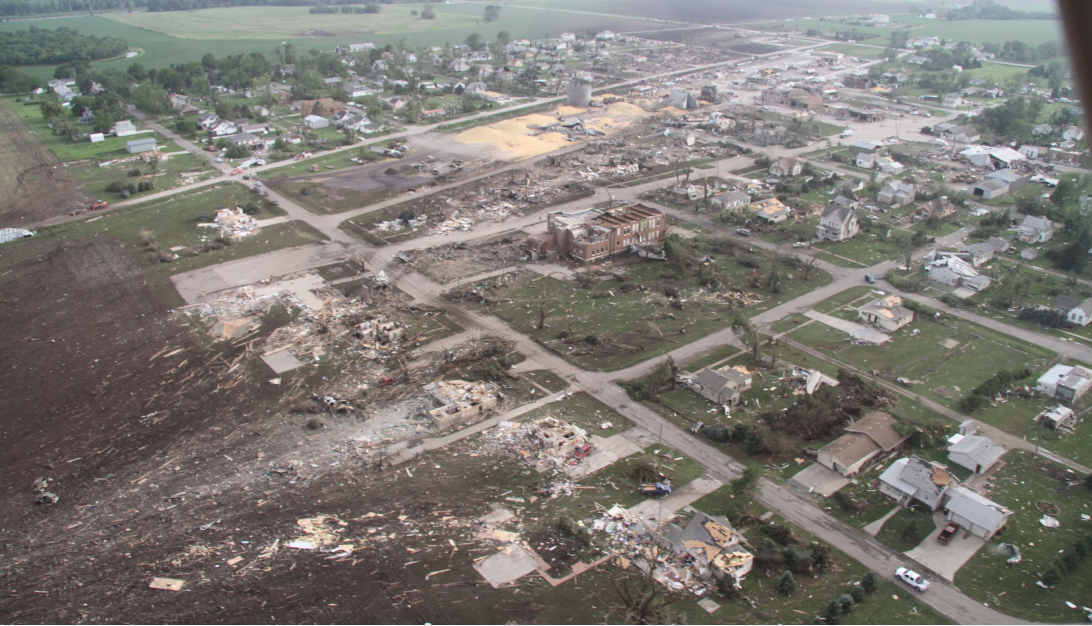
Aerial view of EF4 damage in Pilger, Nebraska.

A significant tornado outbreak occurred across parts of the United States and Canada in mid-June 2014, with destructive tornadoes touching down across parts of Nebraska, Wisconsin, South Dakota, Montana, and Ontario. The event began on June 16, when a cyclic supercell thunderstorm produced a violent EF4 tornado that devastated the small town of Pilger, Nebraska. A school, a church, and numerous homes were destroyed in Pilger, one person was killed, and 16 others were critically injured in town. An identical EF4 tornado paralleled the path of the main Pilger tornado and caused a fatality in a vehicle, caused major damage to farmsteads, and debarked many trees. The same parent supercell also produced two other large EF4 tornadoes that passed near the towns of Stanton and Wakefield, sweeping away multiple farm homes and lofting vehicles for hundreds of yards through the air. The town of Platteville, Wisconsin was hit by a damaging EF2 tornado later that evening, while an EF1 tornado also moved through another part of town simultaneously. Significant damage to homes, an apartment building, the University of Wisconsin–Platteville campus, a gas station, power lines, and many trees occurred throughout Platteville.

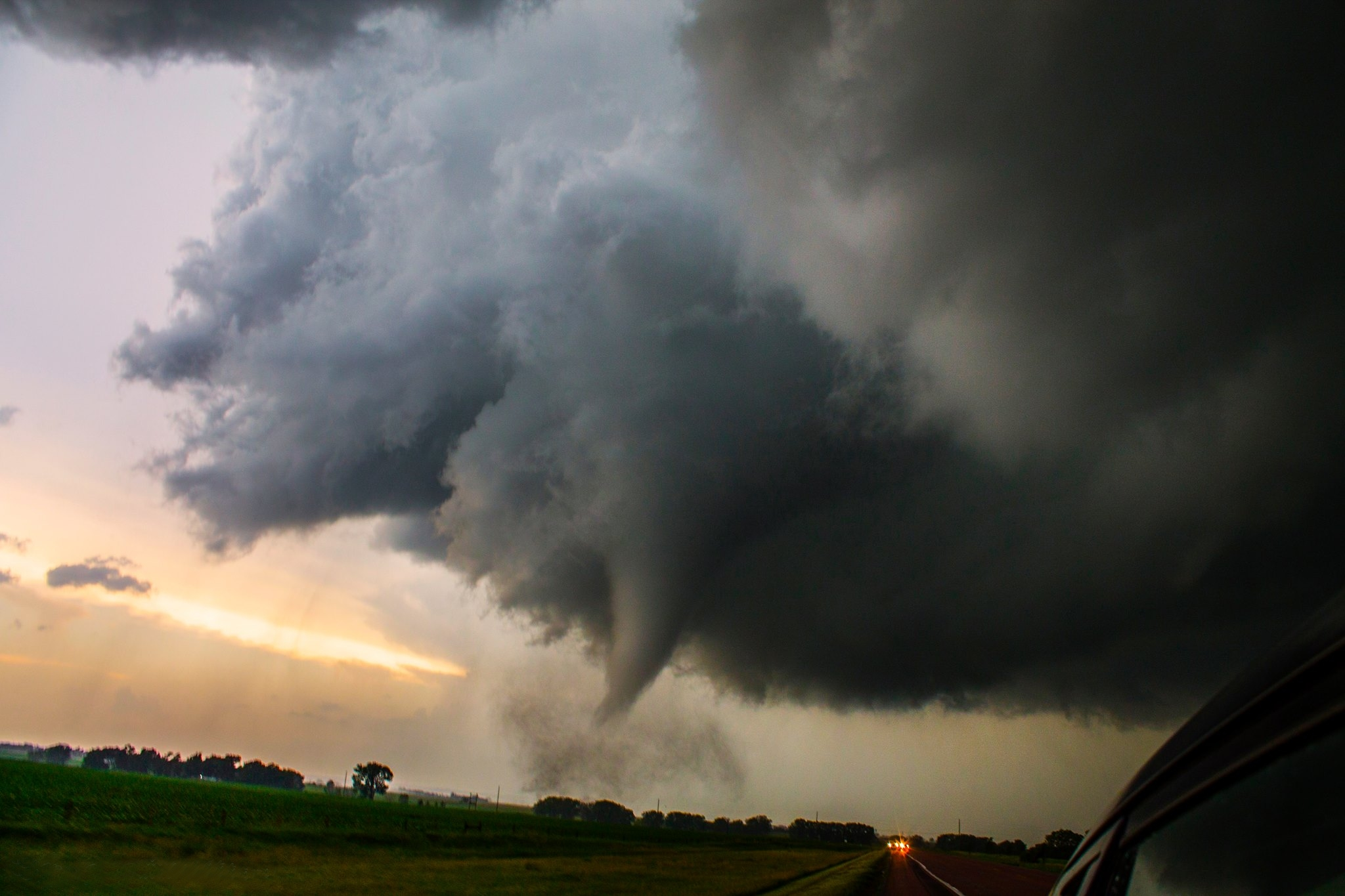
A developing EF4 tornado near Lane, South Dakota on June 18.

Strong tornadoes continued touching down into the early morning of June 17, as an EF2 ripped roofs off of homes in residential areas of Madison, Wisconsin, while an EF3 tornado severely damaged a school and multiple homes in Verona, Wisconsin. Later that day, an EF3 tornado tossed several cars, obliterated a mobile home, and swept away a one-room schoolhouse in a rural area near the Custer National Forest in Montana. A massive and slow-moving EF3 wedge tornado occurred near Coleridge, Nebraska as well, scouring farm fields, and destroying a few farmsteads and a dehydration plant. In Canada, an EF2 caused significant damage to homes in Angus, Ontario as well. On June 18, additional intense tornadoes occurred across parts of South Dakota, EF4 tornado that swept away a farmhouse and debarked trees as it passed near Alpena. A high-end EF2 also hit the town of Wessington Springs, resulting in major damage. Two fatalities occurred as a result of this outbreak, which produced 76 tornadoes.

=== June 30–July 1 (United States) ===
EFU	EF0	EF1	EF2	EF3	EF4	EF5
0	6	37	1	0	0	0

Early in the afternoon of June 30, a complex of thunderstorms developed over Iowa and evolved into a derecho that swept east-northeast to Lake Michigan. Later that evening a second derecho developed over eastern and central Iowa and moved eastward, moving through Indiana and into western Ohio in the early morning of July 1. These two events produced straight-line wind damage and multiple tornadoes from Iowa to portions of Michigan and Ohio. Most of the tornadoes were rated EF1, however, one tornado was determined to have caused low-end EF2 damage to a home in Traer, Iowa.

== July ==
=== July 8 (United States) ===
EFU	EF0	EF1	EF2	EF3	EF4	EF5
0	2	10	2	0	0	0

On July 8, a slight risk for severe weather was issued by the Storm Prediction Center as a cold front progressed through the region. Later that day, a line of storms began progressing across New York state. By 5:00 p.m. EDT, rotation began to emerge, and tornadoes became possible throughout the state, with a tornado warning being issued for Onondaga County. The storm hit Syracuse just after 6:00 p.m. EDT, as a macroburst with 85 mph (137 km/h) winds. A severe thunderstorm warning was issued for Smithfield in neighboring Madison County; however, an EF2 tornado began at 7:02 p.m. EDT, lasting three minutes on the ground, less than the required time for a rotational scan. This contributed to the lack of a tornado warning for Smithfield. The tornado that struck Smithfield traveled 1,000 feet (300 m) down a hill at approximately 50 miles per hour (80 km/h), making it more difficult to see. It had an entire path length of 2.5 miles (4.0 km).

The tornado, as it killed four people, officially became the second deadliest in New York history, behind an F1 tornado that killed nine people in East Coldenham on November 16, 1989. However, the status of the 1989 event as a tornado is disputed, with tornado experts Thomas P. Grazulis and Ted Fujita concluding that the event was a downburst. Damage was relatively light in comparison, for such a death toll at only $600,000, due to the short time on the ground. One house was thrown hundreds of feet into another house. In addition, over 40,000 people in the region lost power. The tornado either heavily damaged or destroyed approximately ten homes and downed numerous trees. Then-governor Andrew Cuomo said that "it looks like a literally a bomb went off in a house” and that the loss of life, especially of a four-month old baby, was unrepairable.

The Smithfield tornado was part of a small outbreak consisting of 14 tornadoes and causing $1.67 million in damage. Another EF2 tornado touched down in New Albany, Pennsylvania. The system also spawned three EF1 tornadoes in Ohio, two EF1 tornadoes in West Virginia, two other EF1 tornadoes and an EF0 tornado in Pennsylvania, and three other EF1 tornadoes and another EF0 tornado in New York. In spite of these other tornadoes, no one else was injured by the outbreak. In Maryland, the same storm system caused 42,000 people to lose power, and at a church, it killed one child and injured eight more in a damaging wind event. The entire storm system caused $350 million in economic losses, according to Aon.

=== July 15 (Australia) ===
Two people were killed when a tornado struck the western suburbs of Perth, Western Australia. The men, who suffered from pre-existing medical conditions, were killed in the suburb of Beaconsfield when the storm cut power to homes, and subsequently their electronic medical equipment. The tornado was confirmed by the Bureau of Meteorology.

=== July 26 (Mongolia) ===
A violent F4 stovepipe tornado moved through sparsely populated areas near Khashaat, Mongolia and impacted several farms, completely leveling or sweeping away a few homes and killing livestock. Vehicles were thrown and mangled beyond recognition, and significant damage to vegetation also occurred. One person was killed and several were injured.

=== July 27–28 (United States) ===
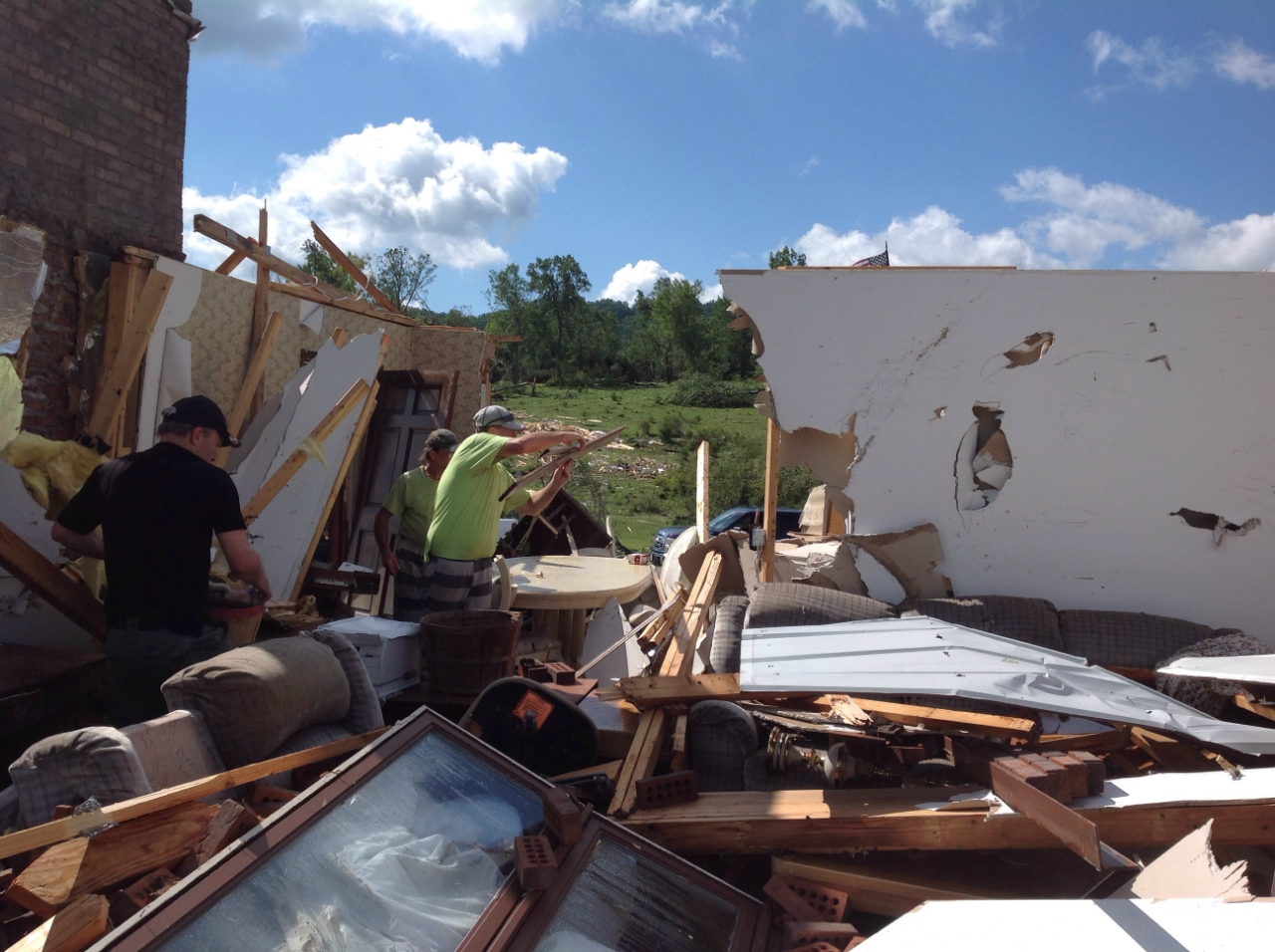
EF3 damage to a house in Speedwell, Tennessee.

EFU	EF0	EF1	EF2	EF3	EF4	EF5
0	5	6	1	1	0	0

A moderate severe weather outbreak occurred across the Eastern United States from July 27 to July 28. On the 27th, the weather system produced a low-end EF3 tornado that struck the small community of Speedwell, Tennessee, where several homes were destroyed and numerous trees were downed. This tornado was unusual due to the fact that most strong tornadoes that occur in July are confined to the northernmost states. A few other weak tornadoes were confirmed in other areas that day as well. The system produced one additional tornado on the 28th, a damaging EF2 that ripped through the Boston suburb of Revere, Massachusetts, severely damaging numerous homes and businesses in town and causing major tree damage in the area. That tornado caused $4 million in damage and was the first tornado ever in Suffolk County, Massachusetts.

== August ==
=== August 15 (Philippines) ===
An EF2 Stovepipe tornado struck Macabebe, Pampanga at around 18:00 PhST where it left a total of 100 people homeless and several people injured. It destroyed 19 houses with some completely flattened or had its roofs ripped away.

=== August 29–30 (Europe) ===
FU	F0	F1	F2	F3	F4	F5
0	2	1	0	1	0	0

Two tornadoes were confirmed in western Russia on the evening of August 29, including a large F3 tornado that struck the small village of Kariyevo in the Russian Republic of Bashkortostan. Numerous homes and farm structures were heavily damaged or destroyed, vehicles were flipped and tossed, and trees were snapped throughout the town. Two people were killed and at least 50 others were injured. The tornado was caught on video from multiple angles by several vehicle dashcams in Kariyevo. A brief F0 also touched down near Velikiy Novgorod, causing no damage. In Estonia, another weak F0 tornado occurred near Äksi, also causing no damage. On August 30, an F1 tornado occurred in Germany, causing minor damage in the Butjadingen Peninsula community of Eckwarderhörne.

== September ==
=== September 20–24 (Brazil) ===
FU	F0	F1	F2	F3	F4	F5
0	2	1	0	0	0	0

Three tornadoes touched down in Brazil between September 20 and 24. A tornado capsized a boat in the Paraguay River near the city of Porto Murtinho, in the state of Mato Grosso do Sul; 14 people died. An F0 tornado was recorded by a journalist in a rural area near Pedro Osório and Capão do Leão, in Rio Grande do Sul. There was no damage. Also, a tornadic waterspout was confirmed in Cidreira, in the same state.

== October ==
=== October 13–15 (United States) ===
EFU	EF0	EF1	EF2	EF3	EF4	EF5
0	22	22	3	0	0	0

A moderate severe weather outbreak occurred across the South, including 47 tornadoes. Most of these tornadoes were weak, though an EF2 tornado struck near the small community of Ashdown, Arkansas, tossing vehicles, injuring several people, and killing one when a mobile home was completely destroyed. Another EF2 tornado caused considerable damage in West Monroe, Louisiana. Game 3 of the 2014 American League Championship Series was postponed due to the severe weather in Kansas City, Missouri.

== November ==
=== November 16–17 (United States) ===
EFU	EF0	EF1	EF2	EF3	EF4	EF5
0	4	8	1	0	0	0

A small severe weather outbreak took place across the Deep South during the overnight and morning, mainly across the Florida Panhandle and Southwest Georgia. An EF2 tornado tore through Blountstown, Florida, damaging a correctional institute as well as flipping vehicles and damaging buildings around the area. This tornado tracked 22 miles through Calhoun and Gadsden counties in Florida, making it the longest track of a tornado in the area since the EF4 tornado that hit Enterprise, AL on March 1, 2007. The system also caused numerous tornado warnings to be issued across Southwest Georgia and Southeast Alabama, although there were no tornadoes in those areas. Other weak tornadoes hit Grand Ridge, Florida, and Laird, Florida that morning. Damaging winds would also cause damage across Jacksonville, Florida, and adjacent areas of Northern and Central Florida that afternoon.

=== November 23 (United States) ===
EFU	EF0	EF1	EF2	EF3	EF4	EF5
0	3	6	1	0	0	0

A moderate severe weather outbreak took place across the Deep South, particularly across portions of Alabama and Georgia. An EF0 tornado tore through Forkland in Greene County, Alabama, snapping and uprooting trees along its path. A long track tornado family began in Barbour County, Alabama, eventually producing tornadoes along Stewart, Chattahoochee, Talbot, Upson, Lamar, Butts, and Newton counties in Georgia. Hundreds of trees near Lakepoint Resort State Park were snapped. 6 tornadoes were produced by this supercell, with its strongest member being rated an EF2 with winds of 130 mph. Other tornadoes impacted Juliette, Georgia (EF1), Klondike (EF1), and Lumpkin, Georgia (EF1). The storm system also caused major power outages across Western Georgia and Eastern Alabama.

== December ==
=== December 12–15 (United States) ===
EFU	EF0	EF1	EF2	EF3	EF4	EF5
0	6	0	0	0	0	0

On December 12, 2014, a small EF0 tornado hit South Los Angeles, the first one to strike in the city in a decade, during a powerful storm complex. It damaged at least five homes, and cut the power to over 1,000 homes. After the winter storm moved inland, the system spawned five more EF0 tornadoes across the states of Oklahoma, Kansas, and Mississippi, from December 14-15.

=== December 23–24 (United States) ===
EFU	EF0	EF1	EF2	EF3	EF4	EF5
0	5	2	2	1	0	0

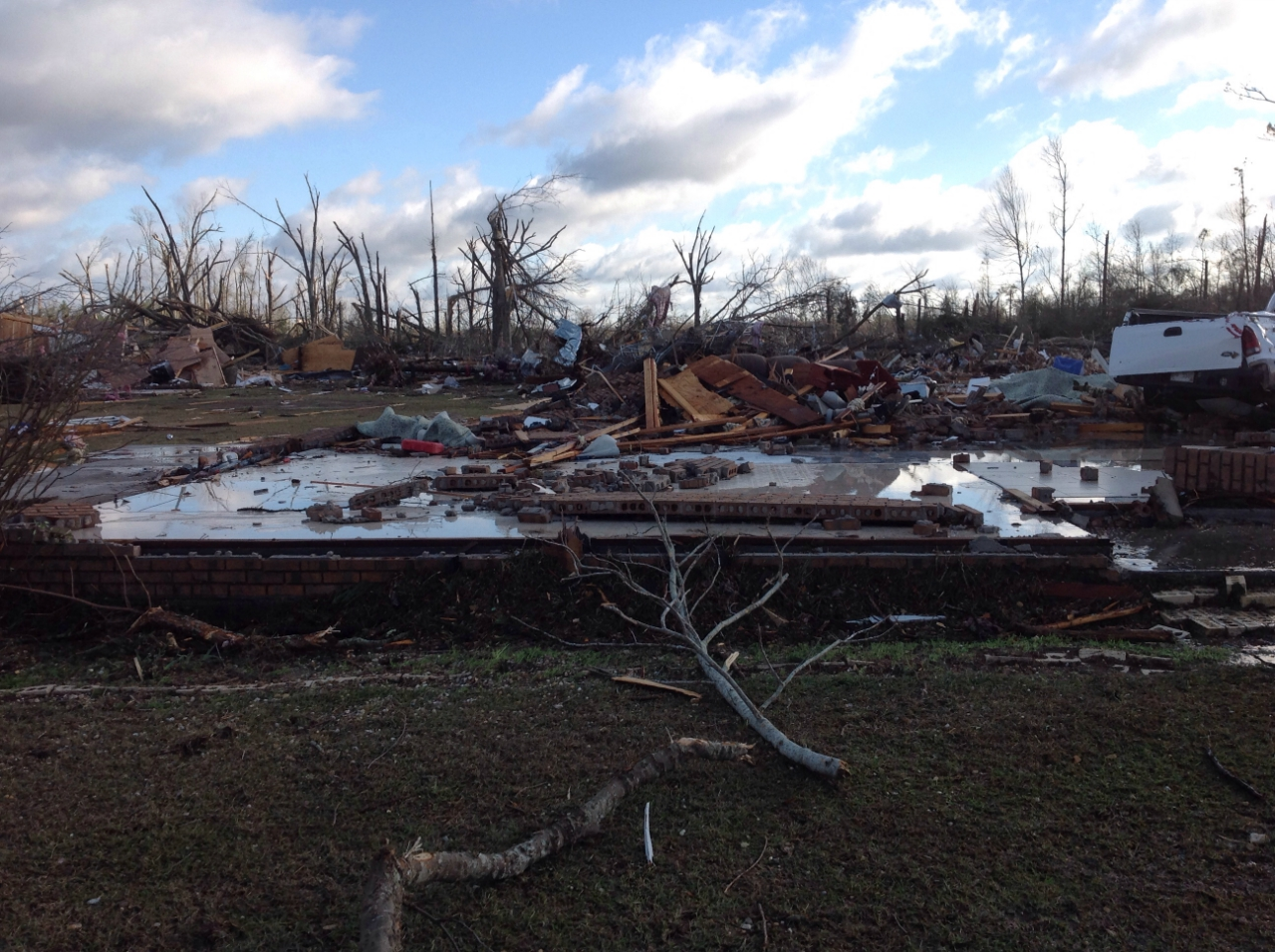
One of the small brick homes mostly swept away at high-end EF3 intensity.

A small but damaging outbreak of tornadoes occurred mainly across the Deep South on December 23 and 24, producing 10 tornadoes, killing five people, and leaving at least fifty others injured. It was the deadliest US tornado outbreak in the month of December since 2010. On the 23rd, an EF2 tornado touched down to the east of Amite, Louisiana, damaging multiple homes, destroying two outbuildings and two travel trailers, and downing numerous trees. A large, rain-wrapped, EF3 wedge tornado struck Columbia, Mississippi, at around 2:30pm later that day. The tornado began to the southwest of Columbia, moving northeast and snapping numerous trees. As the tornado entered town and crossed Marion School Rd, two well-built but small brick homes were destroyed, one of which was almost entirely reduced to its concrete foundation slab, though a sofa and a pickup truck parked at the residence remained on the foundation. Damage in this area was rated very high-end EF3, with winds up to 165 mph. The tornado maintained its strength as it crossed Mississippi Highway 13, heavily damaging several businesses and destroying homes. A brick house was reduced to a pile of rubble and a small wood-frame home was swept away nearby. Numerous trees were snapped and sheared off in this area as well. Further to the northeast, numerous metal-frame warehouse structures and storage units were destroyed as the tornado paralleled and eventually crossed Highway 98 in southern Columbia. Continuing into the east side of town, a National Guard armory sustained low-end EF3 damage. Numerous trees and were blown over onto homes in residential areas, a few of which sustained EF2 damage. Several power poles were snapped, and a strip mall, home health center, and a large industrial building were heavily damaged at EF2 intensity as well in this area. Several mobile homes were destroyed at a mobile home park before the tornado continued through rural areas northeast of town, snapping numerous trees and destroying an outbuilding at EF1 strength before dissipating. Three people were killed in Columbia and 20 others were injured. Another tornado passed to the northwest of Laurel, Mississippi, causing mainly minor tree and roof damage, though a small area of EF2 damage was noted as a small, unanchored wood-frame home was swept away and a nearby mobile home was completely destroyed, killing the two occupants. A few other weak tornadoes occurred across the Deep South that afternoon and evening. Three other weak tornadoes occurred the following day before the outbreak came to an end, including an EF1 that damaged 7 homes near Bristol, Georgia. Total estimated economic loss was at least $100 million, according to Aon Benfield.

== See also ==
- Weather of 2014
- Tornado
  - Tornadoes by year
  - Tornado records
  - Tornado climatology
  - Tornado myths
- List of tornado outbreaks
  - List of F5 and EF5 tornadoes
  - List of F4 and EF4 tornadoes
  - List of North American tornadoes and tornado outbreaks
  - List of 21st-century Canadian tornadoes and tornado outbreaks
  - List of European tornadoes and tornado outbreaks
  - List of tornadoes and tornado outbreaks in Asia
  - List of Southern Hemisphere tornadoes and tornado outbreaks
  - List of tornadoes striking downtown areas
  - List of tornadoes with confirmed satellite tornadoes
- Tornado intensity
  - Fujita scale
  - Enhanced Fujita scale
  - International Fujita scale
  - TORRO scale
