= Bud Tinning =

American baseball player (1906–1961)

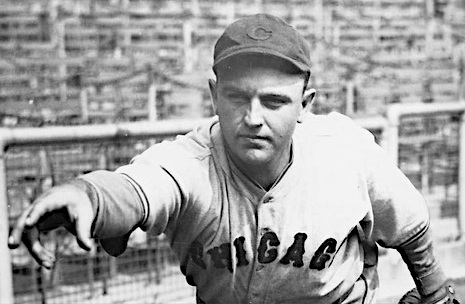
- Tinning, circa 1932
- Pitcher
- Born: March 12, 1906; Pilger, Nebraska, U.S.
- Died: January 17, 1961 (aged 54); Evansville, Indiana, U.S.
- Batted: Switch Threw: Right

MLB debut
- April 20, 1932, for the Chicago Cubs

Last MLB appearance
- April 27, 1935, for the St. Louis Cardinals

MLB statistics
- Win–loss record: 22–15
- Earned run average: 3.19
- Strikeouts: 135

Teams
- Chicago Cubs (1932–1934); St. Louis Cardinals (1935)

Lyle Forrest "Bud" Tinning (March 12, 1906 – January 17, 1961) was a major league pitcher for the Chicago Cubs and the St. Louis Cardinals in the 1930s.

== Early minor league career ==
Tinning was born and raised in Pilger, Nebraska, where he was a sports star for the high school and local sandlot baseball teams. He was born into the Arthur Tinning family. His father was a farmer by trade and the family lived northwest of Pilger on their farm. Bud’s mother was from the pioneering Allison family of Stanton, Nebraska. His siblings included two sisters Mabel and Marie, and two brothers, Oger and Dewey. Bud's mother died in childbirth when Bud was only two years old. As a youngster, he attended Pilger High School for two years, however he quit school to help his father on the farm.

In the summer, Tinning played baseball with country teams on local sandlots such as hayfields or in pastures. Marty Willers was a catcher for Bud during that time and said that Bud was known as the hardest thrower around with an excellent fast ball. He was first noticed by professional baseball scouts while pitching for the Genoa, Nebraska town team, and began his professional career with the Omaha Packers, a franchise in the Western League.

Early in Tinning's professional career, he had issues with his weight and conditioning, and his performance with the Packers suffered until he got himself in proper playing condition. Once he achieved this, he finally developed into a major league prospect.

Tinning's minor league career was highlighted by earning all-star status in the Western League for Des Moines in 1930, as well as for his 1931 season with the Minneapolis Millers, where he was noticed by the Cubs and was signed for the 1932 season at the age of twenty-six. Lou Gehrig wrote: "Lyle hung up one of the most sensational minor league records ever established in 1931 while pitching for Des Moines in the Western League when he won 24 games and was beaten only twice".

== Chicago Cubs ==
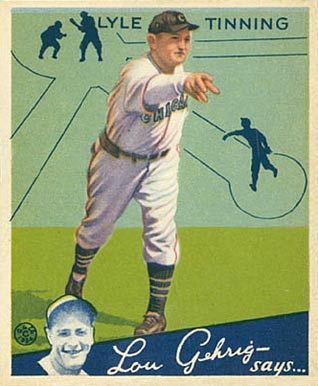
1934 Goudey trading card of Tinning

While a starter in the minors, Tinning soon proved to be a success as a long relief pitcher, who could be counted on for occasional starts.

Bud was 10 years younger than the manager for the first part of the 1932 season, Rogers Hornsby. In the 1932 World Series, Tinning pitched three shutout innings against the New York Yankees in two relief appearances, and struck out Babe Ruth. The Baseball Almanac described Bud as "a crafty pitcher who started about one third of his games".

Tinning's best year in the majors was in 1933, as he went 13–6 with a 3.18 ERA, and led the National League in winning percentage and was ninth in total shutouts, with three. Tinning wore jersey #21 in 1932, then wore #22 for the 1933–34 seasons.

== Injury and career's end ==
In November 1934, Tinning and Dick Ward were traded to the St. Louis Cardinals for Tex Carleton. This should have been a benefit for Tinning, as the Cardinals were hitting their peak as their "Gashouse Gang" era was dominating baseball. However, Tinning injured his arm in 1935 and pitched in only four games, effectively ending his career. After a brief comeback attempt in the minor leagues, he served as a minor league manager for several years.

During his baseball years, Tinning regularly returned to his hometown of Pilger to visit. He and Inez would stay with Bud's brother, Dewey and his wife and their two daughters. The brothers often hunted pheasants during these visits and Bud packed cleaned birds in dry ice to take back so he and his friends in Chicago could feast! On occasional summer visits to Pilger as a pitcher, Bud would throw on the Pilger diamond and his nieces, Mary and Betty would watch the game and tell everyone, "That's our uncle!"

In 99 games over four seasons (1932–35), Tinning posted a 22–15 won–loss record with a 3.19 earned run average in 405 2/3 innings pitched and recording 135 strikeouts.

After leaving baseball, Tinning worked for Mace Service in Terre Haute, Indiana, and then owned and managed a motel in Evansville, Indiana, with his wife, Inez Barnett of Terre Haute, whom he married in 1932. Inez died in 1943.

Tinning died of a heart attack on January 17, 1961, and he was buried with his family in the Pilger village cemetery after a funeral at the Pilger Methodist Church. Bud and Inez had no children.

In his book Nebraska High School Sports, Nebraska sports historian Jerry Mathers recognized Tinning as Pilger's all-time greatest athlete.
