= 2014 Mayflower–Vilonia tornado =

2014 EF4 tornado in central Arkansas, U.S.

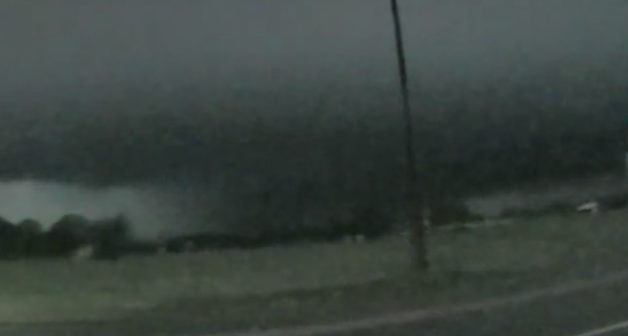
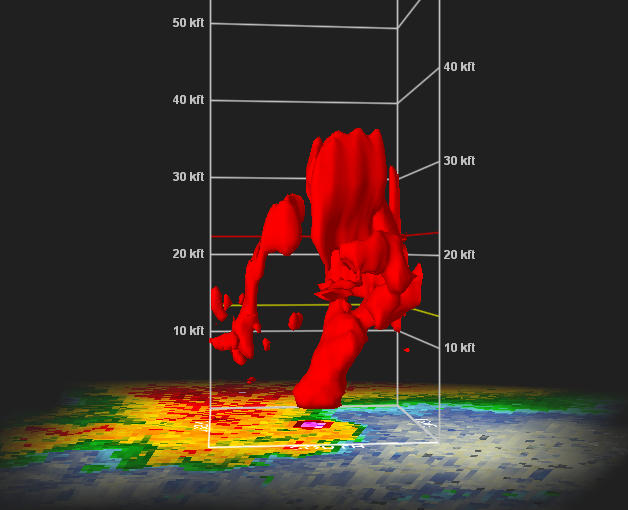
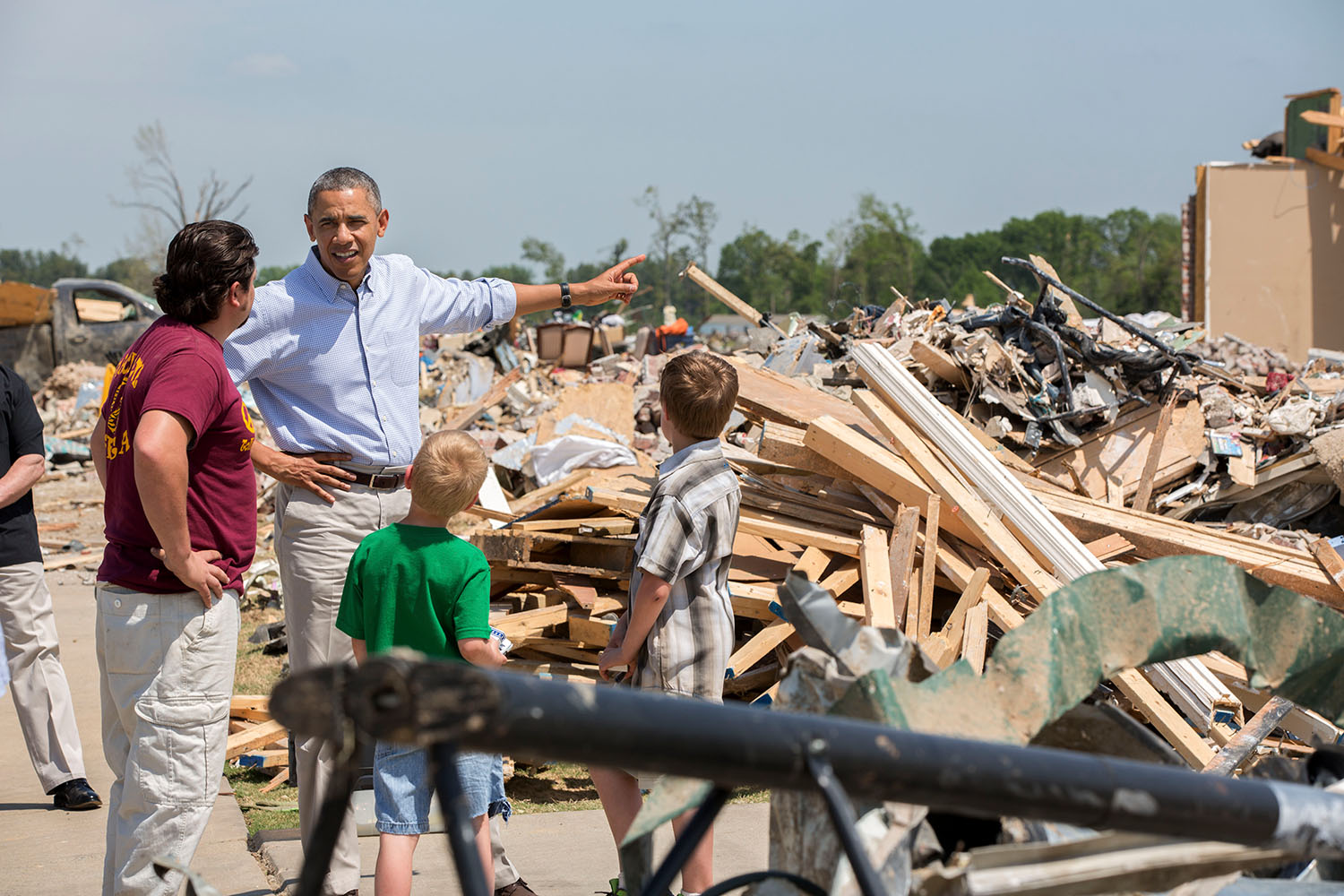
- Clockwise from top: The tornado seen approaching Vilonia, where nine were killed; then-President Barack Obama surveying tornado damage in Vilonia following the tornado; weather radar reflectivity data in 3D of the supercell that produced the Vilonia tornado

Meteorological history
- Formed: April 27, 2014, 7:06 p.m. CDT (UTC−05:00)
- Dissipated: April 27, 2014, 8:02 p.m. CDT (UTC−05:00)
- Duration: 56 minutes

EF4 tornado
- on the Enhanced Fujita scale
- Max width: 1,320 yards (0.75 mi; 1.21 km)
- Path length: 41.10 miles (66.14 km)
- Highest winds: 190 mph (310 km/h)

Overall effects
- Fatalities: 16
- Injuries: 193
- Damage: $223.45 million (2014 USD)
- Areas affected: Paron, Mayflower, Lake Conway, Vilonia, and El Paso, Arkansas
- Part of the tornado outbreak and floods of April 27–30, 2014 and tornadoes of 2014

In the evening of April 27, 2014, a large and destructive high-end EF4 tornado moved through several communities northwest of Little Rock, Arkansas. The event, mononymously known as the Mayflower–Vilonia tornado, was part of a larger outbreak of severe weather across the central and southern United States. It devastated the towns of Paron, Mayflower, Lake Conway, Vilonia, and El Paso. In less than an hour, the tornado injured over one hundred people and killed sixteen. The tornado's destructive path was 41.10 miles (66.14 km), with a peak width of 1,320 yards (1.21 km).

The tornado touched down near the western edge of Pulaski County, moving to the northwest before impacting Paron at EF3 intensity, killing three people and damaging several residential buildings as it moved by. The tornado continued to move to the northwest as it left the community in ruins, reaching EF4 intensity for the first time as it entered the city limits of Mayflower. The tornado produced heavy structural damage as it tore through the southern edge of the town, killing three people. The tornado later hit Vilonia, where it produced high-end EF4 damage. The tornado dissipated a short time later.

On April 29, Faulkner County was declared a federal disaster area by President Barack Obama, who was visiting the town of Vilonia to survey the damage and speak with families of the victims. The declaration allowed residents to receive federal aid and low-cost loans to cover uninsured losses. The final rating of the tornado was a source of controversy, with some damage analysts concluding that EF5 damage was plausible.

== Meteorological synopsis ==
=== Setup ===
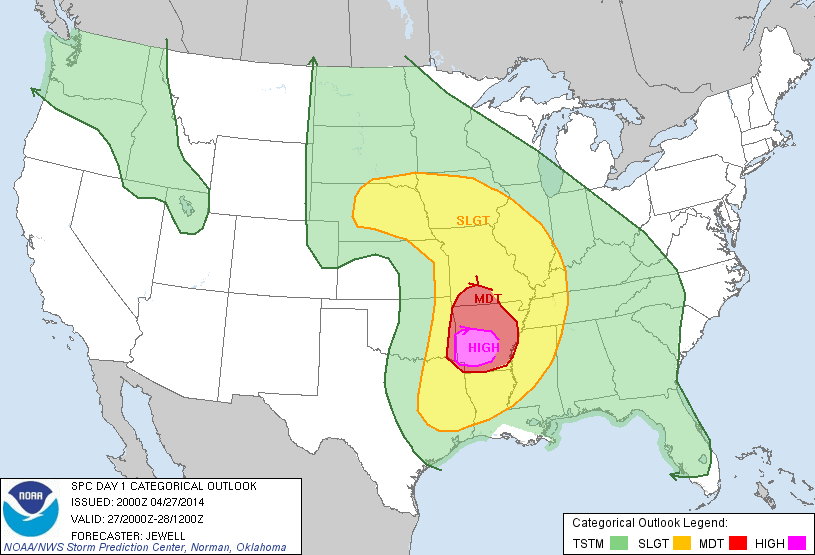
The National Weather Service Storm Prediction Center's Day 1 Convective Outlook for April 27, showing the Categorical Graphic

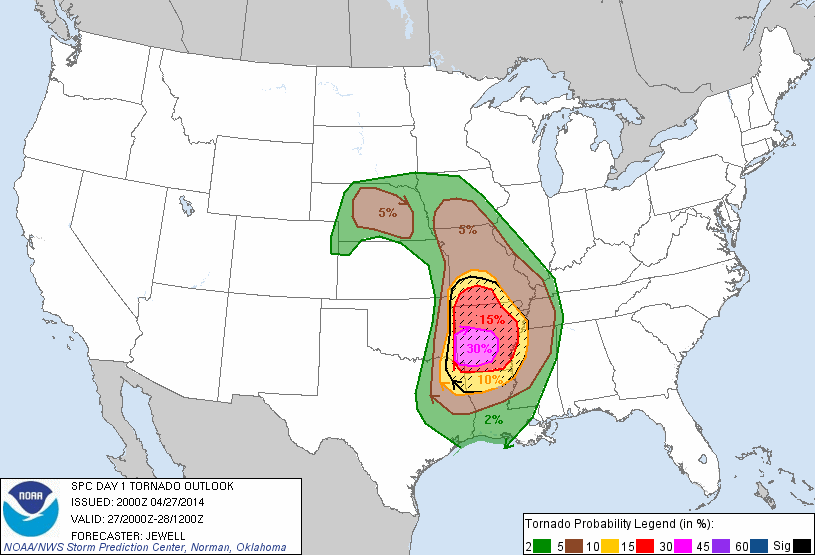
The probability of a tornado within 25 miles of a point (cross-hatched area: 10% or greater probability of EF2+ tornadoes)

The Storm Prediction Center (SPC) indicated the potential for a large-scale tornado outbreak for six days in advance on its 4–8 day outlook, beginning early on April 19 valid at day 5. While models diverged on the exact nature and intensity of the expected mid-level shortwave trough, there was broad support for a dry line to develop in central Oklahoma. By April 22, the SPC expanded the threat zone for day 6 for the remainder of Oklahoma and central High Plains region, with strong upper-level winds to spread over the central High Plains. Three days later, a Day 3 moderate risk was issued early on April 25 for the Ark-La-Tex region, citing the increased risk for a severe weather outbreak, with the risk of trailing supercells.

=== Forecast ===
The strong mid-level shortwave trough developed into a closed low-pressure area as the system occluded over the central High Plains on April 27, 2014. An associated surface cyclone reached peak intensity while a trailing cold front moved eastward across eastern Kansas, eastern Oklahoma and northern Texas. There were two areas where severe weather was expected: morning prefrontal convection from Kansas and Oklahoma into Missouri and Iowa and warm sector supercell development across southeast Oklahoma and northeast Texas into Arkansas. By 20:00 UTC on April 27, the SPC issued a rare high risk for much of central Arkansas and a 30% hatched risk for tornadoes across the same corridor, citing the anticipation of numerous supercells capable of producing intense tornadoes. Expected thermodynamic conditions of storm-relative helicity values in of 300–400 m^{2}s^{−2}, convective available potential energy (CAPE) values of 2,500–3,000 J/kg^{−1}, a 40–50 kn low level jet and boundary-layer dewpoints of 57 to 61 °F (14 to 16 °C) were expected to foster supercell development and strong to intense tornadoes across Arkansas, along with very large hail. A particularly dangerous situation (PDS) tornado watch was issued at that time for central Arkansas, where the Mayflower–Vilonia tornado would soon develop.

== Tornado summary ==
=== Formation ===
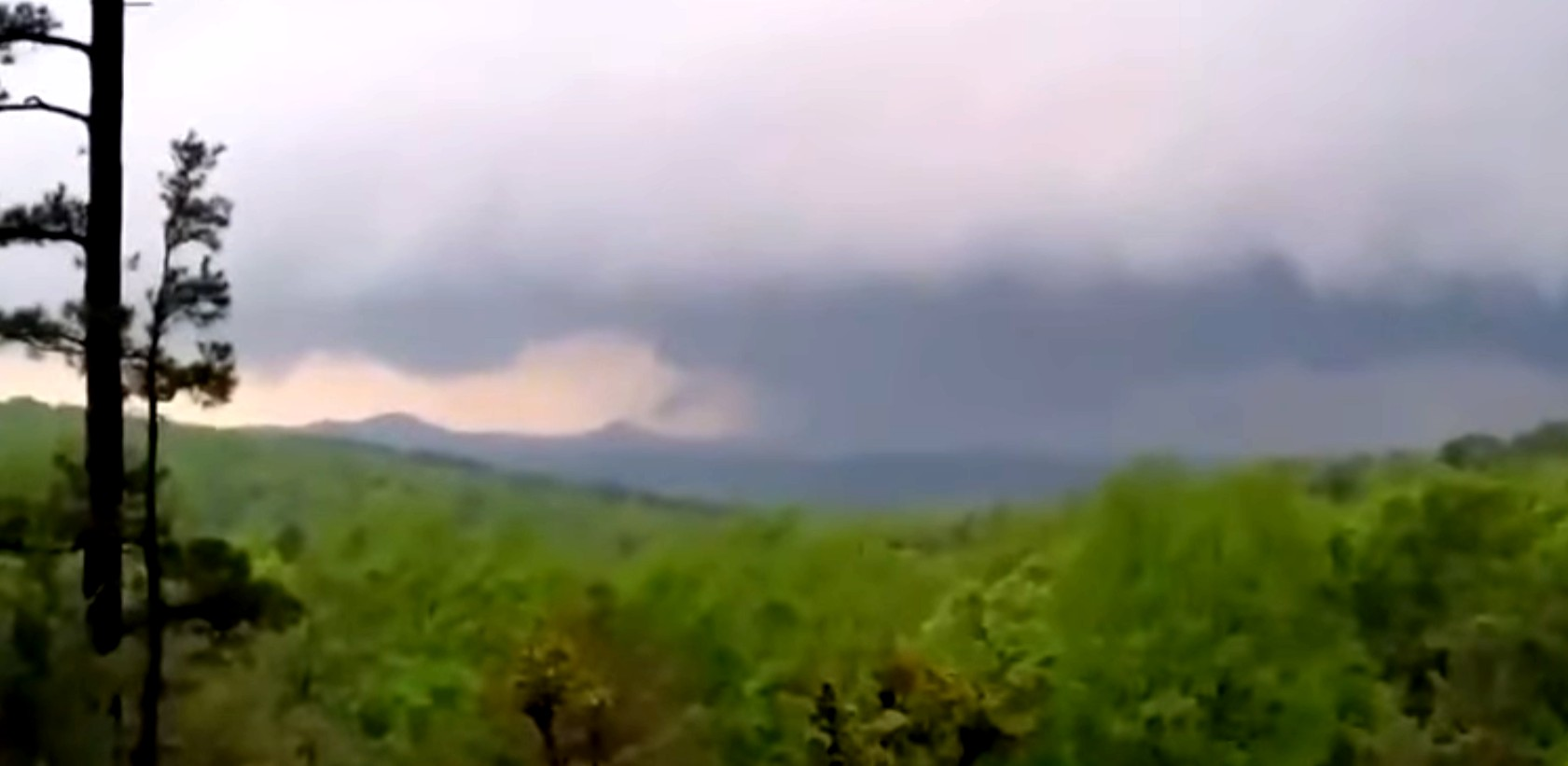
The tornado in rural Faulkner County, seen from the Maumelle area

At 7:06 p.m. CDT (0006 UTC), the tornado touched down on Heinze Cove in western Pulaski County, roughly 6 miles (9.7 km) east of Paron, and tracked north-northeast. After crossing the Turkey Trail and uprooting trees at EF1 strength, the tornado dramatically intensified and struck a small residential area at EF3 intensity. Two homes were destroyed and another was severely damaged in this area. One of the homes was built with bolts along the foundation perimeter and was reduced to a bare slab, (Note: "Slabs" refer to the cement or brick foundations that buildings rest on, a feature common in structures located in the United States.) normally indicative of EF5 strength; however, it was found that the anchor bolts were not secured with nuts and washers, and nearby vehicles were not moved, which indicated a lesser intensity. Three people were killed in that area. The storm weakened as it turned more northeasterly and moved through a forested area. Damage to trees and homes in this area was rated EF1. At 7:14 p.m. (0014 UTC), it struck Northpoint at EF2 intensity, causing severe damage to several homes. Roofs were removed entirely from homes, though the walls on these structures remained mostly intact. After briefly crossing Lake Maumelle, the tornado caused significant tree damage between Roland and Natural Steps with some trees being stripped of their foliage and debarked. Moving through an unpopulated area, the tornado intensified before crossing the Arkansas River and entering Faulkner County around 7:26 p.m. (0026 UTC).

=== Impact in Mayflower ===
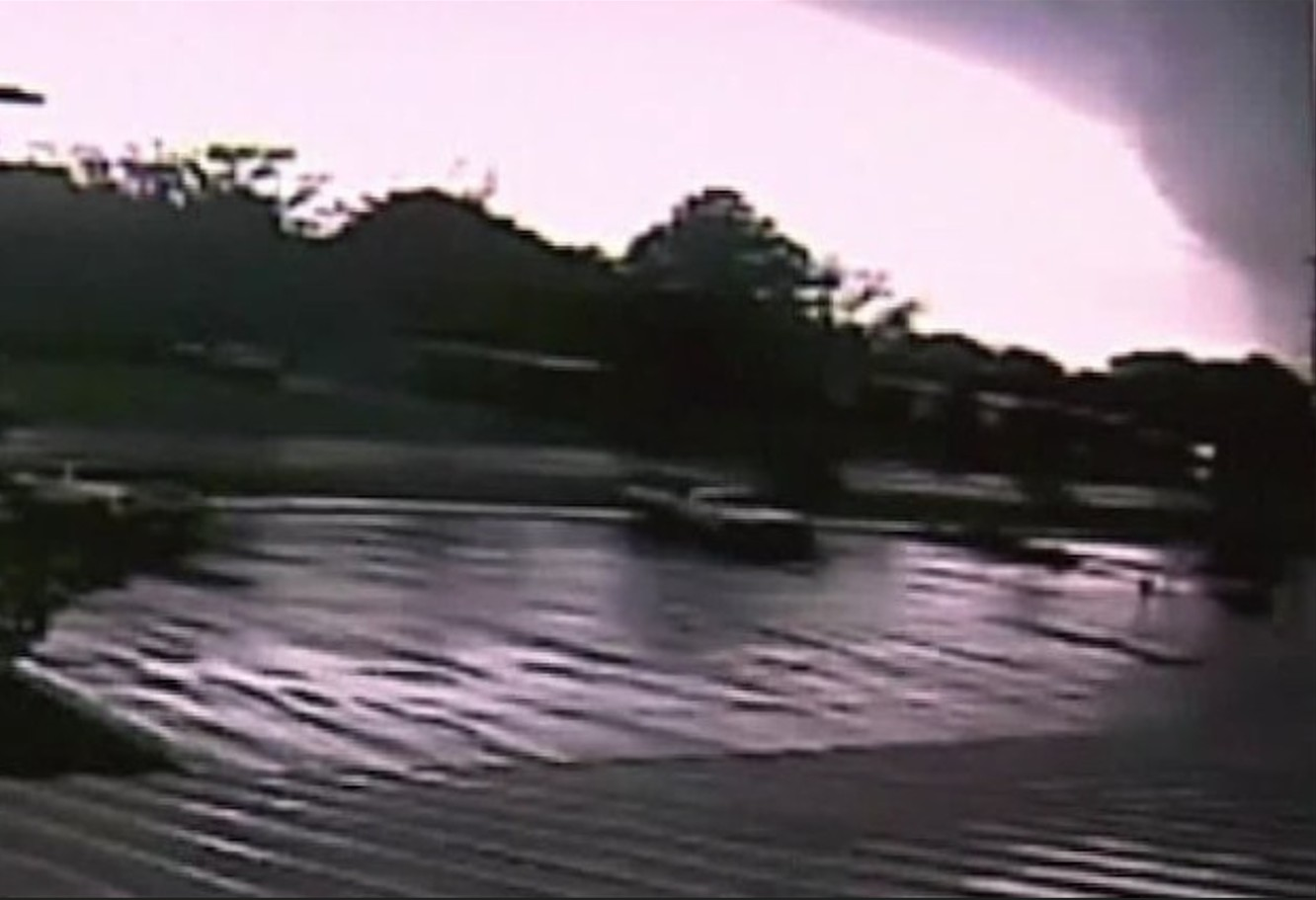
The tornado approaching Mayflower as seen from a security camera.

The tornado entered Faulkner County and struck the River Plantation subdivision at the southwest edge of Mayflower. Here, EF4 damage took place with large, two-story homes being leveled with only piles of debris left on their foundations. On the northeast side of the subdivision, one person was killed after debris struck the door of her storm shelter and opened it, exposing her to the tornado. The storm shelter's door was found to have been of sub-standard construction. Near where this fatality took place, large concrete road barriers were blown over and moved, and calculations revealed that this was also likely indicative of EF4 intensity. Just outside the subdivision, a power substation sustained major damage. Continuing northeast, the storm tore across the south edge of Mayflower and crossed AR 365 and I-40, tossing semi-trucks, cars, and road equipment from the highway. I-40 was closed for a time after the storm.

Track map of the tornado through southern Mayflower. The color-coded triangles indicate the level of damage at a specific location, and the red line indicates the path of the tornado. Key EF0 65–85 mph EF1 86–110 mph EF2 111–135 mph EF3 136–165 mph EF4 166–200 mph

A business district in this area experienced mainly EF3 damage, with 18-wheelers tossed, industrial buildings damaged or destroyed, and some nearby homes heavily damaged. A recreational vehicle (RV) dealership on the other side of the highway was destroyed at EF4 intensity (though meteorologist/civil engineer Tim Marshall applied an EF3 rating at this location due to structural flaws), along with most of the RVs; three of which were found wrapped around a nearby billboard. A vehicle repair shop, millwork company, construction company, and church in southern Mayflower were also destroyed, and a home improvement store was badly damaged. In addition to the fatality in the storm shelter, two other people were killed in Mayflower.

The tornado then crossed Lake Conway, downing numerous trees and causing a mixture of EF2 and EF3 damage to homes along the lake shore. Some block-foundation frame homes along with multiple mobile homes were swept into the lake by the tornado. The Arkansas Game and Fish Commission lost a clubhouse, shop, horse barn, residence, metal carports, shower house, and several dog kennels in this area, and eventually removed 627 tons of tornado debris from the lake. The tornado then caused mainly EF2 damage as it struck areas in and around Saltillo. Numerous homes, mobile homes, sheds, barns, trees, and a church were damaged or destroyed in the Saltillo area. Two homes near Saltillo had only interior walls left standing, with the damage to those homes rated EF3.

=== Damage to Vilonia and later dissipation ===
Further northeast, the tornado began to re-intensify dramatically as it approached the Vilonia Bypass (US 64), reaching EF4 strength for a second time. Just southwest of the bypass, some poorly anchored homes were obliterated and swept from their foundations, and cars were tossed hundreds of yards away. Another frame home was left with only interior walls standing, and two mobile homes were obliterated with the frames thrown up to two streets away. Two children were killed in these homes. Shortly before 7:50 p.m. (0050 UTC), the tornado moved into the town of Vilonia at high-end EF4 strength, which had been struck by an EF2 tornado that killed four people on April 25, 2011, three years and two days prior. The EF4 tornado first struck the recently built Vilonia Middle School, destroying the top floor and causing most walls to collapse. With winds estimated as high as 190 mph (310 km/h) and the circulation spanning 3/4 mi (1.2 km), the tornado moved through the town center. Numerous homes and businesses were destroyed with only piles of debris or bare slabs left behind, and vehicles were thrown hundreds of yards and mangled beyond recognition, some of which were crushed into small balls or stripped down to their frames. Trees in town were completely debarked and denuded, low-lying shrubs were completely stripped and debarked, and extensive wind-rowing of debris occurred. An aerial flyover revealed an extensive swath of ground scouring through the town.

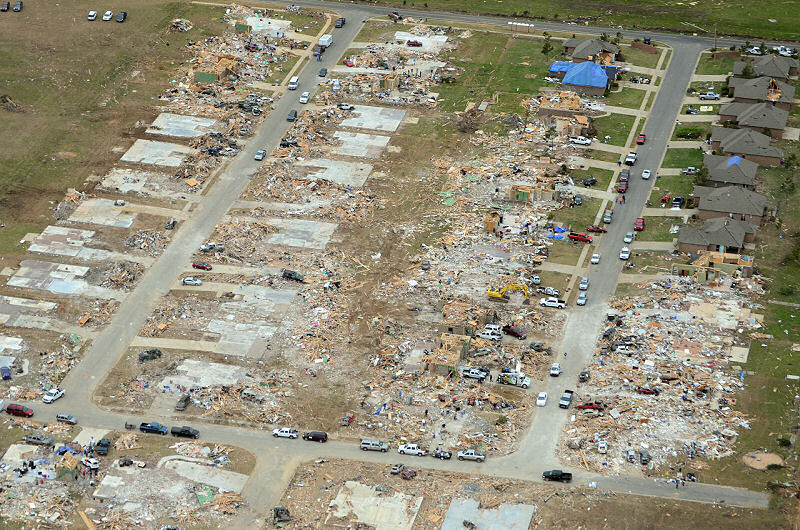
Aerial view of EF4 damage in Vilonia

A dollar store, a strip mall, two auto repair shops, the old city hall, a gas station, a church life center, a real estate office, an investment firm, an auto parts store, and a fried fish restaurant were all completely destroyed in downtown Vilonia. The crumpled remains of a 29,998-pound metal fertilizer tank were found behind the destroyed strip mall, nearly 3/4 mi (1.2 km) away from where it originated. Nine people were killed in the town. As it moved out of downtown Vilonia, it tore directly through the Parkwood Meadows subdivision on the northeast side of town. Entire rows of homes were reduced to bare slabs at this location, though it was revealed that the vast majority of the homes were nailed rather than bolted to their foundations, preventing an EF5 rating.

Continuing past Vilonia, the tornado weakened to EF3 strength as it passed just south of Williams Lake. A large metal arena building and a mobile home were destroyed in that area, with a few other structures sustaining EF1 damage nearby. Shortly after 8:00 p.m. (0100 UTC) the storm moved through densely forested areas and into White County, just west of El Paso. The tornado briefly regained EF2 status and destroyed two manufactured homes. One person was killed in one of the manufactured homes at this location. It soon dissipated at 8:02 p.m. (0106 UTC) roughly 1 mile (1.6 km) north-northeast of El Paso near a forested area. Overall, the tornado remained on the ground for 56 minutes, from 7:06 p.m. to 8:02 p.m. (0006 – 0102 UTC) and traveled along a 41.1 miles (66.1 km) path.

=== Later tornadoes ===
The same supercell that produced the Mayflower–Vilonia tornado later dropped four other tornadoes, all in the state of Arkansas. The strongest, rated EF2, injured one person near Center Hill.

EF#	Location	County	Start Coord.	Time (UTC)	Path length	Max width	Summary
EF2	SE of Joy to Center Hill to SSE of Mount Pisgah	White	35.2491°N 91.9215°W	0116–0125	7.32 mi (11.78 km)	880 yd (800 m)	Two manufactured homes, two barns, and a tractor shed were destroyed, a site-built home had its exterior walls collapsed, and a metal barn was leaned over. A site-built home and a few mobile homes sustained roof damage, and hundreds of trees were downed as well. One person was injured.
EF0	Steprock area	White	35.4236°N 91.674°W	0138–0140	1.64 mi (2.64 km)	250 yd (230 m)	A brief tornado downed numerous trees, resulting in damage five homes.
EF1	NNW of Bare Stone to N of Denmark	White, Jackson	35.4639°N 91.6414°W	0143–0149	5.28 mi (8.50 km)	100 yd (91 m)	A farm building was destroyed, a home was damaged, and several trees were downed.
EF1	WNW of Union Hill	Independence	35.5439°N 91.5524°W	0152–0153	0.84 mi (1.35 km)	50 yd (46 m)	A brief tornado downed trees and power lines.

== Aftermath ==
16 people were killed as a direct result of the tornado while 193 others were injured. The sixteen fatalities made the tornado the deadliest in Arkansas since an F4 tornado killed 35 on May 15, 1968. It was also the first EF4 tornado of 2014 in the United States, as well as the first EF4-rated tornado to impact Arkansas since May 24-25, 2011.

Confirmed fatalities from the Mayflower tornado
Name	Age	County	Community	Location of death
Paula Blakemore	55	White	El Paso	El Paso Road
Mark Bradley	51	Faulkner	Mayflower	Fortner Drive
Helen Greer	72	Faulkner	Mayflower	Plantation Drive
Robert Oliver	82	Faulkner	Mayflower	Dam Road
Unknown (Note: An injured woman gave birth to a child immediately following the tornado, which died shortly after being born. The death is counted as a direct result of the tornado.)	0	Faulkner	Mayflower	Ponderosa Drive
Jamye Collins	50	Faulkner	Vilonia	U.S. Route 64
Jeffrey Hunter	22	Faulkner	Vilonia	Clover Ridge Drive
Dennis Lavergne	52	Faulkner	Vilonia	Cemetery Road
Glenna Lavergne	53	Faulkner	Vilonia	Cemetery Road
David Mallory	58	Faulkner	Vilonia	North Street
Cameron Smith	9	Faulkner	Vilonia	Cody Lane
Tyler Smith	7	Faulkner	Vilonia	Cody Lane
Daniel Wassom	31	Faulkner	Vilonia	Aspen Creek Drive
Tori Tittle	20	Saline	Paron	Deer Drive
Rebekah Tittle	14	Saline	Paron	Deer Drive
Rob Tittle	48	Saline	Paron	Deer Drive

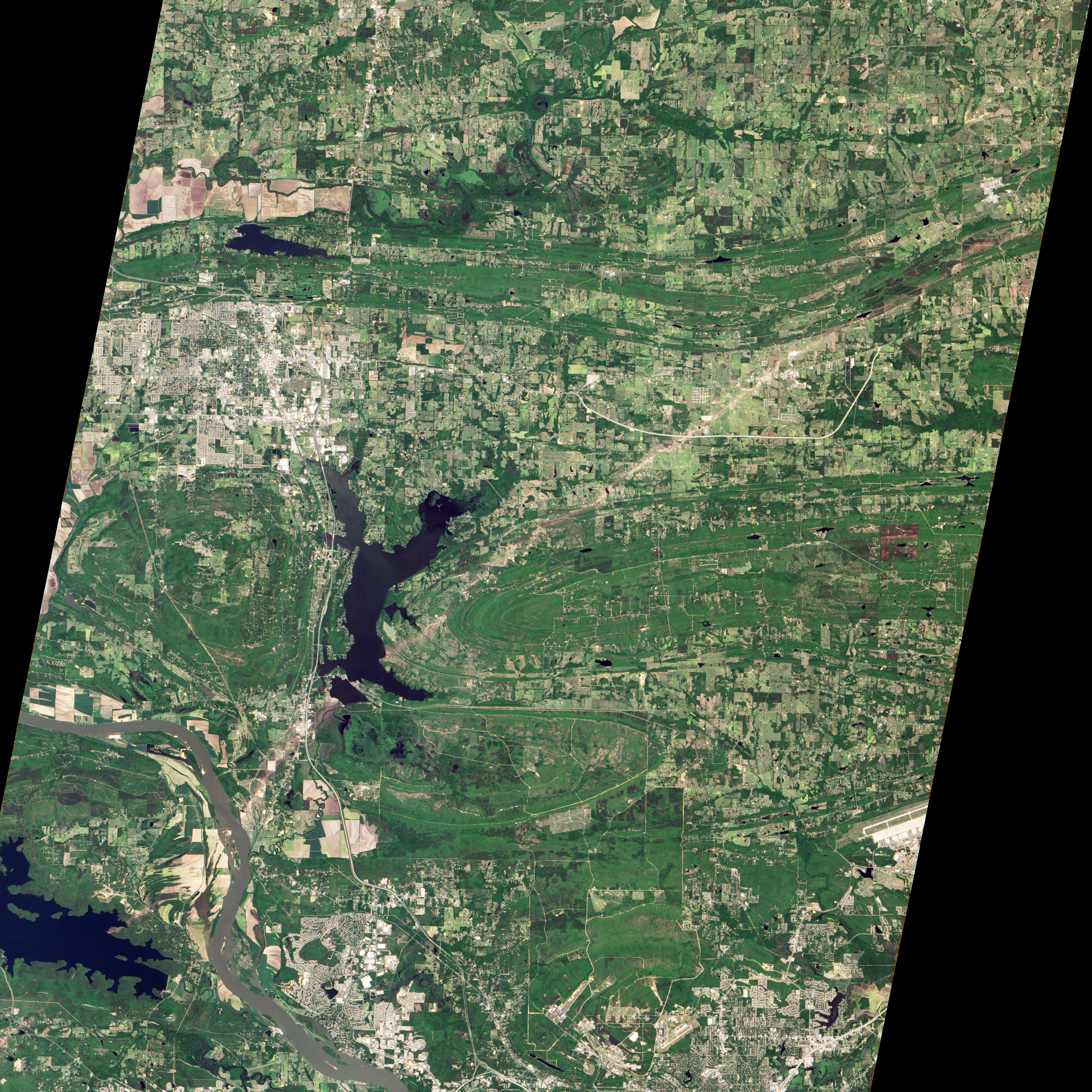
Ground scouring produced by the tornado (whitish line, bottom left to top right) seen on May 2. The scouring was so intense that it was visible on satellite imagery.

=== Damage ===
The tornado extensively damaged both Mayflower and Vilonia along a 41.1 mi (66.1 km) path. In Mayflower, the tornado inflicted EF3 and EF4-rated damage to numerous structures, including homes and a large metal building. The tornado also tossed cars and wrapped mobile homes around a billboard, indicative of high strength. Debris produced by the tornado in Mayflower was found in Lake Conway; 1,254,000 pounds (569,000 kg) of debris were fished out of the lake.

In the Vilonia area, the tornado crumbled the concrete walls of a strip mall and a large steel tank weighing approximately 29,998 pounds (13,607 kg) was lofted and tossed 3,911 feet (1,192 m) before being dropped next to the strip mall. Concrete parking stops, located in the parking lot of the Vilonia United Methodist Church were shifted laterally by the tornado; damage of this degree was also observed in the 2011 Joplin and 2011 El Reno–Piedmont EF5 tornadoes. The tornado produced ground scouring deep enough to be viewed on satellite imagery.

==== EF4 rating controversy ====
The National Weather Service office in Little Rock noted that if this tornado occurred prior to the change to the Enhanced Fujita Scale in 2007, the damage it caused "might [have been] justification for an F5 rating." However, it was revealed that almost every home in Vilonia lacked anchor bolts and were anchored with cut nails instead. The new scale accounts for homes that use cut nails instead of anchor bolts, which do not effectively provide resistance against violent tornadoes.

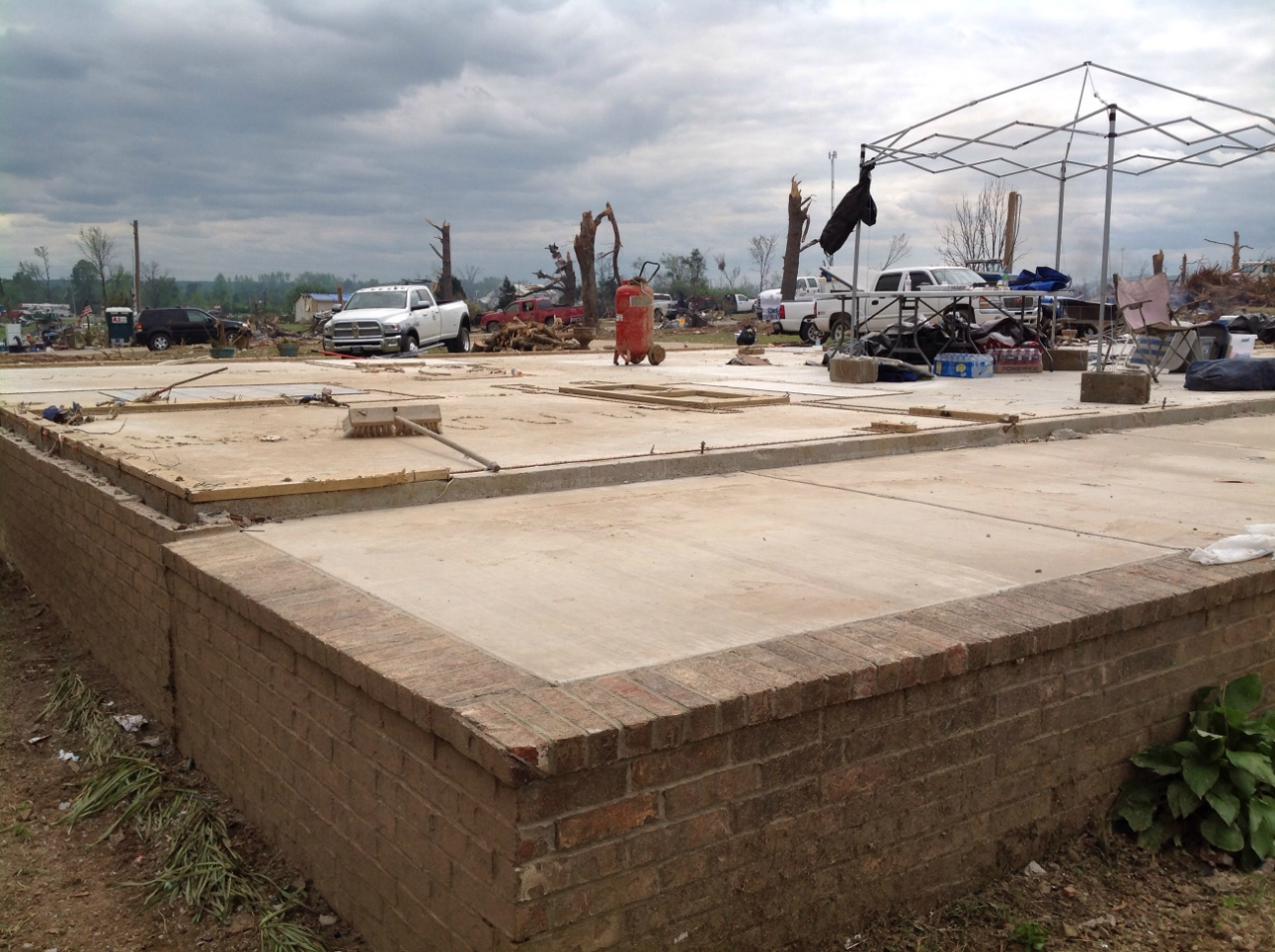
High-end EF4 damage to a home in Vilonia

The final decision on an EF4 rating was based on this as well. However, meteorologist/civil engineer Timothy P. Marshall noted in his survey of the damage that the rating assigned was "lower bound", and despite the presence of construction flaws, this doesn't rule out "the possibility that EF5 winds could have occurred." Further inspection from surveyors revealed that one home that was swept away along E Wicker St. was indeed properly bolted to its foundation. However, an inspection of the context surrounding the house revealed that small trees in a ditch near the home were still standing and that the residence had possibly been pummeled by heavy debris from downtown Vilonia, exacerbating the level of destruction.

On January 23, 2025, Anthony W. Lyza with the National Severe Storms Laboratory along with Harold E. Brooks and Makenzie J. Kroca with the University of Oklahoma's School of Meteorology published a paper to the American Meteorological Society, where they stated the tornado in Vilonia was an "EF5 candidate" and opined that the EF5 starting wind speed should be 190 mph (310 km/h) instead of 201 mph (323 km/h).

=== Recovery efforts ===
Members of the Arkansas National Guard were deployed to Vilonia to aid in recovery efforts.

Regarding recovery efforts, U.S. senator John Boozman noted that “I was able to get over here not too long after [the tornado] and survey the damage. The amount of work that’s been done, the way the local community have banded together with their citizens, is truly amazing".

== Case studies ==
=== Mayflower Door Analysis ===
Following the event, researchers from Texas Tech University conducted a study on an above-ground shelter where one death in Mayflower was recorded. The shelter remained intact, but the metal door of the shelter was bent and blown open by a large piece of debris. The study found that the door was not properly constructed and was not in compliance with Federal Emergency Management Agency standards. The study also recommended that all safe room doors should be tested to prevent in-shelter fatalities from occurring during tornadoes.

=== Damage survey of the Mayflower–Vilonia Arkansas tornado ===
An in-depth damage survey was conducted by four researchers, including engineer Timothy P. Marshall, in conjunction with the National Oceanic and Atmospheric Administration and National Weather Service, along the damage path produced by the tornado. The study found that two areas of damage produced by the tornado, both to retail buildings, may have received an EF5 rating if the structures were well-built.

== See also ==
- Tornado intensity
- EF5 drought
- List of F4, EF4, and IF4 tornadoes
  - List of F4 and EF4 tornadoes (2010–2019)
- 2011 Super Outbreak – A historic tornado outbreak that produced an EF2 tornado in Vilonia 3 years prior
- 2025 Diaz tornado – Another high-end EF4 tornado that struck northeastern Arkansas nearly 11 years later
- 2008 Atkins–Clinton tornado – Another devastating EF4 tornado that carved a long path across central and northern Arkansas over 6 years prior
- 2023 Little Rock tornado – An EF3 tornado that moved directly through Little Rock nine years later, causing less casualties but more insured losses

== References and notes ==
=== Sources ===
- Tanner, Larry J.; Kiesling, Ernst W. "Analysis of the Above-ground Shelter Door Failure: April 27, 2014 Tornado, Mayflower, Arkansas" (PDF). National Wind Institute Debris Impact Facility. Texas Tech University.
- Marshall, Timothy P.; Robinson, John; Kiesling, Ernst; Tanner, Larry. "Damage survey of the Mayflower-Vilonia Arkansas tornado: 27 April 2014". National Wind Institute. Texas Tech University; Irving, Texas – via Academia.
