= Kariyevo =

Kariyevo Кариево
- Selo
- Location within Bashkortostan Location within Russia
- Coordinates: 56°01′N 54°25′E
- Country: Russia
- Region: Bashkortostan
- District: Krasnokamsky District
- Time zone: UTC+5:00

Kariyevo (Russian: Кариево; Bashkir: Ҡарый, Qarıy) is a rural locality (a selo) and the administrative centre of Kariyevsky Selsoviet, Krasnokamsky District, Bashkortostan, Russia. The population was 505 as of 2010. There are 7 streets.

== Geography ==
Kariyevo is located 22 km southeast of Nikolo-Beryozovka (the district's administrative centre) by road. Kangulovo is the nearest rural locality.
