= Pilger, Nebraska =

Village in Stanton County, Nebraska, United States

- Village
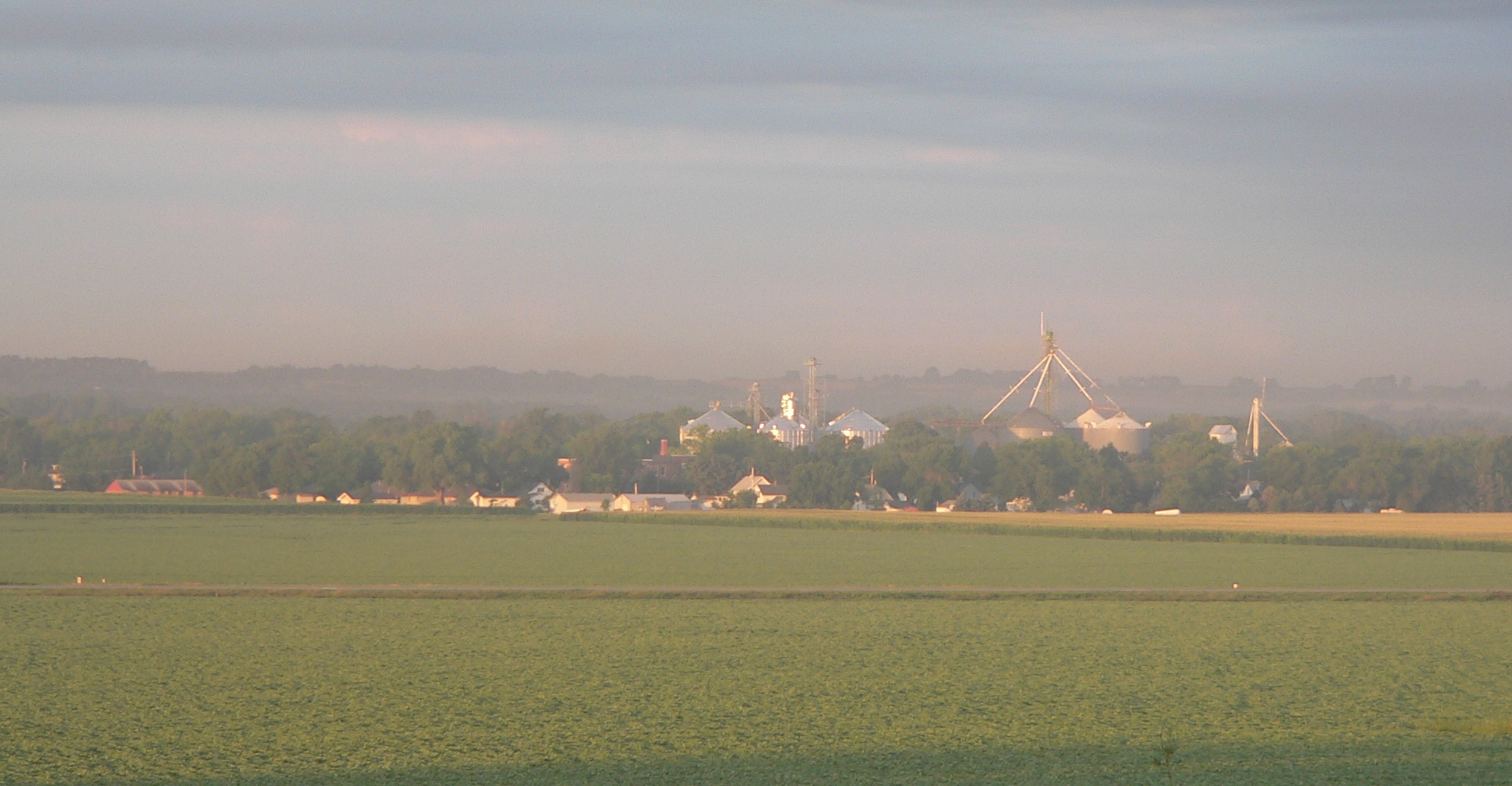
- Pilger at sunrise, 2010

- Location of Pilger within Stanton County and Nebraska
- Coordinates: 42°0′31″N 97°3′14″W
- Country: United States
- State: Nebraska
- County: Stanton
- Platted: 1880
- Incorporated: 1887

Area
  - Total: 0.29 sq mi (0.76 km^{2})
  - Land: 0.29 sq mi (0.76 km^{2})
  - Water: 0 sq mi (0.00 km^{2})
- Elevation: 1,407 ft (429 m)

Population (2020)
  - Total: 240
  - Density: 813.6/sq mi (314.14/km^{2})
- Time zone: UTC-6 (CST)
  - Summer (DST): UTC-5 (CDT)
- ZIP code: 68768
- Area code: 402
- FIPS code: 31-39135
- GNIS feature ID: 2399674

Pilger is a village in Stanton County, Nebraska, United States. As of the 2020 census, Pilger had a population of 240. It is located approximately 85 miles northwest of Omaha.

== History ==
Pilger was platted in 1880 when the railroad was extended to that point. It was named after Peter Pilger, the owner of the original townsite. Pilger was incorporated as a village in 1887. By the 1970s, the future of railroad service came into question. The Chicago & North Western had been experiencing mildly declining freight traffic. Ultimately, railroad service ended in 1982, after flooding from the nearby Elkhorn River damaged many section of the track. Abandonment was applied for & granted that same year & the tracks were removed in 1985.

=== 2014 tornadoes ===
Shortly after 4 p.m. on June 16, 2014, the town was struck by an EF4 tornado. Two people, including a five-year-old girl, were killed, and sixteen were critically injured. Another tornado, also rated EF4, passed just east of the town. Pilger was left devastated, and it was later estimated that over half of the buildings were destroyed or severely damaged.

== Geography ==
According to the United States Census Bureau, the village has a total area of 0.30 square miles (0.78 km^{2}), all land.

== Demographics ==
Historical population
Census	Pop.	Note	%±
1880	11		—
1890	162		1,372.7%
1900	250		54.3%
1910	471		88.4%
1920	563		19.5%
1930	578		2.7%
1940	537		−7.1%
1950	512		−4.7%
1960	491		−4.1%
1970	470		−4.3%
1980	400		−14.9%
1990	361		−9.7%
2000	378		4.7%
2010	352		−6.9%
2020	240		−31.8%
U.S. Decennial Census

Pilger is part of the Norfolk, Nebraska Micropolitan Statistical Area.

=== 2010 census ===
As of the census of 2010, there were 352 people, 159 households, and 97 families residing in the village. The population density was 1,173.3 inhabitants per square mile (453.0/km^{2}). There were 186 housing units at an average density of 620.0 per square mile (239.4/km^{2}). The racial makeup of the village was 95.5% White, 0.6% Native American, 1.7% from other races, and 2.3% from two or more races. Hispanic or Latino of any race were 4.3% of the population.

There were 159 households, of which 26.4% had children under the age of 18 living with them, 47.2% were married couples living together, 7.5% had a female householder with no husband present, 6.3% had a male householder with no wife present, and 39.0% were non-families. 35.8% of all households were made up of individuals, and 20.1% had someone living alone who was 65 years of age or older. The average household size was 2.21 and the average family size was 2.85.

The median age in the village was 43.3 years. 23.9% of residents were under the age of 18; 5.1% were between the ages of 18 and 24; 23.3% were from 25 to 44; 25.6% were from 45 to 64; and 22.2% were 65 years of age or older. The gender makeup of the village was 49.7% male and 50.3% female.

=== 2000 census ===
As of the census of 2000, there were 378 people, 164 households, and 106 families residing in the village. The population density was 1,244.9 inhabitants per square mile (480.7/km^{2}). There were 183 housing units at an average density of 602.7 per square mile (232.7/km^{2}). The racial makeup of the village was 97.62% White, 0.53% Native American, 0.79% from other races, and 1.06% from two or more races. Hispanic or Latino of any race were 1.85% of the population.

There were 164 households, out of which 29.9% had children under the age of 18 living with them, 51.8% were married couples living together, 7.3% had a female householder with no husband present, and 34.8% were non-families. 30.5% of all households were made up of individuals, and 15.2% had someone living alone who was 65 years of age or older. The average household size was 2.30 and the average family size was 2.87.

In the village, the population was spread out, with 24.9% under the age of 18, 6.3% from 18 to 24, 25.9% from 25 to 44, 23.3% from 45 to 64, and 19.6% who were 65 years of age or older. The median age was 40 years. For every 100 females, there were 91.9 males. For every 100 females age 18 and over, there were 90.6 males.

As of 2000 the median income for a household in the village was $31,364, and the median income for a family was $41,500. Males had a median income of $27,273 versus $18,750 for females. The per capita income for the village was $18,178. About 3.8% of families and 7.4% of the population were below the poverty line, including 9.5% of those under age 18 and 13.1% of those age 65 or over.

== Climate ==
This climatic region is typified by large seasonal temperature differences, with warm to hot (and often humid) summers and cold (sometimes severely cold) winters. According to the Köppen Climate Classification system, Pilger has a humid continental climate, abbreviated "Dfa" on climate maps.

Climate data for Pilger, Nebraska
Month	Jan	Feb	Mar	Apr	May	Jun	Jul	Aug	Sep	Oct	Nov	Dec	Year
Mean daily maximum °C (°F)	0 (32)	2 (36)	9 (48)	17 (63)	23 (73)	28 (82)	31 (88)	30 (86)	25 (77)	19 (66)	9 (49)	2 (35)	16 (61)
Mean daily minimum °C (°F)	−12 (10)	−10 (14)	−4 (25)	3 (37)	9 (48)	14 (58)	17 (63)	16 (61)	11 (51)	4 (39)	−4 (25)	−9 (15)	3 (37)
Average precipitation mm (inches)	15 (0.6)	20 (0.8)	41 (1.6)	64 (2.5)	97 (3.8)	110 (4.4)	89 (3.5)	76 (3)	66 (2.6)	41 (1.6)	28 (1.1)	20 (0.8)	670 (26.4)
Source: Weatherbase

== Notable people ==
- Bud Tinning, major league baseball player who pitched four seasons, for the St. Louis Cardinals and Chicago Cubs, during the 1930s

== See also ==
- List of municipalities in Nebraska
- Nebraska locations by per capita income
- Siouxland
- U.S. Route 275
