= List of United States tornadoes from June to July 2014 =

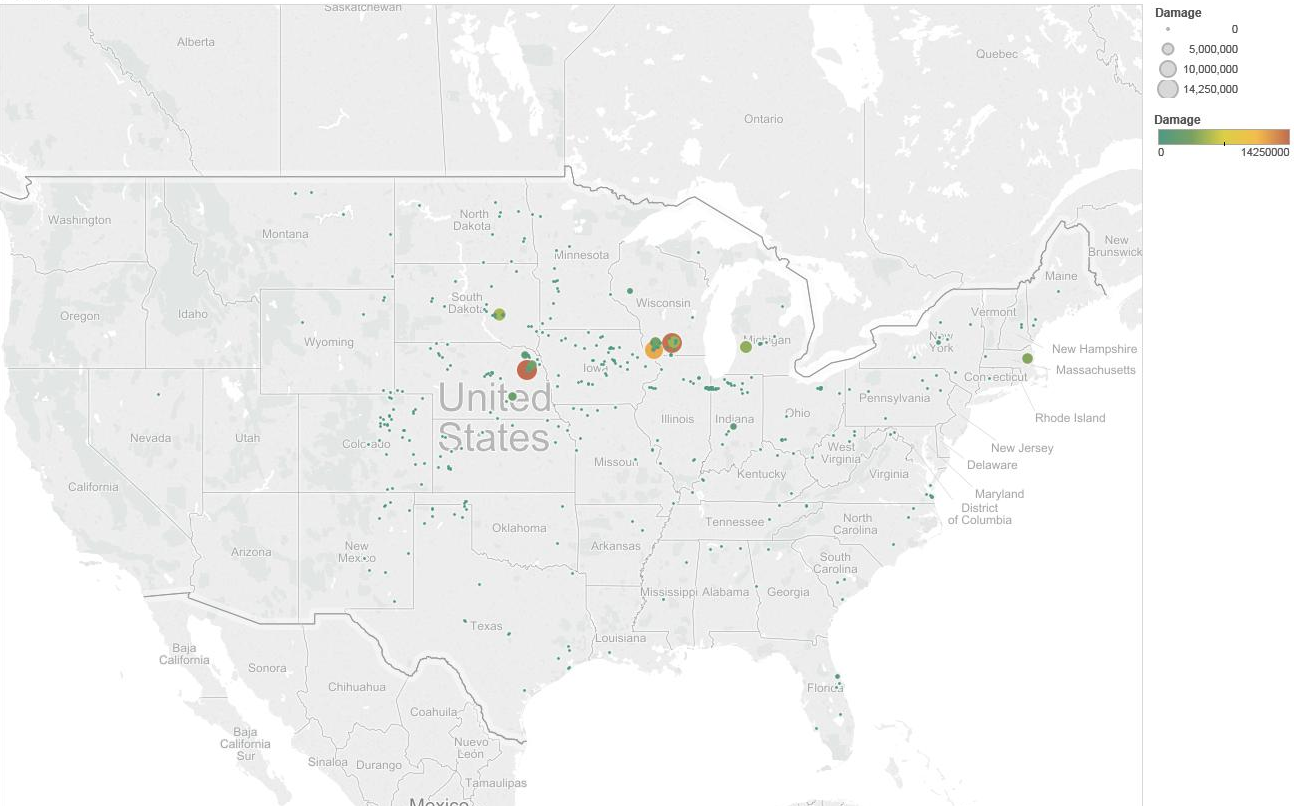
United States tornadoes from June to July 2014

This is a list of all tornadoes that were confirmed by local offices of the National Weather Service in the United States in June and July 2014.

== United States yearly total ==
Confirmed tornadoes by Enhanced Fujita rating
EFU	EF0	EF1	EF2	EF3	EF4	EF5	Total
0	510	321	71	20	7	0	929

== June ==
Confirmed tornadoes by Enhanced Fujita rating
EFU	EF0	EF1	EF2	EF3	EF4	EF5	Total
0	156	100	18	4	5	0	283

=== June 1 event ===
List of confirmed tornadoes – Sunday, June 2, 2014 (Note: All dates are based on the local time zone where the tornado touched down; however, all times are in Coordinated Universal Time for consistency.)
EF#	Location	County / Parish	State	Start Coord.	Time (UTC)	Path length	Max width	Damage (Note: All damage totals are in 2014 USD unless otherwise stated.)	Summary	Refs
EF0	ESE of Buffalo Center	Winnebago	IA	43.3731°N 93.931°W	1742–1744	1.08 mi (1.74 km)	25 yd (23 m)	$0	A brief landspout occurred to the southeast of Buffalo Center on leading edge of storm.	
EF0	S of Courtland	Republic	KS	39.77°N 97.9°W	2243–2245	0.09 mi (0.14 km)	50 yd (46 m)	$0	A brief tornado that caused only minor damage to trees.	
EF0	N of Talmo	Republic	KS	39.7145°N 97.58°W	2312	0.01 mi (0.016 km)	25 yd (23 m)	$0	A brief tornado caused minor tree damage.	
EF0	SSE of Persis	Cass	ND	46.85°N 97.29°W	2321–2322	0.1 mi (0.16 km)	25 yd (23 m)	$0	A brief tornado touched down over an open field	
EF0	WNW of Jamestown	Stutsman	ND	46.98°N 98.94°W	0003–0005	0.04 mi (0.064 km)	20 yd (18 m)	$0	A brief tornado touched down over an open field	

=== June 2 event ===
List of confirmed tornadoes – Monday, June 2, 2014
EF#	Location	County / Parish	State	Start Coord.	Time (UTC)	Path length	Max width	Damage	Summary	Refs
EF1	ESE of Reidland	McCracken	KY	37.0083°N 88.5071°W	0215–0218	1.53 mi (2.46 km)	150 yd (140 m)	$40,000	A pole barn sustained substantial roof damage with debris blown half a mile away; a nearby home lost most of its roof shingles. Dozens of tree limbs were snapped as well.	

=== June 3 event ===
List of confirmed tornadoes – Tuesday, June 3, 2014
EF#	Location	County / Parish	State	Start Coord.	Time (UTC)	Path length	Max width	Damage	Summary	Refs
EF0	S of Dickie	Hot Springs	WY	43.7665°N 108.8642°W	1807–1812	2.21 mi (3.56 km)	30 yd (27 m)	$0	A tornado touched down over open fields and caused no damage.	
EF0	NW of Elyria	Valley	NE	41.7341°N 99.0582°W	2118–2121	1.15 mi (1.85 km)	50 yd (46 m)	$50,000	An irrigation pivot was damaged and a power pole was snapped.	
EF0	N of Greeley	Greeley	NE	41.6372°N 98.5321°W	2201	0.01 mi (0.016 km)	25 yd (23 m)	$0	Brief tornado as observed by storm spotters.	
EF2	W of Oakland	Pottawattamie	IA	41.3174°N 95.5606°W	2202–2205	2.81 mi (4.52 km)	680 yd (620 m)	Unknown	Tornado destroyed a garage, a barn, and severely damaged several sheds. A shed was completely destroyed and numerous trees were downed near the end of the path.	
EF0	NNW of Lake McKinney	Kearny	KS	38.11°N 101.26°W	0120–0121	0.7 mi (1.1 km)	50 yd (46 m)	$0	A brief tornado touched down over an open field.	
EF3	Bern area	Nemaha	KS	39.96°N 96.05°W	0330–0343	6.33 mi (10.19 km)	500 yd (460 m)	Unknown	West of town, mainly EF0 damage occurred as an old barn was destroyed and trees were damaged. EF1 damage occurred as a warehouse building lost its roof. High-end EF2 damage was noted south of town where a house lost its roof and some exterior walls. EF3 damage occurred as a well-anchored, but small and poorly constructed home was leveled. Numerous outbuildings were destroyed further along the path before the tornado dissipated.	
EF1	N of Hampton	Hamilton	NE	40.9207°N 97.903°W	0333–0340	4.12 mi (6.63 km)	700 yd (640 m)	$2,500,000	A frame home and a manufactured home lost parts of their roofs. Leaves and mud were plastered on the east side of both homes.	
EF1	E of Willis to N of Everest	Brown	KS	39.72°N 95.49°W	0424–0430	2.62 mi (4.22 km)	200 yd (180 m)	Unknown	Empty coal cars were derailed, and a garage was destroyed. Several outbuildings were damaged.	

=== June 4 event ===
List of confirmed tornadoes – Wednesday, June 4, 2014
EF#	Location	County / Parish	State	Start Coord.	Time (UTC)	Path length	Max width	Damage	Summary	Refs
EF0	SE of Kane	Jersey	IL	39.17°N 90.31°W	1025–1026	1.44 mi (2.32 km)	30 yd (27 m)	Unknown	A house had shingles removed and a garage wall pushed in. Branches and treetops were snapped as well.	
EF0	N of McGaw	Scioto	OH	38.6429°N 83.2194°W	1555–1557	1.24 mi (2.00 km)	300 yd (270 m)	$100,000	Numerous trees and power lines were downed, homes sustained roof and siding damage, and outbuildings were damaged as well.	
EF0	S of Lynchburg	Highland	OH	39.1906°N 83.8202°W	1940–1946	4.11 mi (6.61 km)	200 yd (180 m)	$300,000	A high school sustained minor damage, along with its athletic field and vehicles in the parking lot. An unanchored shed and a garage were destroyed, with debris from the shed scattered up to 1000 feet away. Other outbuildings sustained lesser damage. A house sustained roof damage, a mobile home had a window and air conditioner blown out, fencing was downed, and a trampoline was tossed into a tree. Extensive tree damage occurred along much of the path.	
EF0	E of Bennett	Adams	CO	39.76°N 104.40°W	2201	0.1 mi (0.16 km)	50 yd (46 m)	$0	A brief tornado touched down over an open field.	
EF1	SE of Sturgis	Union	KY	37.5398°N 87.9671°W	2316–2320	1.14 mi (1.83 km)	100 yd (91 m)	$20,000	Multiple trees were snapped and uprooted, a few homes sustained minor damage, and two outbuildings were destroyed. One of the outbuildings was thrown 75 yards into trees.	
EF0	W of Mt. Olivet	Robertson	KY	38.547356°N 84.080239°W	2324–2325	0.6 mi (0.97 km)	60 yd (55 m)		Tornado damaged the siding of a house and caused sporadic tree damage. A barn lost part of its roof as well.	
EF1	E of Sullivan	Union, Webster	KY	37.504°N 87.914°W	2330–2334	1.08 mi (1.74 km)	75 yd (69 m)	$14,000	Several trees were snapped and uprooted, and a barn was damaged.	
EF1	N of Ona	Cabell	WV	38.4780°N 82.2242°W	0130–0132	0.51 mi (0.82 km)	400 yd (370 m)	$30,000	Numerous trees were snapped, including one that landed on a home and caused significant structural damage.	
EF0	S of Last Chance	Lincoln	CO	39.56°N 103.58°W	0215	0.1 mi (0.16 km)	50 yd (46 m)	$0	A brief tornado touched down over an open field.	
EF1	E of Limon	Lincoln	CO	39.27°N 103.65°W	0415–0425	5.24 mi (8.43 km)	200 yd (180 m)	$0	A large, multiple-vortex tornado was observed by storm chasers over mostly open fields. One highway sign was blown down and uprooted.	
EF0	S of Arriba	Lincoln	CO	39.14°N 103.27°W	0444–0450	3.39 mi (5.46 km)	100 yd (91 m)	$0	A brief tornado touched down over an open field.	

=== June 5 event ===
List of confirmed tornadoes – Thursday, June 5, 2014
EF#	Location	County / Parish	State	Start Coord.	Time (UTC)	Path length	Max width	Damage	Summary	Refs
EF0	E of Hartford	Minnehaha	SD	43.63°N 96.9°W	1914–1915	0.17 mi (0.27 km)	50 yd (46 m)	$0	A brief tornado that caused no damage.	
EF1	NNW of Walthill	Thurston	NE	42.1761°N 96.5012°W	1951–1956	1.49 mi (2.40 km)	100 yd (91 m)	Unknown	A short-lived tornado caused significant damage to a farmstead.	
EF0	SE of Harrisburg	Lincoln	SD	43.41°N 96.664°W	2040–2041	0.4 mi (0.64 km)	50 yd (46 m)	$0	A brief tornado that caused no damage.	
EF0	SW of Straubville	Sargent	ND	46.0193°N 97.9442°W	2125–2126	0.1 mi (0.16 km)	10 yd (9.1 m)	$0	A brief tornado that caused no damage.	
EF1	S of Tanner	Limestone	AL	34.7135°N 86.9759°W	2134–2136	0.74 mi (1.19 km)	100 yd (91 m)	Unknown	A few houses sustained minor roof or siding damage. Two sheds were destroyed and a porch pillar was pushed over.	
EF0	SE of Chaffee	Cass	ND	46.7493°N 97.3052°W	2202–2203	0.1 mi (0.16 km)	10 yd (9.1 m)	$0	A brief tornado that caused no damage.	
EF0	WNW of Luverne	Rock	MN	43.71°N 96.32°W	2205–2206	0.25 mi (0.40 km)	50 yd (46 m)	$0	A brief tornado that caused no damage.	
EF0	NE of Roundtop	Gilmer	GA	34.6123°N 84.5534°W	2321–2324	0.28 mi (0.45 km)	50 yd (46 m)	$50,000	A brief tornado uprooted 20 trees.	
EF0	SE of Chandler	Rock	MN	43.92°N 95.94°W	2349–2350	0.77 mi (1.24 km)	50 yd (46 m)	$0	A brief tornado that caused no damage.	
EF0	NNW of Hasty	Bent	CO	38.1625°N 102.9754°W	0207–0209	0.42 mi (0.68 km)	50 yd (46 m)	$0	A brief tornado that caused no damage.	

=== June 6 event ===
List of confirmed tornadoes – Friday, June 6, 2014
EF#	Location	County / Parish	State	Start Coord.	Time (UTC)	Path length	Max width	Damage	Summary	Refs
EF0	SE of Gordon	Sheridan	NE	42.78°N 102.16°W	1805	0.2 mi (0.32 km)	40 yd (37 m)	$0	A brief tornado lifted a tarp and wrapped it around a nearby power pole.	
EF0	WNW of Cody	Cherry	NE	42.9425°N 101.2826°W	1900	0.2 mi (0.32 km)	40 yd (37 m)	$0	A brief tornado touched down over an open field.	
EF1	ESE of Trinidad (1st tornado)	Las Animas	CO	37.1532°N 104.4111°W	1951–2029	8.58 mi (13.81 km)	400 yd (370 m)	$5,000	A large tornado remained over mostly open fields. Some trees were downed and an outbuilding was damaged.	
EF0	S of Bushnell	Kimball	NE	41.13°N 103.89°W	1955–2000	0.91 mi (1.46 km)	25 yd (23 m)	$0	A brief tornado touched down over an open field.	
EF0	S of Hereford	Weld	CO	40.87°N 104.30°W	1956–1958	0.1 mi (0.16 km)	50 yd (46 m)	$0	A brief tornado touched down over an open field.	
EF0	E of Roggen	Weld	CO	40.17°N 104.33°W	2020–2035	0.5 mi (0.80 km)	100 yd (91 m)	$0	A brief tornado touched down over an open field.	
EF1	N of Batesville	Independence	AR	35.7888°N 91.6408°W	2035–2040	3.26 mi (5.25 km)	75 yd (69 m)	$250,000	Hotels and a child care center had roof damaged and blown-out windows. A flooring company lost its roof and suffered wall damage and another business had its windows blown out. Cars were damaged and piled up in a parking lot. Trees and power lines were downed.	
EF1	ESE of Trinidad	Las Animas	CO	37.1889°N 104.1789°W	2046–2052	1.35 mi (2.17 km)	100 yd (91 m)	$3,000	A tornado caused minor fencing and sign damage along Highway 160.	
EF0	W of Marks Butte	Sedgwick	CO	40.82°N 102.61°W	2053	0.1 mi (0.16 km)	100 yd (91 m)	$0	A brief tornado touched down over an open field.	
EF1	SSW of Beedeville	Jackson	AR	35.4034°N 91.1282°W	2100–2103	2.03 mi (3.27 km)	50 yd (46 m)	$40,000	An old aircraft hangar was badly damage. A shop building was destroyed with debris spread for a quarter mile. Several power poles were blown down	
EF0	N of Abbott	Colfax	NM	36.60°N 104.26°W	2225–2235	0.85 mi (1.37 km)	100 yd (91 m)	$0	A tornado touched down over an open field.	
EF0	WNW of Clovis	Curry	NM	34.45°N 103.32°W	2335–2340	1.24 mi (2.00 km)	50 yd (46 m)	$0	A tornado touched down over an open field.	
EF0	WNW of Lake McKinny	Kearny	KS	37.99°N 101.22°W	2347–2348	0.51 mi (0.82 km)	25 yd (23 m)	$0	A tornado touched down over an open field.	
EF0	WNW of Deerfield	Kearny	KS	37.9843°N 101.1479°W	2358–2359	0.6 mi (0.97 km)	25 yd (23 m)	$0	A tornado touched down over an open field.	
EF0	N of Deerfield	Kearny	KS	38.01°N 101.13°W	2359–0002	0.34 mi (0.55 km)	25 yd (23 m)	$0	A tornado touched down over an open field.	
EF0	WNW of Channing	Hartley	TX	35.71°N 102.50°W	0015–0020	2.46 mi (3.96 km)	25 yd (23 m)	$0	A tornado touched down over an open field.	
EF0	SSE of Bamberg	Bamberg	SC	33.19°N 80.96°W	0046–0048	0.84 mi (1.35 km)	40 yd (37 m)	$4,000	Trees and tree limbs were snapped.	
EF0	SSE of Waka	Ochiltree	TX	36.09°N 100.92°W	0052–0100	1.65 mi (2.66 km)	70 yd (64 m)	$0	A tornado touched down over an open field.	

=== June 7 event ===
List of confirmed tornadoes – Saturday, June 7, 2014
EF#	Location	County / Parish	State	Start Coord.	Time (UTC)	Path length	Max width	Damage	Summary	Refs
EF0	NW of Sedan	Union	NM	36.25°N 103.28°W	1434–1435	0.1 mi (0.16 km)	20 yd (18 m)	$0	A brief tornado touched down over an open field.	
EF0	NE of Owensville	Gasconade	MO	38.36°N 91.48°W	1935–1936	0.05 mi (0.080 km)	20 yd (18 m)	$0	A brief tornado touched down over an open field.	
EF1	WNW of Tyler, KY, to NW of Troy, TN	Fulton (KY), New Madrid (MO), Lake (TN), Obion (TN)	KY, MO, TN	36.5565°N 89.4974°W	1948–2045	18.19 mi (29.27 km)	200 yd (180 m)	$270,000	In Kentucky and Missouri, hundreds of trees were snapped and corn fields were flattened but no structures were damaged. Significant tree damage continued into Tennessee. In Obion County many homes suffered roof damage and some structures suffered significant damage.	
EF0	Harvester area	St. Charles	MO	38.743°N 90.601°W	2056–2104	2.67 mi (4.30 km)	20 yd (18 m)	Unknown	An apartment complex and several homes lost shingles and panels. Cinder blocks were toppled and two overhangs were destroyed at a fitness center. Trees were snapped.	
EF0	WNW of Bridgeton	St. Louis	MO	38.78°N 90.61°W	2114–2118	4.22 mi (6.79 km)	40 yd (37 m)	Unknown		
EF0	E of Maeystown	Monroe	IL	38.23°N 90.16°W	2219–2220	0.34 mi (0.55 km)	40 yd (37 m)	Unknown	A brief tornado downed several trees, one of which caused moderate damage to a home. A barn was also damaged.	
EF0	WSW of Red Bud	Monroe	IL	38.2023°N 90.0563°W	2243–2244	0.3 mi (0.48 km)	30 yd (27 m)	$0	A brief tornado caused minor tree damage.	
EF0	W of Corona	Lincoln	NM	34.23°N 105.62°W	2258–2259	0.25 mi (0.40 km)	50 yd (46 m)	$0	A brief tornado touched down over an open field.	
EF0	W of Corona	Lincoln	NM	34.2501°N 105.6394°W	2314–2316	0.1 mi (0.16 km)	50 yd (46 m)	$0	A brief tornado touched down over an open field.	
EF0	N of Roswell	Chaves	NM	33.59°N 104.53°W	0125–0130	3.73 mi (6.00 km)	50 yd (46 m)	$0	A tornado was observed by storm chasers over an open field.	

=== June 8 event ===
List of confirmed tornadoes – Sunday, June 8, 2014
EF#	Location	County / Parish	State	Start Coord.	Time (UTC)	Path length	Max width	Damage	Summary	Refs
EF1	ENE of Crowder	Troup	GA	33.0113°N 85.1496°W	0559–0603	1.8 mi (2.9 km)	280 yd (260 m)	$150,000	Trees were snapped and uprooted, crushing three cars and damaging houses. A greenhouse was destroyed and some houses suffered shingle and siding damage.	
EF1	SSW of Fairplay	Park	CO	39.113°N 105.0572°W	1655–1704	0.25 mi (0.40 km)	100 yd (91 m)	Unknown	A tornado traveled mostly over open country. The roof of one home was damaged.	
EF0	SE of Fairplay	Park	CO	39.1586°N 104.9208°W	1706–1715	0.1 mi (0.16 km)	50 yd (46 m)	$0	A tornado touched down over open fields.	
EF2	W of Lake George	Park, Teller	CO	38.98°N 105.43°W	1832–1902	6.33 mi (10.19 km)	150 yd (140 m)	Unknown	A tornado struck an RV park near Lake George, damaging several structures. Trees and power lines were downed along its path.	
EF0	S of Grover	Weld	CO	40.84°N 104.23°W	1854	0.1 mi (0.16 km)	50 yd (46 m)	$0	The tornado remained over open country. No damage was reported.	
EF1	Aurora area	Arapahoe	CO	39.70°N 104.81°W	1858	0.25 mi (0.40 km)	100 yd (91 m)	Unknown	A construction trailer and golf course were damaged. One person was injured.	
EF0	NE of Carpenter	Laramie	WY	41.0688°N 104.2551°W	1900–1905	0.54 mi (0.87 km)	25 yd (23 m)	Unknown	A weak tornado produced a swirling path in a grassy area. Three outbuildings suffered minor roof damage and at east two trees were partially uprooted with broken limbs. Tumbleweeds were lofted into power lines.	
EF0	ENE of Palmer Lake	Douglas	CO	39.14°N 104.82°W	1912	0.1 mi (0.16 km)	50 yd (46 m)	$0	The tornado remained over open country	
EF0	SSE of Roggen	Weld	CO	40.12°N 104.34°W	1917	0.1 mi (0.16 km)	50 yd (46 m)	$0	The tornado moved over open country	
EF0	Rural Elbert County	Elbert	CO	40.01°N 104.20°W	1943	0.1 mi (0.16 km)	50 yd (46 m)	$0	The tornado moved over open country	
EF0	SSE of Bennett	Arapahoe	CO	39.55°N 104.32°W	1943	0.1 mi (0.16 km)	50 yd (46 m)	$0	The tornado briefly touched down in open country.	
EF1	E of Ecinoso	Lincoln	NM	33.7°N 105.3805°W	2023–2031	1.75 mi (2.82 km)	160 yd (150 m)	$100,000	The tornado initially touched down in an open desert area and traveled east southeast down Richardson Canyon Road, snapping off the tops and many branches off of numerous trees. The tornado intensified as it approached two homes, completely destroying a single wide mobile home and tossing a double wide mobile home into a barn. At least two other homes and several other barns and sheds sustained damage.	
EF0	NNE of Shoemaker	Mora	NM	35.91°N 104.83°W	2145–2150	2.82 mi (4.54 km)	50 yd (46 m)	$0	A small tornado crossed Interstate 25; no damaged occurred.	
EF0	N of Springer	Colfax	NM	36.44°N 104.59°W	2235–2240	1.39 mi (2.24 km)	50 yd (46 m)	$0	A brief landspout that caused no damage.	
EF0	S of Maxwell	Colfax	NM	36.47°N 104.54°W	2240–2245	1.08 mi (1.74 km)	50 yd (46 m)	$0	A brief tornado touched down over open fields.	
EF1	Martinsburg	Berkeley	WV	39.456°N 77.981°W	0041–0044	1 mi (1.6 km)	100 yd (91 m)	$30,000	A section of porch roof was lifted from on residence. Scattered tree damage occurred, with two trees falling on a house. Dozens of trees were snapped or topped off at the grounds of a manor. A large HVAC panel was embedded in the ground.	
EF0	E of Otis	Eddy	NM	32.35°N 104.0843°W	0105–0106	0.22 mi (0.35 km)	200 yd (180 m)	$0	A brief tornado touched down over open fields.	

=== June 9 event ===
List of confirmed tornadoes – Monday, June 9, 2014
EF#	Location	County / Parish	State	Start Coord.	Time (UTC)	Path length	Max width	Damage	Summary	Refs
EF0	Avery	Red River	TX	33.5532°N 94.7735°W	1316–1321	1.71 mi (2.75 km)	200 yd (180 m)	$10,000	Numerous trees snapped and a school gym roof was damaged. The roof of the dugout on the baseball field was ripped off and an outhouse was overturned.	
EF1	W of Old Bethel to NNE of Wolf Springs	Colbert, Lawrence	AL	34.5822°N 87.5607°W	0130–0135	5.86 mi (9.43 km)	150 yd (140 m)	Unknown	Several hardwood trees were snapped, twisted, or uprooted. A large outbuilding was destroyed and another was heavily damaged. Several homes sustained minor shingle damage, and one house lost its awning. A utility pole was snapped.	
EF0	SSW of Providence	Orangeburg	SC	33.3226°N 80.5837°W	0217–0219	1.87 mi (3.01 km)	75 yd (69 m)	Unknown	A brief tornado caused minor tree damage.	

=== June 10 event ===
List of confirmed tornadoes – Tuesday, June 10, 2014
EF#	Location	County / Parish	State	Start Coord.	Time (UTC)	Path length	Max width	Damage	Summary	Refs
EF1	SSE of Scottsboro	Jackson	AL	34.6437°N 86.0211°W	1844–1856	8.4 mi (13.5 km)	300 yd (270 m)	Unknown	Hundreds of trees and numerous power poles were snapped or downed. Two sheds were damaged and two mobile homes were pushed off their foundations. A few homes sustained minor roof damage.	
EF0	NE of Kingston	Roane	TN	35.88°N 84.51°W	2106–2107	0.5 mi (0.80 km)	100 yd (91 m)	$50,000	A small tornado formed just east of downtown Kingston and moved to the northeast. Hundreds of trees were downed.	
EF0	ENE of Plummer	Greene	IN	38.9889°N 86.94°W	2323–2324	0.5 mi (0.80 km)	25 yd (23 m)	$0	A brief tornado that caused no damage.	

=== June 11 event ===
List of confirmed tornadoes – Wednesday, June 11, 2014
EF#	Location	County / Parish	State	Start Coord.	Time (UTC)	Path length	Max width	Damage	Summary	Refs
EF0	ENE of Devils Lake	Ramsey	ND	48.11°N 98.81°W	1814–1817	0.4 mi (0.64 km)	30 yd (27 m)	$0	A brief tornado touched down over open fields.	
EF0	NE of Tribune	Greeley	KS	38.5212°N 101.6846°W	2154–2157	0.1 mi (0.16 km)	10 yd (9.1 m)	$0	A brief tornado touched down over open fields.	
EF1	SE of Brant Township to SE of St. Charles	Saginaw	MI	43.24°N 84.21°W	2155–2208	5.3 mi (8.5 km)	300 yd (270 m)	$250,000	Several large trees were uprooted, and many more were damaged severely, some of which fell on adjacent dwellings. Some minor to moderate structural damage was also observed, consisting mainly of partially lost roofs, blown out garage doors and destruction of out buildings. Additional EF0 damage was observed across M-52 north of Ring and continued to near Sharon on the far south side of St. Charles.	
EF1	E of Lutzville to Hopewell area	Bedford	PA	40.02°N 78.42°W	2310–2320	10.98 mi (17.67 km)	100 yd (91 m)	$2,500	Intermittent tornado snapped or uprooted hundreds of trees and damaged two homes.	
EF1	E of Blue Grass	Wadena	MN	46.5538°N 94.9473°W	2315–2318	1 mi (1.6 km)	10 yd (9.1 m)	$0	A number of 18 in (46 cm) were snapped.	
EF1	NE of Langford	Marshall	SD	45.6587°N 97.6692°W	2318–2319	0.1 mi (0.16 km)	50 yd (46 m)	Unknown	A large, garage sustained substantial roof damage with a large portion of the roof blown off on the southern side. A smaller, wooden garage nearby was almost completely destroyed with debris flying almost 100 yards to the southeast.	
EF1	N of Selkirk	Logan	KS	38.7119°N 101.0978°W	0058–0102	0.1 mi (0.16 km)	25 yd (23 m)	$50,000	Tornado destroyed a garage and barn.	
EF0	ENE of San Angelo	Tom Green	TX	31.49°N 100.39°W	0120–0121	0.69 mi (1.11 km)	50 yd (46 m)	Unknown	A brief tornado damaged roofs, trees, signs, and fences.	
EF0	NE of Goodfellow Air Force Base	Tom Green	TX	31.4479°N 100.378°W	0124–0125	0.59 mi (0.95 km)	75 yd (69 m)	$0	A brief tornado that caused no damage.	

=== June 12 event ===
List of confirmed tornadoes – Thursday, June 12, 2014
EF#	Location	County / Parish	State	Start Coord.	Time (UTC)	Path length	Max width	Damage	Summary	Refs
EF0	WSW of Oakalla	Burnet	TX	30.9321°N 98.0402°W	0118–0119	0.12 mi (0.19 km)	50 yd (46 m)	$0	A brief tornado that caused minor tree damage.	
EF2	ESE of Lake Victor	Burnet	TX	30.8685°N 98.0875°W	0125–0129	1.68 mi (2.70 km)	100 yd (91 m)	$200,000	A brief tornado caused significant damage to one home, moving it 100 yd (91 m) off its foundation. Five people sheltered in a bathroom sustained minor injuries. Another home sustained minor damage.	
EF1	WNW of Okolona	Chickasaw	MS	34.0312°N 88.8194°W	0330–0340	1.29 mi (2.08 km)	200 yd (180 m)	$100,000	A tornado snapped or uprooted many trees, some of which fell on homes. One person sustained minor injuries.	

=== June 13 event ===
List of confirmed tornadoes – Friday, June 13, 2014
EF#	Location	County / Parish	State	Start Coord.	Time (UTC)	Path length	Max width	Damage	Summary	Refs
EF2	NNE of Hulett to NNW of Aladdin	Crook	WY	44.714°N 104.573°W	2241–2314	16.61 mi (26.73 km)	530 yd (480 m)	$100,000	A significant number of large ponderosa pine trees were uprooted and snapped. One mobile home was completely destroyed. Several outbuildings were damaged or destroyed. One person was injured.	
EF0	WSW of Chinook	Blaine	MT	48.43°N 109.23°W	2245	0.25 mi (0.40 km)	10 yd (9.1 m)	$0	A brief tornado touched down over an open field.	

=== June 14 event ===
List of confirmed tornadoes – Saturday, June 14, 2014
EF#	Location	County / Parish	State	Start Coord.	Time (UTC)	Path length	Max width	Damage	Summary	Refs
EF1	NW of Webster	Rooks	KS	39.4611°N 99.4606°W	2227–2234	1 mi (1.6 km)	110 yd (100 m)	$10,000	Power poles were knocked down and fencing was damaged.	
EF0	NNE of Limon	Lincoln	CO	39.56°N 103.53°W	2311	0.1 mi (0.16 km)	50 yd (46 m)	$0	A brief tornado that caused no damage.	
EF0	SSW of Hildreth	Franklin	NE	40.2937°N 99.0621°W	0031–0039	1.19 mi (1.92 km)	75 yd (69 m)	$0	No reported damage.	
EF0	SSW of Inavale	Webster	NE	40.0516°N 98.6851°W	0125–0127	0.27 mi (0.43 km)	25 yd (23 m)	$0	No reported damage.	
EF0	SW of Giltner	Hamilton	NE	40.7197°N 98.2167°W	0305–0306	0.01 mi (0.016 km)	25 yd (23 m)	$0	A brief tornado that caused no damage.	
EF0	SW of Giltner	Hamilton	NE	40.7197°N 98.2167°W	0324–0325	0.01 mi (0.016 km)	25 yd (23 m)	$0	A brief tornado that caused no damage.	

=== June 15 event ===
List of confirmed tornadoes – Sunday, June 15, 2014
EF#	Location	County / Parish	State	Start Coord.	Time (UTC)	Path length	Max width	Damage	Summary
EF0	NW of Peculiar	Cass	MO	38.7347°N 94.5357°W	0917–0922	2.9 mi (4.7 km)	25 yd (23 m)	Unknown	A brief tornado that caused minor roof damage.

=== June 16 event ===
List of confirmed tornadoes – Monday, June 16, 2014
EF#	Location	County / Parish	State	Start Coord.	Time (UTC)	Path length	Max width	Damage	Summary
EF0	ENE of Madison	Stanton	NE	41.8596°N 97.3602°W	2038 – 2040	1.25 mi (2.01 km)	100 yd (91 m)	$0	See article on this tornado family
EF4	SW of Stanton to N of Stanton	Stanton	NE	41.893°N 97.33°W	2042 – 2111	12.11 mi (19.49 km)	400 yd (370 m)	$2,250,000	See article on this tornado family
EF0	NNE of Alvord	Lyon	IA	43.37°N 96.31°W	2043 – 2044	0.2 mi (0.32 km)	50 yd (46 m)	$0	A brief tornado caused no reported damage.
EF4	E of Stanton to Pilger to E of Altona	Stanton, Cuming, Wayne	NE	41.9528°N 97.1369°W	2100 – 2146	23.94 mi (38.53 km)	500 yd (460 m)	$14,250,000	1 death – See article on this tornado family
EF4	SSE of Pilger to ENE of Altona	Stanton, Cuming, Wayne	NE	41.9742°N 97.04°W	2113 – 2139	11.5 mi (18.5 km)	500 yd (460 m)	$1,375,000	1 death – See article on this tornado family
EF4	E of Altona to NNE of Wakefield	Wayne, Dixon	NE	42.127°N 96.8686°W	2140 – 2208	15.84 mi (25.49 km)	530 yd (480 m)	$3,050,000	See article on this tornado family
EF0	SSW of Hubbard	Dakota	NE	42.36°N 96.59°W	2241 – 2242	0.26 mi (0.42 km)	50 yd (46 m)	$0	See article on this tornado family
EF0	N of Plover to WSW of West Bend	Pocahontas, Palo Alto	IA	42.8956°N 94.627°W	2244 – 2255	6.09 mi (9.80 km)	250 yd (230 m)	$10,000	Damage was limited to crops.
EF0	SW of Hardy	Humboldt	IA	42.7741°N 94.1259°W	2322 – 2330	4.61 mi (7.42 km)	50 yd (46 m)	$10,000	Little damage was observed.
EF0	N of Sargent	Custer	NE	41.6985°N 99.3655°W	2324	0.2 mi (0.32 km)	40 yd (37 m)	$0	A brief touchdown with no damage.
EF1	WSW of Burwell	Garfield	NE	41.7580°N 99.2362°W	2335 – 2340	2.4 mi (3.9 km)	400 yd (370 m)	$15,000	A small building was overturned, a grain bin was blown off its foundation and destroyed, and large tree limbs were downed.
EF1	NNE of Mason City Municipal Airport to NW of Mason City	Cerro Gordo	IA	43.2062°N 93.3101°W	2348 – 2353	3.03 mi (4.88 km)	110 yd (100 m)	$59,000	This tornado caused minor property damage, mainly near the end of its path.
EF1	SW of Meservey to N of Alexander	Wright, Franklin	IA	42.875°N 93.5054°W	2352 – 2356	2.57 mi (4.14 km)	175 yd (160 m)	$30,000	A tornado embedded within a larger swath of straight-line winds damaged trees and farmsteads.
EF0	N of Mason City	Cerro Gordo	IA	43.2216°N 93.2126°W	2356 – 2357	1.1 mi (1.8 km)	40 yd (37 m)	$7,000	An intermittent tornado damaged some trees and a house north of Mason City. A convergent pattern was noted in nearby farm fields.
EF2	NNW of Burwell to NE of Burwell	Garfield	NE	41.8028°N 99.1407°W	0001 – 0015	5.19 mi (8.35 km)	500 yd (460 m)	$100,000	A center irrigation pivot system was overturned, and numerous trees and power poles were snapped.
EF2	ENE of Burwell (1st tornado)	Garfield	NE	41.8397°N 98.9986°W	0020 – 0026	1.56 mi (2.51 km)	700 yd (640 m)	$100,000	Numerous trees were snapped and uprooted, a street sign was bent, and buildings were damaged.
EF2	ENE of Burwell (2nd tornado)	Garfield	NE	41.8348°N 98.9567°W	0028 – 0032	0.3 mi (0.48 km)	400 yd (370 m)	$5,000	Numerous trees were snapped, with a few denuded.
EF0	ENE of Burwell (3rd tornado)	Garfield	NE	41.8295°N 98.9537°W	0030	0.2 mi (0.32 km)	40 yd (37 m)	$1,000	A brief tornado downed several large tree limbs.
EF1	N of Allison to W of Clarksville	Butler	IA	42.7918°N 92.823°W	0039 – 0046	4.71 mi (7.58 km)	100 yd (91 m)	$205,000	Several farmsteads were damaged, with a barn completely destroyed at one of them. Trees in a shelter belt were also heavily damaged.
EF1	ENE of Allison to W of Clarksville	Butler	IA	42.7831°N 92.7498°W	0045 – 0048	1.72 mi (2.77 km)	150 yd (140 m)	$401,000	This tornado formed just south of the previous tornado and damaged a farmstead, destroying outbuildings at that location. Trees in multiple shelter belts were heavily damaged.
EF1	E of Clarksville to N of Shell Rock	Butler	IA	42.7849°N 92.6323°W	0052 – 0055	2.12 mi (3.41 km)	120 yd (110 m)	$202,000	Multiple shelter belts were damaged, along with two homes, one of which lost part of its roof.
EF0	WNW of Tripoli	Bremer	IA	42.8134°N 92.3349°W	0112 – 0116	2 mi (3.2 km)	75 yd (69 m)	$4,000	A brief tornado remained over open fields.
EF0	SW of Dickinson	Stark	ND	46.71°N 102.9°W	0223 – 0227	1.35 mi (2.17 km)	25 yd (23 m)	$0	This tornado remained over open country and caused no damage.
EF1	SSW of Lamont to Southern Edgewood	Buchanan, Delaware	IA	42.5412°N 91.6484°W	0230 – 0255	13.9 mi (22.4 km)	50 yd (46 m)	$150,000	Several grain bins were collapsed or destroyed and two old hog confinements were severely damaged. Numerous trees were snapped as well.
EF0	SSW of Atkins	Benton	IA	41.9792°N 91.8728°W	0305 – 0306	0.07 mi (0.11 km)	30 yd (27 m)	$1,000	A brief tornado left a swath of damage in a corn field. Corn stalks were snapped off at their base.
EF2	Southern Platteville	Grant	WI	42.7376°N 90.5188°W	0345 – 0350	3.76 mi (6.05 km)	100 yd (91 m)	$11,502,000	This was the first of two tornadoes that struck Platteville simultaneously. This one damaged 20 homes and destroyed 12 others, including a split-level home that had its top floor ripped off. Multiple businesses were also damaged, including a gas station that was destroyed. Several buildings had major roof damage and windows blown out at the University of Wisconsin-Platteville Campus, and multiple cars on the property were flipped and damaged. Metal light poles at the stadium were broken. Trees and power lines were downed, and a cemetery was damaged as well. Five people were injured, one seriously.
EF1	Northern Platteville	Grant	WI	42.7521°N 90.4731°W	0349 – 0350	0.49 mi (0.79 km)	50 yd (46 m)	$541,000	This was the second of two tornadoes that struck Platteville simultaneously. The roof was ripped off of an apartment building and some trees were downed.
EF1	N of Leslie to SE of Rewey	Lafayette, Iowa	WI	42.8119°N 90.3672°W	0400 – 0402	1.17 mi (1.88 km)	50 yd (46 m)	$33,000	Many trees were downed or snapped.
EF1	NE of Leslie	Lafayette	WI	42.8054°N 90.3731°W	0400 – 0411	4.35 mi (7.00 km)	200 yd (180 m)	$1,500,000	Numerous trees and power poles were downed, and a large calf barn was nearly completely destroyed, killing two calves. Several pole barns were completely destroyed, and homes sustained minor roof damage. A garage was blown off of its foundation.
EF1	WSW of Mineral Point	Iowa	WI	42.8208°N 90.2636°W	0410 – 0411	0.41 mi (0.66 km)	100 yd (91 m)	$20,000	Numerous large trees were downed and cars were flipped. A chimney was removed from a home, and a small shed sustained roof damage.
EF1	NW of Postville (1st tornado)	Green	WI	42.8157°N 89.7947°W	0436 – 0438	0.4 mi (0.64 km)	125 yd (114 m)	$50,000	Farm buildings sustained major damage, and numerous large trees were downed.
EF1	NW of Postville (2nd tornado)	Green	WI	42.825°N 89.7828°W	0436 – 0438	0.51 mi (0.82 km)	125 yd (114 m)	$200,000	Two homes sustained major damage, and 24 homes sustained minor damage. Numerous large trees were downed as well.

=== June 17 event ===
List of confirmed tornadoes – Tuesday, June 17, 2014
EF#	Location	County / Parish	State / Province	Start Coord.	Time (UTC)	Path length	Max width	Damage	Summary
EF3	Verona	Dane	WI	43.0024°N 89.5579°W	0508 – 0510	0.96 mi (1.54 km)	100 yd (91 m)	$14,000,000	Country View Elementary School and several homes sustained major structural damage, with other homes sustaining lesser damage. Reinforced, load-bearing masonry exterior walls were collapsed at the school. A large storage barn was swept away, with six antique cars stored inside thrown into an adjacent field and destroyed.
EF2	Southwestern Madison	Dane	WI	43.07°N 89.40°W	0515 – 0516	0.22 mi (0.35 km)	200 yd (180 m)	$5,000,000	A brief, but strong tornado touched down in a residential area of southwest Madison, downing numerous trees and power lines and damaging structures. Homes had their roofs torn off on Friar Lane.
EF1	SSW of Maple Bluff	Dane	WI	43.0772°N 89.3696°W	0521 – 0522	1.49 mi (2.40 km)	300 yd (270 m)	$150,000	A tornado began at B.B. Clarke Beach just to the east of downtown Madison and affected the Marquette neighborhood. Numerous trees were snapped and uprooted, some of which landed on homes and cars. Power lines were downed, and a house and a business lost their roofs. Other homes sustained shingle damage and several sailboats were sunk. A canoe and two kayaks were thrown as well.
EF1	ENE of Clarno to SE of Juda	Green	WI	42.5323°N 89.6119°W	0940 – 0948	6.78 mi (10.91 km)	640 yd (590 m)	$300,000	Sheds were destroyed and barns were severely damaged. Numerous large trees were snapped and uprooted.
EF1	Hale	Iosco	MI	44.3722°N 83.8247°W	1557 – 1558	1.58 mi (2.54 km)	100 yd (91 m)	$140,000	High-profile vehicles and numerous power and light poles were blown over in town, considerable tree damage was observed, and several homes and businesses sustained roof damage.
EF3	W of Capitol to Custer National Forest	Carter	MT	45.4783°N 104.1832°W	2027 – 2130	10 mi (16 km)	880 yd (800 m)	Unknown	A trailer home was obliterated, with its frame twisted and tossed over one mile (1.6 km) away. Nearby, an old A-frame schoolhouse was completely destroyed with only its basement left behind. Debris from this structure was thrown 100 yards (91 m). Six nearby cars were found up to 200 yards (180 m) away. Twenty power poles were snapped along the track, one of which was pulled out of the ground. Additionally, 20 hay bales weighing up to 1,500 lb (680 kg) were blown away and not recovered. The tornado continued into Custer National Forest before dissipating. This was the strongest tornado ever recorded in southeastern Montana.
EF2	Angus to Southern Barrie	Simcoe	ON	Unknown	~2120 – 2135	~20 km (12 mi)	Unknown	Unknown	This tornado touched down in Angus, where many homes had their roofs torn off and one lost its second story. A van was flipped as well. Further east, a mobile home park was damaged near Essa. The tornado entered the south side of Barrie and snapped numerous trees and power poles, a few of which landed on homes. Steel shipping containers weighing up to 9,800 lbs were blown more than 20 feet from where they originated before the tornado dissipated. More than 100 residences were damaged along the path, including 30 to 40 with significant damage. Hundreds of trees were downed as well.
EF1	Stroud	Simcoe	ON	Unknown	~2130	0.75 km (0.47 mi)	300 m (330 yd)	Unknown	A tornado lifted a 12-by-15-metre (39 by 49 ft) shed and tossed it 70 metres (230 ft) into a farm home. Numerous trees were also snapped or uprooted.
EF0	NE of Hell Creek State Park	Carter	MT	47.715°N 106.7041°W	2154 – 2158	0.07 mi (0.11 km)	15 yd (14 m)	$0	A cooperative observer reported a tornado that caused no known damage.
EF0	SSE of Irwin	Cherry	NE	42.5845°N 101.7613°W	2240 – 2243	0.37 mi (0.60 km)	40 yd (37 m)	$0	The public reported a tornado that moved across open country; no known damage occurred.
EF0	NNE of Irwin	Cherry	NE	42.986°N 101.876°W	2240	0.2 mi (0.32 km)	40 yd (37 m)	$0	A trained storm spotter observed a brief tornado; no damage was reported.
EF0	S of Merriman	Cherry	NE	42.5122°N 101.7089°W	2328 – 2332	0.73 mi (1.17 km)	40 yd (37 m)	$60,000	A semi-trailer truck was overturned and a car was blown off the road.
EF0	N of Whitman	Cherry	NE	42.4255°N 101.5528°W	0000 – 0010	0.66 mi (1.06 km)	40 yd (37 m)	$10,000	Trees were uprooted and treetops were damaged.
EF1	SW of Hartington	Cedar	NE	42.5606°N 97.3137°W	0057 – 0105	3.94 mi (6.34 km)	630 yd (580 m)	$10,000	A tornado heavily damaged outbuildings on a farmstead. Tree damage occurred along the path as well.
EF3	NW of Coleridge to NE of Coleridge	Cedar	NE	42.5371°N 97.2563°W	0109 – 0156	8.24 mi (13.26 km)	2,059 yd (1,883 m)	$2,000,000	See section on this tornado.
EF0	WSW of Brownlee	Cherry	NE	42.12°N 101.15°W	0139	0.2 mi (0.32 km)	20 yd (18 m)	$0	An NWS employee observed a brief tornado in open rangeland; no known damage occurred.
EF1	Verona to Westmoreland	Oneida	NY	41.13°N 75.58°W	0203	11 mi (18 km)	250 yd (230 m)	Unknown	Numerous trees were snapped and uprooted in Verona, several homes sustained trim and shingle damage, tree branches were speared into a garage wall, fences and signs were downed, and a barn and sheds were destroyed in town. Minor tree damage occurred further east before the tornado lifted in Westmoreland.
EF0	WSW of Mullen	Hooker	NE	41.9607°N 101.2685°W	0207 – 0217	1.7 mi (2.7 km)	40 yd (37 m)	$0	A trained storm spotter observed a tornado that caused no known damage.
EF1	NNE of Laurel	Cedar	NE	42.5078°N 97.0519°W	0210 – 0225	3.39 mi (5.46 km)	850 yd (780 m)	$25,000	A house on a farmstead lost part of its roof and nearby outbuildings were heavily damaged. Tree and power pole damage occurred as well.
EF0	ENE of Coleridge	Cedar	NE	42.516°N 97.1589°W	0210 – 0218	1.29 mi (2.08 km)	100 yd (91 m)	$0	A short-lived tornado caused minor damage.
EF2	NNE of Laurel	Cedar	NE	42.516°N 97.1589°W	0228 – 0234	0.94 mi (1.51 km)	200 yd (180 m)	$50,000	A short-lived but strong tornado struck impacted two farmsteads; on one, a majority of the roof was removed from a house and several outbuildings were completely destroyed.
EF2	NNE of Laurel	Cedar	NE	42.4988°N 97.0407°W	0245 – 0325	8.04 mi (12.94 km)	750 yd (690 m)	$250,000	Outbuildings were completely destroyed at a farmstead, and extensive tree and power line damage occurred.
EF1	WNW of Dixon	Dixon	NE	42.426°N 97.0177°W	0345 – 0352	2.5 mi (4.0 km)	100 yd (91 m)	$20,000	A tornado damaged farm buildings, trees, power poles, and crops along its path.
EF2	S of Humboldt	Minnehaha	SD	43.5975°N 97.0583°W	0344 – 0402	3.37 mi (5.42 km)	400 yd (370 m)	$100,000	Trees and power poles were snapped, outbuildings were destroyed, and a house lost its roof and some exterior walls. A metal storage building was destroyed as well.
EF0	S of George	Lyon	IA	43.27°N 96.0°W	0427 – 0428	0.3 mi (0.48 km)	50 yd (46 m)	$0	A trained storm spotter observed a brief tornado over open country; no known damage occurred.

List of confirmed tornadoes – Tuesday, June 17, 2014
EF#	Location	County / Parish	State / Province	Start Coord.	Time (UTC)	Path length	Max width	Damage	Summary
EF3	Verona	Dane	WI	43.0024°N 89.5579°W	0508 – 0510	0.96 mi (1.54 km)	100 yd (91 m)	$14,000,000	Country View Elementary School and several homes sustained major structural damage, with other homes sustaining lesser damage. Reinforced, load-bearing masonry exterior walls were collapsed at the school. A large storage barn was swept away, with six antique cars stored inside thrown into an adjacent field and destroyed.
EF2	Southwestern Madison	Dane	WI	43.07°N 89.40°W	0515 – 0516	0.22 mi (0.35 km)	200 yd (180 m)	$5,000,000	Brief tornado touched down in a residential area of southwest Madison, downing numerous trees and power lines and damaging structures. Homes had their roofs torn off on Friar Lane.
EF1	SSW of Maple Bluff	Dane	WI	43.0772°N 89.3696°W	0521 – 0522	1.49 mi (2.40 km)	300 yd (270 m)	$150,000	Tornado began at B.B. Clarke Beach just to the east of downtown Madison and affected the Marquette neighborhood. Numerous trees were snapped and uprooted, some of which landed on homes and cars. Power lines were downed, and a house and a business lost their roofs. Other homes sustained shingle damage and several sailboats were sunk. A canoe and two kayaks were thrown as well.
EF1	ENE of Clarno to SE of Juda	Green	WI	42.5323°N 89.6119°W	0940 – 0948	6.78 mi (10.91 km)	640 yd (590 m)	$300,000	Sheds were destroyed and barns were severely damaged. Numerous large trees were snapped and uprooted.
EF1	Hale	Iosco	MI	44.3722°N 83.8247°W	1557 – 1558	1.58 mi (2.54 km)	100 yd (91 m)	$140,000	High-profile vehicles and numerous power and light poles were blown over in town, considerable tree damage was observed, and several homes and businesses sustained roof damage.
EF3	W of Capitol to Custer National Forest	Carter	MT	45.4783°N 104.1832°W	2027 – 2130	10 mi (16 km)	880 yd (800 m)	Unknown	A trailer home was obliterated, with its frame twisted and tossed over one mile (1.6 km) away. Nearby, an old A-frame schoolhouse was completely destroyed with only its basement left behind. Debris from this structure was thrown 100 yards (91 m). Six nearby cars were found up to 200 yards (180 m) away. Twenty power poles were snapped along the track, one of which was pulled out of the ground. Additionally, 20 hay bales weighing up to 1,500 lb (680 kg) were blown away and not recovered. The tornado continued into Custer National Forest before dissipating. This was the strongest tornado ever recorded in southeastern Montana.
EF0	NE of Hell Creek State Park	Carter	MT	47.715°N 106.7041°W	2154 – 2158	0.07 mi (0.11 km)	15 yd (14 m)	$0	A cooperative observer reported a tornado that caused no known damage.
EF0	SSE of Irwin	Cherry	NE	42.5845°N 101.7613°W	2240 – 2243	0.37 mi (0.60 km)	40 yd (37 m)	$0	The public reported a tornado that moved across open country; no known damage occurred.
EF0	NNE of Irwin	Cherry	NE	42.986°N 101.876°W	2240	0.2 mi (0.32 km)	40 yd (37 m)	$0	A trained storm spotter observed a brief tornado; no damage was reported.
EF0	S of Merriman	Cherry	NE	42.5122°N 101.7089°W	2328 – 2332	0.73 mi (1.17 km)	40 yd (37 m)	$60,000	A semi-trailer truck was overturned and a car was blown off the road.
EF0	N of Whitman	Cherry	NE	42.4255°N 101.5528°W	0000 – 0010	0.66 mi (1.06 km)	40 yd (37 m)	$10,000	Trees were uprooted and treetops were damaged.
EF1	SW of Hartington	Cedar	NE	42.5606°N 97.3137°W	0057 – 0105	3.94 mi (6.34 km)	630 yd (580 m)	$10,000	A tornado heavily damaged outbuildings on a farmstead. Tree damage occurred along the path as well.
EF3	Coleridge	Cedar	NE	42.5371°N 97.2563°W	0109 – 0156	8.24 mi (13.26 km)	2,059 yd (1,883 m)	$2,000,000	Power poles were snapped, farm fields were severely scoured, trees were debarked, and barns were swept away by this massive and slow-moving multiple-vortex wedge tornado. A grain bin was thrown 300 yards, a dehydration plant was completely leveled, and a truck and a trailer were tossed as well. The outer edge of the circulation impacted Coleridge, where a scoreboard was destroyed, a set of bleachers was thrown 100 yards (91 m), storage buildings were damaged, trees were downed, and homes sustained minor damage. Outside of town, farm fields were scoured, livestock was killed, additional trees were debarked, outbuildings were destroyed, and several farmhouses were damaged or destroyed, including two unanchored homes that were swept completely away.
EF0	WSW of Brownlee	Cherry	NE	42.12°N 101.15°W	0139	0.2 mi (0.32 km)	20 yd (18 m)	$0	An NWS employee observed a brief tornado in open rangeland; no known damage occurred.
EF1	Verona to Westmoreland	Oneida	NY	41.13°N 75.58°W	0203	11 mi (18 km)	250 yd (230 m)	Unknown	Numerous trees were snapped and uprooted in Verona, several homes sustained trim and shingle damage, tree branches were speared into a garage wall, fences and signs were downed, and a barn and sheds were destroyed in town. Minor tree damage occurred further east before the tornado lifted in Westmoreland.
EF0	WSW of Mullen	Hooker	NE	41.9607°N 101.2685°W	0207 – 0217	1.7 mi (2.7 km)	40 yd (37 m)	$0	A trained storm spotter observed a tornado that caused no known damage.
EF1	NNE of Laurel	Cedar	NE	42.5078°N 97.0519°W	0210 – 0225	3.39 mi (5.46 km)	850 yd (780 m)	$25,000	A house on a farmstead lost part of its roof and nearby outbuildings were heavily damaged. Tree and power pole damage occurred as well.
EF0	ENE of Coleridge	Cedar	NE	42.516°N 97.1589°W	0210 – 0218	1.29 mi (2.08 km)	100 yd (91 m)	$0	A short-lived tornado caused minor damage.
EF2	NNE of Laurel	Cedar	NE	42.516°N 97.1589°W	0228 – 0234	0.94 mi (1.51 km)	200 yd (180 m)	$50,000	A short-lived but strong tornado struck impacted two farmsteads; on one, a majority of the roof was removed from a house and several outbuildings were completely destroyed.
EF2	NNE of Laurel	Cedar	NE	42.4988°N 97.0407°W	0245 – 0325	8.04 mi (12.94 km)	750 yd (690 m)	$250,000	Outbuildings were completely destroyed at a farmstead, and extensive tree and power line damage occurred.
EF1	WNW of Dixon	Dixon	NE	42.426°N 97.0177°W	0345 – 0352	2.5 mi (4.0 km)	100 yd (91 m)	$20,000	A tornado damaged farm buildings, trees, power poles, and crops along its path.
EF2	S of Humboldt	Minnehaha	SD	43.5975°N 97.0583°W	0344 – 0402	3.37 mi (5.42 km)	400 yd (370 m)	$100,000	Trees and power poles were snapped, outbuildings were destroyed, and a house lost its roof and some exterior walls. A metal storage building was destroyed as well.
EF0	S of George	Lyon	IA	43.27°N 96.0°W	0427 – 0428	0.3 mi (0.48 km)	50 yd (46 m)	$0	A trained storm spotter observed a brief tornado over open country; no known damage occurred.

=== June 18 event ===
List of confirmed tornadoes – Wednesday, June 18, 2014
EF#	Location	County / Parish	State	Start Coord.	Time (UTC)	Path length	Max width	Damage	Summary
EF0	NW of Royal	Clay	IA	43.09°N 95.33°W	0615 – 0616	0.2 mi (0.32 km)	50 ft (17 yd)	$5,000	A brief tornado damaged a few outbuildings.
EF0	NE of Black Earth	Dane	WI	43.1564°N 89.7122°W	1227 – 1228	0.16 mi (0.26 km)	30 yd (27 m)	$0	The public observed a tornado damaging trees.
EF1	E of Stephan	Hyde	SD	44.2509°N 99.3672°W	2305 – 2315	0.73 mi (1.17 km)	40 yd (37 m)	Unknown	One house had part of its metal roof torn off while another completely lost its roof structure. A wooden barn collapsed, a machine shed was destroyed, and a semi-tractor trailer was blown on its side. Numerous trees in a grove were topped or had large branches broken off.
EF0	NE of Fort Thompson	Buffalo	SD	44.18°N 99.28°W	2307 – 2315	2 mi (3.2 km)	440 yd (400 m)	Unknown	Several softwood trees in a windbreak were uprooted or had large branches broken off.
EF0	E of Gann Valley	Buffalo	SD	44.023°N 98.939°W	2345 – 2350	0.65 mi (1.05 km)	250 yd (230 m)	$0	A trained storm spotter reported a tornado in open country; no known damage occurred.
EF1	NW of Crow Lake	Jerauld	SD	44.0487°N 98.8351°W	2358 – 0004	0.67 mi (1.08 km)	50 yd (46 m)	$15,000	A farm building sustained severe roof damage and tree damage occurred as well.
EF0	SW of Ree Heights	Hand	SD	44.433°N 99.268°W	0000 – 0005	0.21 mi (0.34 km)	75 yd (69 m)	Unknown	A tornado caused roof damage to an outbuilding and damaged several trees in a windbreak.
EF0	SW of Cresbard	Faulk	SD	45.122°N 98.995°W	0000 – 0005	1.17 mi (1.88 km)	75 yd (69 m)	Unknown	Aerial survey revealed a visible tornado path through a farm field.
EF1	Crow Lake	Jerauld	SD	43.948°N 98.7844°W	0001 – 0018	6.83 mi (10.99 km)	150 yd (140 m)	$50,000	A tornado collapsed the roof of a farm building, causing severe damage, and snapped several trees. Crop damage occurred as well.
EF0	SW of Ashley	McIntosh	ND	45.99°N 99.43°W	0008 – 0009	0.02 mi (0.032 km)	20 yd (18 m)	$0	Law enforcement reported a brief tornado in open country; no known damaged occurred.
EF2	NNW of Crow Lake	Jerauld	SD	44.0635°N 98.8025°W	0008 0017	0.77 mi (1.24 km)	100 yd (91 m)	$20,000	A farm building was destroyed, and trees were splintered or debarked.
EF2	Wessington Springs	Jerauld	SD	44.0725°N 98.573°W	0030 – 0052	2.22 mi (3.57 km)	200 yd (180 m)	$5,200,000	See section on this tornado – 1 person was injured.
EF4	SSE of Lane to W of Alpena to S of Virgil	Jerauld, Beadle	SD	44.0372°N 98.4032°W	0043 – 0125	11.5 mi (18.5 km)	880 yd (800 m)	$300,000	See section on this tornado – 2 people were injured.
EF2	NW of Crow Lake	Jerauld	SD	44.034°N 98.8908°W	0045 – 0054	1.09 mi (1.75 km)	100 yd (91 m)	$25,000	A farm building was destroyed and damage to crops and trees was observed.
EF0	SE of Limestone	Clarion	PA	41.1059°N 79.2986°W	0049 – 0056	4.57 mi (7.35 km)	150 yd (140 m)	$25,000	Numerous hardwood trees were snapped or uprooted, a barn was destroyed, and the roof of a second-story deck was removed.
EF0	NE of Akron	Washington	CO	40.38°N 102.95°W	0216	0.1 mi (0.16 km)	50 yd (46 m)	$0	A trained storm spotter observed a brief tornado; no damage was reported.
EF0	NNE of Akron	Washington	CO	40.3°N 103.07°W	0226	0.1 mi (0.16 km)	50 yd (46 m)	$0	A brief tornado remained over open country and caused no damage.
EF0	SE of Akron	Washington	CO	40.23°N 103.07°W	0236	0.1 mi (0.16 km)	50 yd (46 m)	$0	A trained storm spotter observed a brief tornado; no damage was reported.
EF0	NE of Marshall	Lyon	MN	44.48°N 95.75°W	0324 – 0325	0.25 mi (0.40 km)	50 yd (46 m)	$0	A brief tornado caused no known damage.

=== June 19 event ===
List of confirmed tornadoes – Friday, June 19, 2014
EF#	Location	County / Parish	State	Start Coord.	Time (UTC)	Path length	Max width	Damage	Summary	Refs
EF0	Spencer area	Clay	IA	43.15°N 95.15°W	1830–1831	0.15 mi (0.24 km)	50 yd (46 m)	$0	Broadcast media observed a brief tornado that caused no damage.	
EF0	NW of Howes	Meade	SD	44.6507°N 102.0932°W	1905–1908	0.1 mi (0.16 km)	10 yd (9.1 m)	$0	A trained storm spotter observed a very small tornado that caused no damage.	
EF0	SE of Plainview	Meade	SD	44.5591°N 102.1125°W	1945–1950	0.1 mi (0.16 km)	10 yd (9.1 m)	$0	A very small tornado was reported; no known damage occurred.	
EF0	ESE of Milesville	Haakon	SD	44.36°N 101.47°W	2003–2008	0.05 mi (0.080 km)	10 yd (9.1 m)	$0	A trained storm spotter reported a very small tornado that caused no damage.	
EF1	ENE of Spencers Grove to Colesburg	Delaware	IA	42.4483°N 91.3733°W	2004–2028	15.69 mi (25.25 km)	75 yd (69 m)	$50,000	A tornado remained over mainly forested areas, downing numerous trees. Power poles and farm outbuildings were damaged along its path.	
EF0	NE of Danvers	Swift	MN	45.3015°N 95.7448°W	2100–2103	0.87 mi (1.40 km)	10 yd (9.1 m)	$0	A brief tornado tracked through a corn field.	
EF0	NE of Benson	Swift	MN	45.2761°N 95.6648°W	2113–2126	4.43 mi (7.13 km)	20 yd (18 m)	$0	A tornado knocked down or broke numerous trees.	
EF0	SW of Kensington	Douglas	MN	45.7709°N 95.7135°W	2116–2122	4.43 mi (7.13 km)	20 yd (18 m)	$0	Several trained storm spotter observed a very narrow tornado; no damage was reported.	
EF0	E of Benson	Swift	MN	45.3242°N 95.5615°W	2132–2135	0.69 mi (1.11 km)	10 yd (9.1 m)	$5,000	A brief tornado tore the roof off of a shed and damaged a grove of trees.	
EF0	NE of Montevideo	Chippewa	MN	45.0164°N 95.5637°W	2136–2141	1.03 mi (1.66 km)	10 yd (9.1 m)	$0	Some grass fields were torn up.	
EF0	NW of Maynard	Chippewa	MN	44.9307°N 95.4879°W	2145–2146	0.15 mi (0.24 km)	10 yd (9.1 m)	$0	Law enforcement and multiple witnesses observed a brief tornado in an open field; no damage was reported.	

=== June 20 event ===
List of confirmed tornadoes – Friday, June 20, 2014
EF#	Location	County / Parish	State	Start Coord.	Time (UTC)	Path length	Max width	Damage	Summary	Refs
EF0	Otter Tail Lake	Otter Tail	MN	46.4134°N 95.6082°W	2210–2211	0.3 mi (0.48 km)	20 yd (18 m)	$0	The public observed a brief waterspout over Otter Tail Lake; no damage was reported.	

=== June 21 event ===
List of confirmed tornadoes – Saturday, June 21, 2014
EF#	Location	County / Parish	State	Start Coord.	Time (UTC)	Path length	Max width	Damage	Summary	Refs
EF0	Near Moriarty	Torrance	NM	35.0401°N 106.0703°W	1928–1938	0.1 mi (0.16 km)	30 yd (27 m)	$0	An NWS employee observed a landspout; no damage was reported.	
EF1	S of Hudson	Adams	CO	40.00°N 104.64°W	2036–2042	0.25 mi (0.40 km)	100 yd (91 m)	$0	Some outbuildings and a storage shed were damaged. Homes sustained minor roof damage.	
EF0	SE of Denver International Airport	Adams	CO	39.80°N 104.59°W	2042–2045	0.1 mi (0.16 km)	50 yd (46 m)	$0	A brief tornado touched down in an open field; no known damage occurred.	
EF0	N of Bennett	Adams	CO	39.80°N 104.42°W	2111	0.1 mi (0.16 km)	50 yd (46 m)	$0	A brief tornado that caused no damage.	
EF0	N of Syracuse	Hamilton	KS	38.07°N 101.75°W	2343–2345	0.49 mi (0.79 km)	25 yd (23 m)	$0	The public reported a brief tornado that caused no damage.	
EF0	NNE of Whitehorse	Dewey	SD	45.3°N 100.89°W	0045–0047	0.28 mi (0.45 km)	20 yd (18 m)	$0	Law enforcement observed a brief tornado in open country; no damage was reported.	
EF0	E of Greenview	Polk	MN	47.63°N 96.4411°W	0135–0142	2 mi (3.2 km)	300 yd (270 m)	$5,000	Numerous large trees and tree limbs were snapped across the Chicog Wildlife Management Area.	

=== June 22 event ===
List of confirmed tornadoes – Sunday, June 22, 2014
EF#	Location	County / Parish	State	Start Coord.	Time (UTC)	Path length	Max width	Damage	Summary	Refs
EF0	W of Slapout	Beaver	OK	36.62°N 100.28°W	2242–2250	2.01 mi (3.23 km)	100 yd (91 m)	$0	An old barn sustained minor damage, a manufactured home suffered minor roof damage, and a few outbuildings were damaged.	
EF1	W of Slapout	Beaver	OK	36.62°N 100.37°W	2303–2313	3.77 mi (6.07 km)	150 yd (140 m)	$0	Nearly two dozen power poles were snapped, a barn lost its roof and east wall, a center pivot irrigation system was damaged, and a barn and house suffered roof damage.	
EF0	SE of Elmwood	Beaver	OK	36.55°N 100.43°W	2331–2332	0.44 mi (0.71 km)	50 yd (46 m)	$0	The tops of trees were snapped and a metal garage was completely destroyed.	
EF0	WSW of Darrouzett	Lipscomb	TX	36.42°N 100.41°W	2357–0003	2 mi (3.2 km)	50 yd (46 m)	$0	A center pivot irrigation system was blown over.	
EF0	NW of Goodrich	Morgan	CO	40.4°N 104.12°W	0006	0.1 mi (0.16 km)	50 yd (46 m)	$0	A trained storm spotter observed a brief tornado in an open field; no known damage occurred.	
EF0	NNW of Lipscomb	Lipscomb	TX	36.31°N 100.31°W	0022–0023	1 mi (1.6 km)	75 yd (69 m)	$0	A brief tornado was documented by trained storm spotters; no known damage occurred.	
EF1	WNW of Canadian	Roberts, Hemphill	TX	35.96°N 100.53°W	0250–0255	1.86 mi (2.99 km)	100 yd (91 m)	$0	A ranch house sustained light damage. One barn sustained roof damage and two others, one wood and the other metal, were destroyed. Numerous trees were damaged.	

=== June 23 event ===
List of confirmed tornadoes – Monday, June 23, 2014
EF#	Location	County / Parish	State	Start Coord.	Time (UTC)	Path length	Max width	Damage	Summary	Refs
EF0	Beaufort	Beaufort	SC	32.4281°N 80.6726°W	1830–1835	0.01 mi (0.016 km)	50 yd (46 m)	$0	A waterspout remained stationary over a river.	
EF0	SW of Fairfield	Wayne	IL	38.3579°N 88.4382°W	2222–2228	2.89 mi (4.65 km)	200 yd (180 m)	$2,000	A well-documented tornado broke tree limbs.	
EF0	SW of Fairfield	Wayne	IL	38.3662°N 88.4126°W	2226–2229	1.8 mi (2.9 km)	150 yd (140 m)	$4,000	A tree was downed onto a house, causing some structural damage.	
EF1	Brunswick	Medina	OH	41.2301°N 81.8305°W	2255–2300	1.72 mi (2.77 km)	120 yd (110 m)	$750,000	At least 45 homes and businesses were impacted, including two houses that sustained major damage.	
EF0	NE of Haileyville	Pittsburg	OK	34.8701°N 95.5599°W	0059–0102	0.5 mi (0.80 km)	50 yd (46 m)	$0	A landspout was witnessed by several people; no known damage occurred.	

=== June 24 event ===
List of confirmed tornadoes – Tuesday, June 24, 2014
EF#	Location	County / Parish	State	Start Coord.	Time (UTC)	Path length	Max width	Damage	Summary	Refs
EF0	S of Quincy	Owen	IN	39.4104°N 86.7271°W	1715–1716	0.5 mi (0.80 km)	75 yd (69 m)	$12,000	Several buildings sustained minor damage, and trees were uprooted.	
EF1	W of Plano	Morgan	IN	39.4986°N 86.6312°W	1730–1731	0.25 mi (0.40 km)	75 yd (69 m)	$10,000	Numerous trees were uprooted, and a barn was destroyed.	
EF1	Six Points area	Hendricks, Marion	IN	39.7257°N 86.3496°W	1832–1842	2.84 mi (4.57 km)	75 yd (69 m)	$1,500,000	In Hendricks County, Indiana, a building was heavily damaged and over 200 cars were impacted by flying debris at a vehicle auction facility. A camping trailer was lofted and thrown approximately 175 ft (58 yd) to the east onto a house whose roof was largely removed. As the tornado entered Marion County, it removed portions of roofing from a couple of homes. In Indianapolis, officials estimated 75 to 100 homes sustained minor damage.	

=== June 25 event ===
List of confirmed tornadoes – Wednesday, June 25, 2014
EF#	Location	County / Parish	State	Start Coord.	Time (UTC)	Path length	Max width	Damage	Summary	Refs
EF0	N of Albany	Green	WI	42.74°N 89.44°W	2000	0.33 mi (0.53 km)	30 yd (27 m)	$0	Law enforcement observed a brief and weak tornado.	
EF0	N of Refugio	Refugio	TX	28.3177°N 97.2761°W	2114–2116	0.37 mi (0.60 km)	50 yd (46 m)	$50,000	A mobile home had its roof removed and north-facing wall collapsed. A couple of homes suffered minor shingle damage, and several large trees were toppled.	
EF1	E of Devils Tower	Crook	WY	44.572°N 104.62°W	0005–0025	5.92 mi (9.53 km)	100 yd (91 m)	$10,000	An old house and barn were destroyed, and large ponderosa pine trees were snapped and uprooted.	

=== June 26 event ===
List of confirmed tornadoes – Thursday, June 26, 2014
EF#	Location	County / Parish	State	Start Coord.	Time (UTC)	Path length	Max width	Damage	Summary	Refs
EF0	NW of Bayou Vista	Galveston	TX	29.3369°N 94.9646°W	1922–1924	0.04 mi (0.064 km)	75 yd (69 m)	$0	A storage trailer was overturned and destroyed, and a fence was knocked down. One person was injured.	
EF0	NNE of Savageton	Campbell	WY	44.053°N 105.689°W	2255	0.33 mi (0.53 km)	30 yd (27 m)	$10,000	A pole barn was destroyed, a small shed was damaged, and power poles were downed.	

=== June 27 event ===
List of confirmed tornadoes – Friday, June 27, 2014
EF#	Location	County / Parish	State	Start Coord.	Time (UTC)	Path length	Max width	Damage	Summary	Refs
EF0	WNW of Kenefick	Liberty	TX	30.1343°N 94.9272°W	1607–1612	0.01 mi (0.016 km)	20 yd (18 m)	$15,000	A brief tornado downed trees that inflicted minor damage to a home, its carport, and its garage.	
EF0	E of Cleveland	Liberty	TX	30.35°N 94.9994°W	1624–1627	0.03 mi (0.048 km)	25 yd (23 m)	$0	An emergency manager reported a brief tornado.	
EF0	W of Lake Arthur	Jefferson Davis	LA	30.0599°N 92.8295°W	1846–2000	4.62 mi (7.44 km)	300 yd (270 m)	$10,000	A small barn was damaged and another larger one was destroyed, a couple of power lines were bent and one was snapped, and several trees were felled.	
EF0	NNW of Punta Rassa	Lee	FL	26.5491°N 82.0206°W	1936–1939	1.24 mi (2.00 km)	20 yd (18 m)	$1,000	A few roof shingles were removed from a home.	
EF1	Colfax	Dunn	WI	44.9294°N 91.7668°W	2003–2018	7.02 mi (11.30 km)	100 yd (91 m)	$1,200,000	At a local high school, a shed was destroyed and two HVAC units were blown off the roof.	
EF0	NE of Haswel	Kiowa	CO	38.5737°N 103.0574°W	2018–2023	2.14 mi (3.44 km)	100 yd (91 m)	$0	A trained storm spotter observed a tornado over open country; no known damage occurred.	
EF0	SSE of Edson	Sherman	KS	39.3°N 101.54°W	2240–2242	1 mi (1.6 km)	25 yd (23 m)	Unknown	Law enforcement observed damage to a corn field.	
EF0	S of Brewster	Thomas	KS	39.29°N 101.38°W	2244–2248	2 mi (3.2 km)	25 yd (23 m)	$0	An NWS employee reported a tornado.	

=== June 28 event ===
List of confirmed tornadoes – Saturday, June 28, 2014
EF#	Location	County / Parish	State	Start Coord.	Time (UTC)	Path length	Max width	Damage	Summary	Refs
EF0	NW of Houston	Harris	TX	29.8018°N 95.4824°W	1925–1930	0.73 mi (1.17 km)	10 yd (9.1 m)	$45,000	A cinder block wall was felled, an apartment complex had several windows shattered and a commercial garage door blown in, and a residential carport was destroyed. A large tree was broken and several large tree limbs were snapped.	
EF0	Adair	Mayes	OK	36.4323°N 95.2831°W	2022–2028	4.3 mi (6.9 km)	400 yd (370 m)	$50,000	A fire department, homes, and businesses were damaged, large tree limbs were snapped, and power lines were downed.	

=== June 29 event ===
List of confirmed tornadoes – Sunday, June 29, 2014
EF#	Location	County / Parish	State	Start Coord.	Time (UTC)	Path length	Max width	Damage	Summary	Refs
EF1	SSW of Gove	Gove	KS	38.82°N 100.56°W	1105–1107	1 mi (1.6 km)	50 yd (46 m)	$50,000	A brief tornado heavily damaged two outbuildings and nearly destroyed a third.	
EF0	ENE of Stanhope	Hamilton	IA	42.302°N 93.7356°W	0028–0033	1.99 mi (3.20 km)	40 yd (37 m)	$2,000	Tornado observed by storm chasers	
EF0	WSW of Panama	Shelby	IA	41.7182°N 95.5114°W	0108–0109	0.5 mi (0.80 km)	50 yd (46 m)	$0	A brief tornado touched down over open fields.	
EF1	WSW of Morrison	Grundy	IA	42.3471°N 92.6911°W	0118–0122	1.9 mi (3.1 km)	50 yd (46 m)	$32,000	A brief tornado moved through northern Morrison.	
EF1	SW of Gifford	Hardin	IA	42.268°N 93.0937°W	0125–0128	1.27 mi (2.04 km)	75 yd (69 m)	$3,000	A tornado struck a cemetery and caused minor roof damage to a home.	
EF0	N of Armour	Buchanan	MO	39.5627°N 95.0526°W	0212–0213	0.25 mi (0.40 km)	25 yd (23 m)	$0	A brief tornado that caused no damage	
EF0	N of Topeka	Shawnee	KS	39.09°N 95.68°W	0220–0225	1.63 mi (2.62 km)	30 yd (27 m)	$0	A brief tornado that caused no damage	
EF1	SE of Princeton	Mercer	MO	40.3532°N 93.4855°W	0255–0312	6.31 mi (10.15 km)	300 yd (270 m)	$0	A single family home was damaged and several hog storage buildings were destroyed.	
EF1	NNE of Fennimore to NW of Montfort	Grant	WI	42.9988°N 90.6404°W	0300–0311	8.18 mi (13.16 km)	600 yd (550 m)	$416,000	Three homes and several outbuildings were damaged. Many trees were also damaged, some of which were snapped.	
EF2	NNW of Montfort to N of Blue Mound State Park	Iowa	WI	43.0123°N 90.4216°W	0318–0352	29.07 mi (46.78 km)	400 yd (370 m)	$3,500,000	A long-tracked tornado caused sporadic damage along its path. Hundreds of trees were snapped or uprooted and farm silos were downed. A total of 59 homes were damaged with 4 destroyed.	
EF2	E of Edmund	Iowa	WI	42.9705°N 90.2243°W	0326–0331	5.05 mi (8.13 km)	200 yd (180 m)	$400,000	A large camper trailer was destroyed and thrown 100 yards. A metal building was significantly damaged.	
EF0	NE of Wyoming	Jones	IA	42.09°N 90.96°W	0336	0.1 mi (0.16 km)	25 yd (23 m)	$0	A brief tornado that caused no damage.	
EF1	N of Oregon	Dane	WI	42.9541°N 89.3773°W	0427–0430	2.32 mi (3.73 km)	500 yd (460 m)	$50,000	Barn roofs were partially blown off and numerous trees were uprooted and snapped.	

=== June 30 event ===
List of confirmed tornadoes – Monday, June 30, 2014
EF#	Location	County / Parish	State	Start Coord.	Time (UTC)	Path length	Max width	Damage	Summary	Refs
EF1	Thomson area	Carroll	IL	41.9613°N 90.1153°W	0530–0533	2.24 mi (3.60 km)	600 yd (550 m)	$50,000	Trees were snapped or uprooted, inflicting damage to homes and vehicles, and an old outbuilding was destroyed.	
EF1	NE of Queen City	Schuyler	MO	40.4616°N 92.5177°W	0545–0557	4.74 mi (7.63 km)	300 yd (270 m)	$0	Several houses were damaged, and several outbuildings were destroyed.	
EF1	SE of Casey	Adair	IA	41.4638°N 94.4672°W	1742–1750	7.12 mi (11.46 km)	200 yd (180 m)	$225,000	A house and several outbuildings were heavily damaged or destroyed near the end of the path.	
EF1	ESE of Zearing to SE of Union	Story, Marshall, Hardin	IA	42.1635°N 93.2637°W	1802–1825	12.04 mi (19.38 km)	460 yd (420 m)	$250,000	The tornado began in Story County, Iowa, inflicting damage to multiple buildings on a farmstead. In Marshall County, it completely destroyed a farm outbuilding and grazed two additional farmsteads. In Hardin County, the tornado inflicted EF1 damage to wooden power poles. Numerous trees were damaged in all three counties.	
EF1	NE of Winterset	Madison	IA	41.4042°N 93.9532°W	1813–1814	1.34 mi (2.16 km)	75 yd (69 m)	$30,000	A brief tornado damaged a house and several trees.	
EF1	NNW of Patterson	Madison	IA	41.3993°N 93.9163°W	1815–1823	6.38 mi (10.27 km)	400 yd (370 m)	$105,000	Hundreds of trees were snapped or uprooted, a detached garage roof failed and damaged a portion of an associated house roof, and five homes sustained roof and siding damage.	
EF0	W of Bangor to SE of Union	Marshall, Hardin	IA	42.1714°N 93.1434°W	1815–1826	6.51 mi (10.48 km)	150 yd (140 m)	$59,000	The tornado began in Marshall County, Iowa, grazing three farmsteads, damaging trees, and impacting a few outbuildings. In Hardin County, additional trees were damaged.	
EF1	E of Martensdale	Warren	IA	41.3891°N 93.7385°W	1827–1829	2.03 mi (3.27 km)	190 yd (170 m)	$1,000	Dozens of trees were damaged.	
EF2	Traer	Tama	IA	42.2117°N 92.5253°W	1902–1910	3.7 mi (6.0 km)	150 yd (140 m)	$175,000	Several homes were impacted, including one that suffered low-end EF2 damage.	
EF1	W of Urbana	Benton	IA	42.2264°N 91.9131°W	1927–1928	0.43 mi (0.69 km)	75 yd (69 m)	$0	A house had its roof removed, nine additional homes sustained lesser damage, and two garages were destroyed.	
EF0	NW of Parnell	Nodaway	MO	40.4369°N 94.7211°W	2140–2145	3.52 mi (5.66 km)	200 yd (180 m)	$0	The tornado remained over open fields; no damage was reported.	
EF0	SW of Springfield	Baca	CO	37.3612°N 102.6564°W	2320–2323	0.27 mi (0.43 km)	50 yd (46 m)	$0	A brief landspout tornado occurred over open country; no damage was reported.	
EF1	SE of Denver	Gentry, Worth	MO	40.3844°N 94.3019°W	2343–2355	2.15 mi (3.46 km)	300 yd (270 m)	$0	A family home was damaged and a machine shed on the property was destroyed.	
EF0	N of Coffey	Harrison	MO	40.1551°N 93.9938°W	0053–0058	2.99 mi (4.81 km)	200 yd (180 m)	$0	A storm chaser observed a tornado over open country; no damage was reported.	
EF1	Southwestern Earlville	LaSalle	IL	41.5886°N 88.9526°W	0216–0217	1.51 mi (2.43 km)	50 yd (46 m)	$250,000	A short-lived tornado touched down, embedded in an area of damaging straight-line winds. Numerous trees were downed and a garage was blown out on the southwest side of Earlville.	
EF1	SE of Liberty	Clay	MO	39.2136°N 94.3742°W	0234–0236	0.8 mi (1.3 km)	200 yd (180 m)	$0	Significant tree damage was observed.	
EF1	W of Lisbon	Kendall	IL	41.4817°N 88.5843°W	0238–0239	1.15 mi (1.85 km)	50 yd (46 m)	$50,000	Concentrated damage was found at two farmsteads, including the destruction of an outbuilding and two large trees snapped at their bases. Debris from the outbuilding was carried several hundred yards.	
EF0	N of Morris	Grundy	IL	41.4411°N 88.4692°W	0244–0246	2.16 mi (3.48 km)	50 yd (46 m)	$0	A tornado damage path was identified in crop fields.	
EF1	NE of Plainfield to SW of Romeoville	Will	IL	41.6272°N 88.1846°W	0255–0258	3.06 mi (4.92 km)	75 yd (69 m)	$500,000	More than fifty trees, including many large ones, were uprooted. Numerous roads were blocked due to fallen trees. Several residences suffered minor damage, mainly limited to blown-out windows and peeled shingles and siding.	
EF1	E of Manteno to NW of Grant Park	Kankakee	IL	41.2556°N 87.7816°W	0325–0328	4.07 mi (6.55 km)	200 yd (180 m)	$500,000	Multiple large trees were snapped at the trunk or uprooted. Barns and outbuildings on three farmsteads suffered heavy damage. Two barns lost their roofs and only had some of their walls remaining, with roofing material carried 300 yd (270 m). A wood board was speared at least 1 ft (30 cm) into the ground. Another barn was completely destroyed. A well-built shed was blown away and destroyed, with the cement blocks that anchored it tossed up to 40 ft (12 m). A 4,000 lb (1,800 kg) trailer was lifted and moved 40 ft (1,200 cm).	
EF1	E of Manteno	Kankakee	IL	41.2491°N 87.7427°W	0325–0333	8.69 mi (13.99 km)	150 yd (140 m)	$50,000	Numerous trees were damaged, a power pole was snapped, three farmsteads were impacted, and a barn sustained roof damage.	
EF1	NW of Grant Park	Kankakee	IL	41.2639°N 87.7219°W	0326–0330	3.05 mi (4.91 km)	300 yd (270 m)	$100,000	This tornado occurred in conjunction with the 0325–0328 UTC tornado, causing similar damage.	
EF1	N of Momence	Kankakee	IL	41.2005°N 87.6639°W	0329–0331	2.15 mi (3.46 km)	225 yd (206 m)	$0	Widespread tree damage was observed, including numerous large trees that were snapped or uprooted.	
EF1	NE of Momence	Kankakee	IL	41.1867°N 87.6391°W	0331–0334	3.09 mi (4.97 km)	150 yd (140 m)	$5,000	Damage to trees and to the roof of a barn was noted.	
EF1	SE of Sollitt	Kankakee	IL	41.2624°N 87.554°W	0333–0335	1.66 mi (2.67 km)	100 yd (91 m)	$150,000	A farmstead was damaged, with several large trees snapped, the windows of a residence blown in, and a three-story barn completely destroyed. A large tree branch was impaled into the front of the residence.	
EF1	NE of Grant Park to WSW of Lowell, IN	Kankakee (IL), Lake (IN)	IL, IN	41.2651°N 87.5685°W	0332–0337	3.4 mi (5.5 km)	200 yd (180 m)	$250,000	The tornado began in Kankakee County, Illinois, where a church was damaged, with one tree limb smashing a stained-glass window and another impaling itself into the church. A door in the church was blown open and ripped off. Some damage occurred to its structural integrity. The most significant damage occurred on a farmstead where large trees were snapped. A large three-story barn was completely destroyed. The residence had blown-out windows and a branch impaled into its front wall. A house under construction suffered significant damage when it lost a section of its roof and a large wall section collapsed. In Lake County, Indiana, trees were snapped or uprooted.	
EF1	Illinoi	Lake	IN	41.1863°N 87.5263°W	0335–0341	6.24 mi (10.04 km)	300 yd (270 m)	$15,000	Several trees were uprooted and several limbs were snapped, three wooden power poles were found leaning, and a barn sustained significant damage.	
EF1	S of Lowell	Lake	IN	41.2609°N 87.4869°W	0338–0348	9.92 mi (15.96 km)	500 yd (460 m)	$100,000	The tornado impacted three farmsteads, causing tree damage on the first two and completely destroying a wooden barn on a third. A large barn sustained major roof damage, two power poles were snapped, and grain bins were substantially damaged.	
EF1	WNW of Belshaw	Lake	IN	41.2537°N 87.4601°W	0339–0341	2.57 mi (4.14 km)	250 yd (230 m)	$0	Numerous trees and tree limbs were snapped or uprooted.	
EF1	SW of Lowell	Lake	IN	41.2784°N 87.4677°W	0339–0341	2.01 mi (3.23 km)	150 yd (140 m)	$5,000	A large work shed lost a significant portion of its roof and two farmsteads were impacted, with mainly tree damage observed.	
EF1	ENE of Schneider	Lake	IN	41.1918°N 87.4071°W	0342–0346	3.85 mi (6.20 km)	300 yd (270 m)	$100,000	Numerous trees were twisted, snapped, or uprooted, one of which caused major structural damage to a house.	
EF1	DeMotte	Jasper	IN	41.1888°N 87.2757°W	0349–0355	6.26 mi (10.07 km)	200 yd (180 m)	$500,000	The tornado first touched down near DeMotte, snapping numerous trees, and moved through the center of town. A pole barn was completely destroyed and a manufactured home was damaged. Near the end of the path, trees were snapped and power poles were left leaning. Two farmsteads were damaged. The doors collapsed in one pole barn, while the roof was removed from another, causing the walls to collapse.	
EF1	ENE of DeMotte	Jasper	IN	41.223°N 87.128°W	0355–0356	0.94 mi (1.51 km)	100 yd (91 m)	$10,000	Many trees were snapped, and two farmsteads were damaged. A pole barn had its doors collapse and another had its walls collapse after the roof was blown off.	
EF1	Pinhook	LaPorte	IN	41.5625°N 86.858°W	0411–0412	0.26 mi (0.42 km)	200 yd (180 m)	$0	A brief tornado caused widespread tree damage and destroyed a two-story barn, throwing debris to the northeast.	
EF1	E of Kingsford Heights	LaPorte	IN	41.4787°N 86.6837°W	0424–0428	4.72 mi (7.60 km)	200 yd (180 m)	$0	Numerous trees were snapped or uprooted, causing damage to several homes.	
EF1	S of South Center to WNW of Koontz Lake	Starke	IN	41.4189°N 86.6409°W	0425–0428	4.93 mi (7.93 km)	400 yd (370 m)	$0	Extensive tree damage occurred, many homes were damaged, multiple irrigation pivots in corn fields were flipped, and a two-story barn was destroyed.	
EF1	Koontz Lake	Starke, Marshall	IN	41.4187°N 86.5304°W	0429–0433	4.85 mi (7.81 km)	400 yd (370 m)	$0	The tornado began in Starke County, Indiana, and ended in Marshall County. Numerous trees were snapped or uprooted.	
EF1	S of Donaldson to N of Plymouth	Marshall	IN	41.346°N 86.4435°W	0435–0442	6.85 mi (11.02 km)	150 yd (140 m)	$0	After touching down near Donaldson, hardwood trees and a farm were damaged. Further east, tree damage occurred before moving into Plymouth, where multiple trees were damaged or snapped and a semi-trailer was flipped. The Behavioral Science Building suffered minor structural damage, and part of the roof of the Department of Transportation garage was uplifted, causing a cinder block wall to collapse.	
EF1	NE of Plymouth	Marshall	IN	41.361°N 86.2893°W	0441–0442	0.16 mi (0.26 km)	50 yd (46 m)	$0	Trees were uprooted and severely damaged. A shed was flattened and a barn was shifted off its foundation.	

== July ==
Confirmed tornadoes by Enhanced Fujita rating
EFU	EF0	EF1	EF2	EF3	EF4	EF5	Total
0	51	34	4	1	0	0	90

=== July 1 event ===
List of confirmed tornadoes – Tuesday, July 1, 2014
EF#	Location	County / Parish	State	Start Coord.	Time (UTC)	Path length	Max width	Damage	Summary	Refs
EF1	S of Gravelton to ENE of Palestine	Kosciusko	IN	41.1979°N 85.9217°W	0506–0508	0.55 mi (0.89 km)	150 yd (140 m)	$0	Numerous trees were uprooted or snapped, with one falling onto a residence. A barn suffered extensive roof damage and partial wall failure.	
EF0	W of Milford	Kosciusko	IN	41.4124°N 85.9189°W	0506–0508	1.79 mi (2.88 km)	50 yd (46 m)	$0	A large metal farm building and a barn were destroyed.	
EF1	SE of Silver Lake	Wabash, Kosciusko	IN	41.0314°N 85.8965°W	0508–0515	7.01 mi (11.28 km)	150 yd (140 m)	$0	The tornado began in Wabash County, Indiana, producing extensive tree and crop damage, inflicting minor to moderate damage to structures on several farmsteads, and scouring the ground in a corn field. In Kosciusko County, a hog barn on a farm was destroyed with its debris thrown southeastward, a large grain bin was flattened, a harvester silo sustained severe damage, and additional extensive tree and crop damage was observed.	
EF1	SW of South Whitley	Whitley	IN	41.0516°N 85.6567°W	0522–0523	0.45 mi (0.72 km)	50 yd (46 m)	$0	A barn and chicken coop were destroyed, with debris lofted and scattered across a field and through a treeline. A horse barn lost most of its roof, and a house and garage suffered minor roof and siding damage. Extensive tree damage occurred, with many trees snapped and uprooted.	
EF1	LaGrange	LaGrange	IN	41.6414°N 85.4396°W	0538–0540	0.93 mi (1.50 km)	50 yd (46 m)	$0	Tree limb damage occurred near the beginning of the path. Numerous trees were uprooted and snapped. Homes in town suffered minor structural damage.	

=== July 2 event ===
List of confirmed tornadoes – Wednesday, July 2, 2014
EF#	Location	County / Parish	State	Start Coord.	Time (UTC)	Path length	Max width	Damage	Summary	Refs
EF0	NNE of Lake Stamford	Haskell	TX	33.1018°N 99.613°W	2200–2202	0.22 mi (0.35 km)	50 yd (46 m)	$0	The Haskell Volunteer Fire Department reported a brief landspout tornado; no damage was reported.	

=== July 3 event ===
- This event was related to Hurricane Arthur.

List of confirmed tornadoes – Thursday, July 3, 2014
EF#	Location	County / Parish	State	Start Coord.	Time (UTC)	Path length	Max width	Damage	Summary	Refs
EF1	SE of Rose Hill	Duplin	NC	34.805°N 78.009°W	2036–2038	0.77 mi (1.24 km)	200 yd (180 m)	$150,000	A tornado spawned by one of Hurricane Arthur's rainbands snapped or uprooted numerous trees and caused significant damage to two homes, with the roof blown off one.	
EF1	N of Hamilton	Martin	NC	35.9565°N 77.2038°W	0050–0053	1.13 mi (1.82 km)	100 yd (91 m)	$26,000	A tornado spawned by one of Hurricane Arthur's rainbands snapped or felled several trees. A fallen tree caused damage to a home and outbuilding.	
EF0	N of Ahoskie	Hertford	NC	36.34°N 76.98°W	0325–0326	0.9 mi (1.4 km)	30 yd (27 m)	$40,000	A house lost approximately 30 percent of its shingles, an associated carport was removed, and an outbuilding was destroyed. Significant crop damage occurred.	

=== July 4 event ===
List of confirmed tornadoes – Friday, July 4, 2014
EF#	Location	County / Parish	State	Start Coord.	Time (UTC)	Path length	Max width	Damage	Summary	Refs
EF0	Lynnwood	Virginia Beach	VA	36.88°N 76.08°W	0515–0516	0.31 mi (0.50 km)	30 yd (27 m)	$25,000	A tornado spawned by one of Hurricane Arthur's rainbands snapped or uprooted numerous trees. A tree fell on a house, damaging the roof.	
EF0	SE of Naval Station Norfolk	Norfolk	VA	36.92°N 76.27°W	0540–0541	0.25 mi (0.40 km)	30 yd (27 m)	$5,000	A tornado spawned by one of Hurricane Arthur's rainbands snapped or uprooted numerous trees.	
EF0	NE of Gilford	Belknap	NH	43.5868°N 71.3521°W	0000–0005	0.36 mi (0.58 km)	10 yd (9.1 m)	$0	A waterspout was observed over Lake Winnipesaukee; no damage was reported.	

=== July 6 event ===
List of confirmed tornadoes – Sunday, July 6, 2014
EF#	Location	County / Parish	State	Start Coord.	Time (UTC)	Path length	Max width	Damage	Summary	Refs
EF0	SSW of Mims	Brevard	FL	28.6506°N 80.8433°W	1842–1843	0.09 mi (0.14 km)	35 yd (32 m)	$50,000	Three homes sustained significant roof damage.	
EF0	NW of Jewell	Hamilton	IA	42.3244°N 93.6873°W	2303–2304	0.55 mi (0.89 km)	25 yd (23 m)	$1,000	A brief landspout tornado remained over agricultural fields.	
EF0	NW of Eleanor	Butler	IA	42.6341°N 92.8757°W	0000–0001	0.4 mi (0.64 km)	15 yd (14 m)	$1,000	A brief landspout tornado was photographed by members of the public.	
EF1	SW of Reinbeck	Grundy	IA	42.3327°N 92.6384°W	0058–0107	3.21 mi (5.17 km)	100 yd (91 m)	$250,000	Homes were damaged and crops were flattened.	
EF0	SW of Champion	Iron, Marquette	MI	46.3605°N 88.181°W	0102–0128	5.65 mi (9.09 km)	100 yd (91 m)	$4,000	The tornado began in Iron County, Michigan and ended in Marquette County, snapping or uprooting numerous trees along its path.	
EF0	SSE of Reinbeck	Grundy, Tama	IA	42.2975°N 92.5902°W	0108–0111	1.47 mi (2.37 km)	20 yd (18 m)	$1,000	The tornado began in Grundy County, Iowa and ended in Tama County, with damage confined to agricultural fields.	
EF1	WNW of Buckingham	Tama	IA	42.2878°N 92.5499°W	0112–0137	9.68 mi (15.58 km)	225 yd (206 m)	$225,000	A farmstead and numerous crops were damaged.	
EF0	W of New Town	McKenzie	ND	48.028°N 102.742°W	0125–0131	3.77 mi (6.07 km)	40 yd (37 m)	$0	A tornado was confirmed via a public report on social media.	
EF0	E of Stuart	Guthrie	IA	41.5155°N 94.2749°W	0141–0142	0.94 mi (1.51 km)	20 yd (18 m)	$1,000	The public observed a tornado touchdown in rural countryside.	
EF0	E of Baxter	Jasper	IA	41.8202°N 93.0568°W	0145–0203	4.63 mi (7.45 km)	80 yd (73 m)	$50,000	A trained storm spotter observed a tornado that remained over agricultural fields.	
EF0	SW of Garrison	Benton	IA	42.09°N 92.25°W	0156	0.1 mi (0.16 km)	10 yd (9.1 m)	$0	The Keystone Fire Department observed a brief tornado; no damage was reported.	
EF0	W of Kellogg	Jasper	IA	41.7245°N 92.9674°W	0215–0216	0.52 mi (0.84 km)	25 yd (23 m)	$1,000	The brief landspout tornado was well photographed.	
EF1	S of Grand Rapids	Kent	MI	42.85°N 85.7°W	0220–0230	6.25 mi (10.06 km)	400 yd (370 m)	$4,500,000	Numerous trees, structures, and power poles were downed.	
EF0	SW of Lyons	Ionia	MI	42.94°N 84.98°W	0416–0420	1 mi (1.6 km)	50 yd (46 m)	$300,000	Five farm buildings were damaged, a home lost a portion of its roofing material, and numerous trees were felled.	
EF0	S of Pewamo	Ionia	MI	42.9858°N 84.9056°W	0434–0438	0.75 mi (1.21 km)	150 yd (140 m)	$50,000	Structures were damaged and several trees were felled.	

=== July 7 event ===
List of confirmed tornadoes – Monday, July 7, 2014
EF#	Location	County / Parish	State	Start Coord.	Time (UTC)	Path length	Max width	Damage	Summary	Refs
EF0	NW of St. Johns	Clinton	MI	43.02°N 84.65°W	0500–0508	1.6 mi (2.6 km)	80 yd (73 m)	$50,000	Several trees were blown down and several outbuildings were damaged.	
EF0	Ethridge	Gallatin	KY	38.7711°N 84.9331°W	2340–2342	0.47 mi (0.76 km)	200 yd (180 m)	$150,000	A large dock sustained substantial damage, including the destruction of a section of roofing and the associated supporting structure. Several metal poles extending from a lake bottom to the dock were bent toward the southwest. Roof covering and several concrete cinder blocks securing a patio roof were lifted and tossed 50–100 ft (15–30 m) south of the original location. Several trees were blown down.	
EF0	N of Point Douglas	Washington, Pierce	MN, WI	44.8051°N 92.8079°W	2343–2349	2.59 mi (4.17 km)	50 yd (46 m)	$1,000	The tornado began in Washington County, Minnesota, causing damage to trees and a tennis court. Additional tree damage occurred in Pierce County, Wisconsin.	

=== July 8 event ===
List of confirmed tornadoes – Tuesday, July 8, 2014
EF#	Location	County / Parish	State	Start Coord.	Time (UTC)	Path length	Max width	Damage	Summary	Refs
EF1	N of Valley City	Lorain, Medina	OH	41.243°N 82.003°W	1733–1740	8.3 mi (13.4 km)	200 yd (180 m)	$78,000	The tornado started as an EF0 in Lorain County and moved into Medina County where it reached EF1 intensity. Much of the damage consisted of trees that were knocked down or uprooted. Some shingle and structural damage occurred, and a barn suffered moderate damage.	
EF1	Hinckley	Medina	OH	41.274°N 81.746°W	1743–1747	1.57 mi (2.53 km)	200 yd (180 m)	$20,000	A house received minor roof damage and trees were damaged at a golf course.	
EF1	Canfield	Mahoning	OH	41.023°N 80.829°W	1815–1818	5.39 mi (8.67 km)	200 yd (180 m)	$225,000	About 10 homes were damaged with trees down on several houses. A couple of garages were heavily damaged.	
EF1	SW of Mercer	Mercer	PA	41.1977°N 80.3272°W	1848–1851	2.46 mi (3.96 km)	150 yd (140 m)	$75,000	Numerous trees were snapped or uprooted, two barns and a home sustained roof damage, and a metal fence was blown down.	
EF1	Smithtown	Monongalia	WV	39.53°N 80.06°W	1925–1929	2.24 mi (3.60 km)	50 yd (46 m)	$25,000	Several trees were snapped or uprooted, one of which fell onto a garage and damaged a structure.	
EF1	N of Grafton	Taylor	WV	39.3729°N 80.0405°W	1955–2000	4.41 mi (7.10 km)	150 yd (140 m)	$50,000	Healthy trees were snapped or uprooted, one of which destroyed a manufactured home upon falling through the roof, and a carport was destroyed.	
EF2	NW of Dushore	Sullivan, Bradford	PA	41.55°N 76.48°W	2215–2224	6.68 mi (10.75 km)	500 yd (460 m)	$105,000	A strong tornado began in Sullivan County, Pennsylvania, ripping the roof from a house and a barn and tossing debris upwards of 100 yd (91 m). A trailer was thrown 30 yd (27 m) and demolished, and dozens of trees were downed. Upon entering Bradford County, the tornado downed additional trees, collapsed a barn, blew a trailer off its foundation and turned the structure 90 degrees, and peeled the roof off a barn, tossing the associated debris 200 yd (180 m).	
EF1	WSW of Rome	Oneida	NY	43.2°N 75.6°W	2233	1 mi (1.6 km)	600 yd (550 m)	$30,000	Numerous trees were uprooted, a home sustained light damage, and a pavilion was damaged.	
EF1	W of Lowville	Lewis	NY	43.778°N 75.5766°W	2248–2300	12.32 mi (19.83 km)	300 yd (270 m)	$250,000	Several homes were damaged by fallen trees, four barns were severely damaged, a garage was completely destroyed, two industrial buildings were damaged, and numerous trees were downed, twisted, or topped. In all, approximately 20 structures were impacted.	
EF0	Fairmount Township	Luzerne	PA	41.23°N 76.23°W	2300	0.9 mi (1.4 km)	50 yd (46 m)	$5,000	A storage shed, a garden, and numerous trees were destroyed, a roof was ripped from a barn, and a grain silo was shifted off its foundation.	
EF2	Smithfield	Madison	NY	42.99°N 75.64°W	2302–2305	2.5 mi (4.0 km)	235 yd (215 m)	$600,000	4 deaths – Three homes in Smithfield were destroyed and five others sustained significant damage. The tornado first struck a manufactured home and some additional construction where two people were killed. Nearby, another home, a barn, and a trailer were destroyed, with a third death occurring in the trailer. Yet another home was damaged by flying debris. The tornado then knocked a three-story house off of its foundation and rolled it down a hill, killing the occupant. Another home was struck by debris from this home. A home near the end of the path suffered EF1 damage. Many trees were downed.	
EF1	SE of Kingsley	Susquehanna	PA	41.75°N 75.74°W	2305	1.4 mi (2.3 km)	150 yd (140 m)	$100,000	Many large trees and power lines were downed; several homes were damaged by fallen trees. A chimney on a house was partially damaged.	
EF1	Deerfield	Oneida	NY	43.12°N 75.21°W	2325	1.3 mi (2.1 km)	65 yd (59 m)	$110,000	Dozens of trees were snapped and uprooted, a garage sustained structural damage, and several other residences experienced siding and shingle damage.	
EF0	S of North Creek	Warren	NY	43.6905°N 73.9874°W	0040–0041	1.09 mi (1.75 km)	100 yd (91 m)	Unknown	Damage was largely confined to hardwood and softwood trees, some of which fell on and damaged structures.	

=== July 10 event ===
List of confirmed tornadoes – Thursday, July 10, 2014
EF#	Location	County / Parish	State	Start Coord.	Time (UTC)	Path length	Max width	Damage	Summary	Refs
EF0	Virginia Beach	City of Virginia Beach	VA	36.8432°N 75.9763°W	1935–1936	0.34 mi (0.55 km)	30 yd (27 m)	$300,000	The roof was blown off a home and several other structures, including a school gymnasium, were damaged. A large pool window was blown out.	

=== July 12 event ===
List of confirmed tornadoes – Saturday, July 12, 2014
EF#	Location	County / Parish	State	Start Coord.	Time (UTC)	Path length	Max width	Damage	Summary	Refs
EF0	NE of Taylor Creek	Okeechobee	FL	27.2367°N 80.757°W	1720–1721	0.08 mi (0.13 km)	15 yd (14 m)	$2,000	Several trees were toppled and a lightweight shed was destroyed.	
EF0	ESE of Fountain	El Paso	CO	38.5867°N 104.476°W	2045–2051	0.53 mi (0.85 km)	50 yd (46 m)	$0	A trained storm spotter observed a brief tornado touchdown; no damage was reported.	
EF0	NNW of Mercer County Airport	Mercer	IL	41.2584°N 90.7362°W	0220–0221	0.38 mi (0.61 km)	50 yd (46 m)	$0	A tornado produced damage primarily to corn crops.	
EF1	WNW of Matherville	Mercer	IL	41.2674°N 90.6666°W	0230–0240	3.7 mi (6.0 km)	100 yd (91 m)	$10,000	A tornado damaged crops, power poles and lines, and trees.	
EF1	WNW of Griffin	Mercer	IL	41.2387°N 90.5289°W	0246–0255	2.78 mi (4.47 km)	50 yd (46 m)	$0	An outbuilding was destroyed and crops and trees were damaged.	
EF1	NW of Alpha	Henry	IL	41.2141°N 90.4256°W	0300–0301	0.66 mi (1.06 km)	50 yd (46 m)	$0	Several large trees were felled, several tree limbs were snapped, and some crops were damaged.	

=== July 13 event ===
List of confirmed tornadoes – Sunday, July 13, 2014
EF#	Location	County / Parish	State	Start Coord.	Time (UTC)	Path length	Max width	Damage	Summary	Refs
EF0	E of Cheyenne	Laramie	WY	41.14°N 104.6278°W	1940–1941	0.17 mi (0.27 km)	25 yd (23 m)	$0	A trained storm spotter reported a brief tornado in open country; no damage was reported.	
EF1	Reading	Schuyler	NY	42.43°N 76.93°W	2034–2037	3.5 mi (5.6 km)	125 yd (114 m)	$50,000	A canoe was blown 150 yd (140 m) from its original location in a pond and wrapped around a pole. Many trees were snapped or uprooted, with large splinters impaled into the ground, a house had a portion of its roof removed, and another home was severely damaged.	
EF0	S of Kimball	Kimball	NE	41.1142°N 103.66°W	2109–2110	0.14 mi (0.23 km)	25 yd (23 m)	$0	Law enforcement observed a brief tornado.	
EF0	WNW of Glengary	Berkeley	WV	39.3996°N 78.1886°W	2337–2338	0.07 mi (0.11 km)	50 yd (46 m)	$5,000	Several dozen trees were snapped or topped and another was uprooted.	
EF1	Parksville	Sullivan	NY	41.85°N 74.77°W	0030	0.75 mi (1.21 km)	270 yd (250 m)	$10,000	Two residences sustained damage to their roofing, siding, and chimneys, numerous rail fencing and yard ornaments were displaced, and catastrophic tree damage was observed.	

=== July 14 event ===
List of confirmed tornadoes – Monday, July 14, 2014
EF#	Location	County / Parish	State	Start Coord.	Time (UTC)	Path length	Max width	Damage	Summary	Refs
EF0	NE of Lamar	Prowers	CO	38.2166°N 102.4973°W	1740–1744	0.37 mi (0.60 km)	75 yd (69 m)	$0	A brief landspout tornado occurred over open country; no damage was reported.	

=== July 15 event ===
List of confirmed tornadoes – Tuesday, July 15, 2014
EF#	Location	County / Parish	State	Start Coord.	Time (UTC)	Path length	Max width	Damage	Summary	Refs
EF1	St. Albans	Somerset	ME	44.9107°N 69.4075°W	2252–2258	2.75 mi (4.43 km)	800 yd (730 m)	$0	Numerous trees were snapped or uprooted.	

=== July 16 event ===
List of confirmed tornadoes – Wednesday, July 16, 2014
EF#	Location	County / Parish	State	Start Coord.	Time (UTC)	Path length	Max width	Damage	Summary	Refs
EF0	NE of Stratford	Sherman	TX	36.3478°N 102.0543°W	0008–0009	0.01 mi (0.016 km)	50 yd (46 m)	$0	A storm spotter captured a brief tornado on video; no damage was reported.	
EF0	S of Stratford	Sherman	TX	36.3128°N 102.0527°W	0026–0033	1.34 mi (2.16 km)	100 yd (91 m)	$0	Utility lines were downed and an outbuilding was damaged.	
EF0	SW of Cactus	Moore	TX	36.0292°N 102.0838°W	0123–0130	3.07 mi (4.94 km)	100 yd (91 m)	$0	The tornado remained in open fields and caused no damage.	

=== July 21 event ===
List of confirmed tornadoes – Monday, July 21, 2014
EF#	Location	County / Parish	State	Start Coord.	Time (UTC)	Path length	Max width	Damage	Summary	Refs
EF0	Texas City	Galveston	TX	29.3788°N 94.9056°W	1835–1845	0.1 mi (0.16 km)	20 yd (18 m)	$15,000	A tornado briefly touched down at an oil refinery, damaging a building and shattering a vehicle's window.	
EF0	N of McHenry to SW of Pekin	Eddy, Griggs	ND	47.62°N 98.59°W	0035–0046	9.08 mi (14.61 km)	100 yd (91 m)	Unknown	The tornado began in Eddy County, North Dakota and ended in Griggs County, snapping tree branches and trunks in both.	
EF0	SW of Tolna	Nelson	ND	47.78°N 98.52°W	0047	0.01 mi (0.016 km)	20 yd (18 m)	Unknown	A trained storm spotter observed a brief tornado touchdown near the Sheyenne River.	
EF1	E of Kempton	Grand Forks	ND	47.82°N 97.57°W	0129–0141	8 mi (13 km)	300 yd (270 m)	Unknown	A few residences and farm buildings had shingles torn off, outbuildings damaged, and doors ripped off. Numerous trees and tree limbs were snapped or downed.	
EF2	NNW of Climax to ENE of Terrebonne	Polk, Red Lake	MN	47.7°N 96.86°W	0152–0235	37.92 mi (61.03 km)	800 yd (730 m)	Unknown	A strong, long-lived tornado began in Polk County, Minnesota and ended in Red Lake County. Numerous trees were snapped or uprooted, sections of roofing were removed from several residences and buildings, empty rail cars were tumbled, and power poles were snapped.	

=== July 23 event ===
List of confirmed tornadoes – Wednesday, July 23, 2014
EF#	Location	County / Parish	State	Start Coord.	Time (UTC)	Path length	Max width	Damage	Summary	Refs
EF0	Ross Barnett Reservoir	Rankin	MS	32.429°N 90.0285°W	2326–2340	0.7 mi (1.1 km)	25 yd (23 m)	$0	A waterspout was well-documented on social media.	

=== July 24 event ===
List of confirmed tornadoes – Thursday, July 24, 2014
EF#	Location	County / Parish	State	Start Coord.	Time (UTC)	Path length	Max width	Damage	Summary	Refs
EF1	Cherrystone	Northampton	VA	37.2893°N 76.071°W	1225–1240	7.69 mi (12.38 km)	150 yd (140 m)	$200,000	The tornado (which began as a waterspout) moved off Chesapeake Bay and through a campground. Many trees were downed or snapped off. Numerous camping trailers were damaged and several were destroyed. Several trees were brought down on cabins.	
EF0	E of Center Harbor	Belknap	NH	43.687°N 71.3051°W	1230–1235	0.02 mi (0.032 km)	10 yd (9.1 m)	$0	The public observed a waterspout on Lake Winnipesaukee; no damage was reported.	
EF0	SSE of Christmas	Orange	FL	28.4592°N 80.992°W	2159–2200	0.25 mi (0.40 km)	15 yd (14 m)	$0	Several motorists observed a brief tornado; no known damage occurred.	
EF0	W of Wibaux	Wibaux	MT	46.99°N 104.27°W	0119	1 mi (1.6 km)	100 yd (91 m)	$0	A trained storm spotter reported a brief tornado; no known damage occurred.	

=== July 25 event ===
List of confirmed tornadoes – Friday, July 25, 2014
EF#	Location	County / Parish	State	Start Coord.	Time (UTC)	Path length	Max width	Damage	Summary	Refs
EF1	WNW of Edgewater	Volusia	FL	28.9807°N 80.9281°W	2024–2029	1.69 mi (2.72 km)	75 yd (69 m)	$723,000	The tornado moved across an airpark where it flipped three small aircraft and caused major damage to three hangars. Farther along the path, numerous trees were uprooted and several homes sustained minor roof damage. Sporadic tree damage and minor structural damage continued until the tornado dissipated.	

=== July 27 event ===
List of confirmed tornadoes – Sunday, July 27, 2014
EF#	Location	County / Parish	State	Start Coord.	Time (UTC)	Path length	Max width	Damage	Summary	Refs
EF0	Wolcott	New Haven	CT	41.6055°N 72.9833°W	1650–1656	0.72 mi (1.16 km)	100 yd (91 m)	$25,000	Intermittent tree damage occurred along the path, with several trees topped and downed. One large tree fell on a trailer and another fell on a home. Large fixed sports equipment was thrown across a field, and a fence line was knocked down.	
EF0	NNE of Mutual	Champaign	OH	40.1236°N 83.6134°W	1929–1930	0.07 mi (0.11 km)	50 yd (46 m)	$15,000	A double-wide mobile home lost half of its roof, with its shingles and rafters lifted and tossed to the south. A large apple tree was uprooted and numerous smaller limbs from a willow tree were snapped and strewn to the east.	
EF1	ENE of Helton	Leslie	KY	36.9573°N 83.3506°W	2024–2026	2 mi (3.2 km)	900 yd (820 m)	Unknown	Numerous hardwood and softwood trees were uprooted along a tornado's path.	
EF1	Dalton	Berkshire	MA	42.453°N 73.1858°W	2055–2056	0.25 mi (0.40 km)	20 yd (18 m)	Unknown	A brief tornado downed a path of trees through a forest.	
EF0	Sebago Lake	Cumberland	ME	43.8971°N 70.587°W	2105–2110	0.63 mi (1.01 km)	10 yd (9.1 m)	$0	Several members of the public photographed a waterspout on Sebago Lake; no damage was reported.	
EF1	WSW of Colonial Heights	Sullivan	TN	36.462°N 82.56°W	2145–2146	0.5 mi (0.80 km)	50 yd (46 m)	Unknown	A house was heavily damaged and a few others sustained some degree of damage. Numerous trees were snapped or uprooted.	
EF0	SW of Colonial Heights	Washington	TN	36.4477°N 82.5498°W	2147–2202	7.1 mi (11.4 km)	300 yd (270 m)	Unknown	A large barn was heavily damaged and several houses sustained structural damage. Numerous trees were downed.	
EF3	Speedwell	Campbell, Claiborne	TN	36.4695°N 83.9766°W	2158–2202	4.66 mi (7.50 km)	800 yd (730 m)	Unknown	A significant tornado began in Campbell County, Tennessee, entering Claiborne County prior to dissipating. Structural damage ranged from minor to extensive, and numerous trees were snapped or uprooted.	
EF1	NW of Ellenboro	Pleasants, Ritchie	WV	39.3366°N 81.1412°W	2314–2321	4.1 mi (6.6 km)	200 yd (180 m)	$20,000	A tornado began in Pleasants County, West Virginia, snapping or uprooting many healthy hardwood trees and destroying a small metal outbuilding. In Ritchie County, additional trees were snapped and a single family home sustained damage to its roofing and windows.	
EF0	Lake Winnebago	Winnebago	WI	43.948°N 88.495°W	0005	0.01 mi (0.016 km)	10 yd (9.1 m)	$0	Members of the public photographed a waterspout over Lake Winnebago; no known damage occurred.	
EF0	SSW of Hillsboro	Highland	OH	39.186°N 83.6645°W	0039–0043	2.52 mi (4.06 km)	1,300 yd (1,200 m)	$80,000	Homes and barns sustained minor roof and fascia damage. A 100 ft (30 m) TV tower was downed, a small shed was destroyed, and another small shed was removed from its foundation. A mobile home had some of its walls pushed in, a grill was thrown 0.75 mi (1.21 km), and an old wooden pole barn was destroyed. A church sustained minor damage and a sign on the property was blown through the window of a nearby school bus, which was shifted several feet. Several nearby picnic tables were tossed into a wooden pavilion and a van. Towards the end of the path, an unanchored shed was blown 200 ft (61 m) and a boat parked nearby was shifted slightly. Extensive tree damage occurred along the path.	
EF1	SE of Lost Creek	Harrison	WV	39.1202°N 80.2948°W	0050–0052	1.07 mi (1.72 km)	50 yd (46 m)	$75,000	Numerous healthy trees were snapped or uprooted, and numerous power lines were downed. The roof to a church was lifted and then fell back into place, causing damage to the steeple and a back wall. A few tombstones in a cemetery were either blown over or damaged by flying debris.	

=== July 28 event ===
List of confirmed tornadoes – Monday, July 28, 2014
EF#	Location	County / Parish	State	Start Coord.	Time (UTC)	Path length	Max width	Damage	Summary	Refs
EF2	Chelsea to Revere	Suffolk	MA	42.398°N 71.0219°W	1332–1336	1.93 mi (3.11 km)	660 yd (600 m)	$4,000,000	A skating rink lost portions of its roof. Numerous houses were severely impacted, with more than 100 suffering damage ranging from peeled siding to portions of roofs lifted or missing. A house and a supermarket completely lost their roofs. Large oak trees were snapped midway up the trunk. Downed trees showed evidence of rotation and a convergent pattern. The town hall suffered roof damage and blown-out windows. Store signs were destroyed. Trees fell on several cars, some of which were crushed. A billboard was brought down on several other cars. One car was overturned. This was the first tornado ever recorded in Suffolk County.	
EF1	Limington	York	ME	43.66°N 70.68°W	1949–1955	1.71 mi (2.75 km)	80 yd (73 m)	$0	Numerous large trees were snapped or uprooted.	
EF0	S of Fort Lupton	Weld	CO	40.06°N 104.8°W	2153	0.1 mi (0.16 km)	50 yd (46 m)	$0	A brief tornado touched down over open fields; no known damage occurred.	
EF0	E of Adams City	Adams	CO	39.83°N 104.79°W	2209	0.1 mi (0.16 km)	50 yd (46 m)	$0	A brief tornado touched down in the Rocky Mountain Arsenal National Wildlife Refuge; no damage was reported.	

=== July 31 event ===
List of confirmed tornadoes – Thursday, July 31, 2014
EF#	Location	County / Parish	State	Start Coord.	Time (UTC)	Path length	Max width	Damage	Summary	Refs
EF0	NW of Carlin	Eureka	NV	40.9837°N 116.3827°W	2010–2020	0.48 mi (0.77 km)	7 yd (6.4 m)	$0	The tornado tracked just north of the Barrick Goldstrike Mine, throwing brush debris into the air.	
EF0	NW of Dodson	Blaine	MT	48.48°N 108.37°W	2310–2312	0.1 mi (0.16 km)	5 yd (4.6 m)	$0	The public reported a brief tornado.	

== See also ==
- Tornadoes of 2014
- June 16–18, 2014 tornado outbreak
- List of United States tornadoes from April to May 2014
- List of United States tornadoes from August to September 2014
