= Kathleen Littler =

American politician

Kathleen Painter Littler was a state legislator in Colorado. She served in the Colorado House of Representatives from 1961 to 1964. She was a Republican. She represented Weld County and lived in Greeley. She was the first woman in the state legislature from Weld County. The Littler Prevention Campus was named for her.

She was born and raised in Roggen, Colorado where her family owned a ranch. Her brother Stafford Painter also served in the legislature. She was assistant state director of adult education and held roles in health-related fields.
