= Agenda, Kansas =

City in Republic County, Kansas, US

- City
- Location within Republic County and Kansas

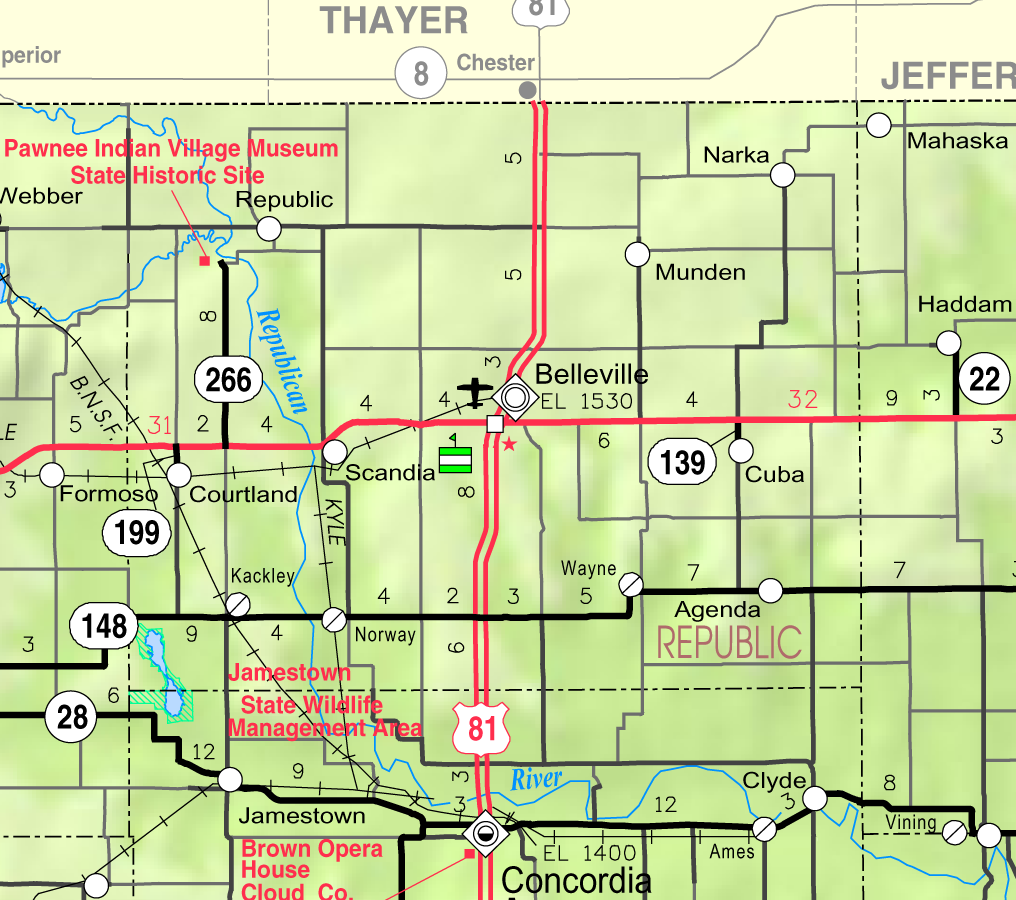
- KDOT map of Republic County (legend)
- Coordinates: 39°42′24″N 97°25′56″W
- Country: United States
- State: Kansas
- County: Republic
- Founded: 1880s
- Platted: 1887
- Incorporated: 1916

Area
  - Total: 0.17 sq mi (0.45 km^{2})
  - Land: 0.17 sq mi (0.45 km^{2})
  - Water: 0 sq mi (0.00 km^{2})
- Elevation: 1,414 ft (431 m)

Population (2020)
  - Total: 47
  - Density: 270/sq mi (100/km^{2})
- Time zone: UTC-6 (CST)
  - Summer (DST): UTC-5 (CDT)
- ZIP Code: 66930
- Area code: 785
- FIPS code: 20-00475
- GNIS ID: 2393890

Agenda is a city in Republic County, Kansas, United States. As of the 2020 census, the population of the city was 47.

== History ==
Agenda (formerly Neva) was laid out in 1887 on the Chicago, Rock Island and Pacific Railroad line. The name Agenda derives from Latin meaning "what ought to be done".

The first house in Agenda was erected by Joseph Cox in 1887. In the early 1900s, it had a money order post office with one rural delivery route, express and telegraph offices, several general stores and other business establishments, a bank, a grain elevator, and in 1910 reported a population of 200.

The post office in Agenda was discontinued in 1998.

== Geography ==
According to the United States Census Bureau, the city has a total area of 0.15 square miles (0.39 km^{2}), all land.

== Demographics ==
Historical population
Census	Pop.	Note	%±
1920	239		—
1930	185		−22.6%
1940	179		−3.2%
1950	159		−11.2%
1960	124		−22.0%
1970	107		−13.7%
1980	106		−0.9%
1990	81		−23.6%
2000	81		0.0%
2010	68		−16.0%
2020	47		−30.9%
U.S. Decennial Census

=== 2020 census ===
The 2020 United States census counted 47 people, 27 households, and 15 families in Agenda. The population density was 271.7 per square mile (104.9/km^{2}). There were 51 housing units at an average density of 294.8 per square mile (113.8/km^{2}). The racial makeup was 85.11% (40) white or European American (85.11% non-Hispanic white), 0.0% (0) black or African-American, 4.26% (2) Native American or Alaska Native, 0.0% (0) Asian, 0.0% (0) Pacific Islander or Native Hawaiian, 2.13% (1) from other races, and 8.51% (4) from two or more races. Hispanic or Latino of any race was 2.13% (1) of the population.

Of the 27 households, 14.8% had children under the age of 18; 44.4% were married couples living together; 18.5% had a female householder with no spouse or partner present. 40.7% of households consisted of individuals and 29.6% had someone living alone who was 65 years of age or older. The average household size was 2.2 and the average family size was 2.8. The percent of those with a bachelor's degree or higher was estimated to be 10.6% of the population.

8.5% of the population was under the age of 18, 4.3% from 18 to 24, 29.8% from 25 to 44, 25.5% from 45 to 64, and 31.9% who were 65 years of age or older. The median age was 61.3 years. For every 100 females, there were 88.0 males. For every 100 females ages 18 and older, there were 87.0 males.

The 2016–2020 5-year American Community Survey estimates show that the median household income was $41,250 (with a margin of error of +/- $25,607) and the median family income was $38,750 (+/- $7,750). Males had a median income of $40,481 (+/- $19,403). The median income for those above 16 years old was $38,750 (+/- $36,198). Approximately, 26.3% of families and 15.2% of the population were below the poverty line, including 0.0% of those under the age of 18 and 0.0% of those ages 65 or over.

=== 2010 census ===
As of the census of 2010, there were 68 people, 29 households, and 18 families living in the city. The population density was 453.3 inhabitants per square mile (175.0/km^{2}). There were 52 housing units at an average density of 346.7 per square mile (133.9/km^{2}). The racial makeup of the city was 97.1% White and 2.9% from two or more races.

There were 29 households, of which 24.1% had children under the age of 18 living with them, 58.6% were married couples living together, 3.4% had a female householder with no husband present, and 37.9% were non-families. 37.9% of all households were made up of individuals, and 17.2% had someone living alone who was 65 years of age or older. The average household size was 2.34 and the average family size was 3.11.

The median age in the city was 42 years. 25% of residents were under the age of 18; 4.5% were between the ages of 18 and 24; 22% were from 25 to 44; 23.5% were from 45 to 64; and 25% were 65 years of age or older. The gender makeup of the city was 51.5% male and 48.5% female.

== Education ==
The community is served by Republic County USD 109 public school district. It was formed in 2006 by the consolidation of Belleville USD 427 and Hillcrest USD 455. The Republic County High School mascot is Republic County Buffaloes.

Agenda schools were closed through school unification. The Agenda High School mascot was Huskies.
