= Lynnwood, Virginia Beach, Virginia =

Lynnwood
- Neighborhood
- Location within the Commonwealth of Virginia Lynnwood (the United States)
- Coordinates: 36°52′25″N 76°5′31″W
- Country: United States
- State: Virginia
- Independent city: Virginia Beach
- Time zone: UTC−5 (Eastern (EST))
  - Summer (DST): UTC−4 (EDT)

Lynnwood is a development in the Little Neck neighborhood of the independent city of Virginia Beach, Virginia in the United States of America.
