= Whitman, Nebraska =

- Unincorporated community
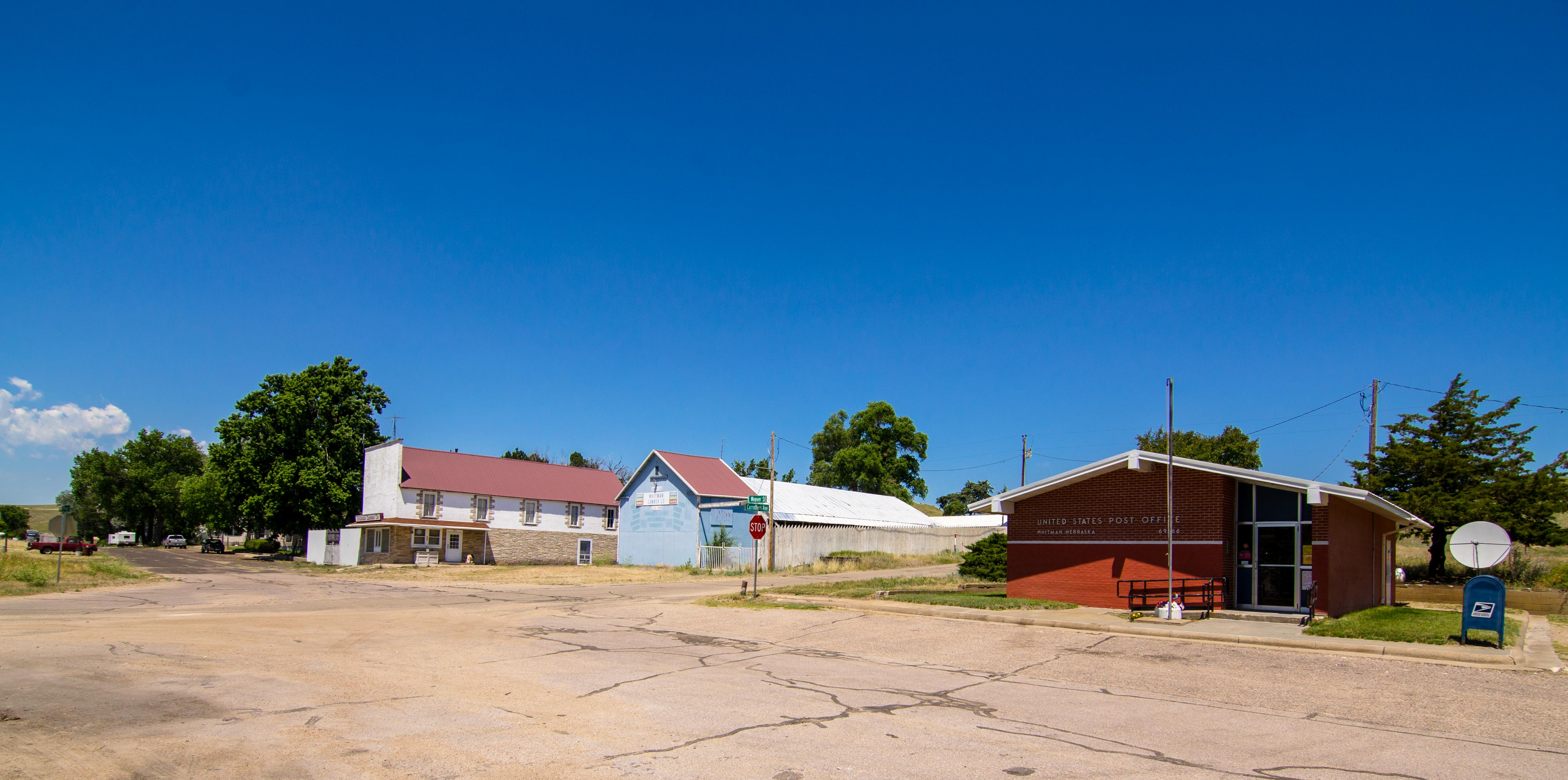
- Downtown Whitman

- Location within the state of Nebraska
- Coordinates: 42°2′31″N 101°31′24″W
- Country: United States
- State: Nebraska
- County: Grant
- Elevation: 3,602 ft (1,098 m)
- Time zone: UTC-7 (Mountain (MST))
  - Summer (DST): UTC-6 (MDT)
- ZIP code: 69366
- FIPS code: 31-52890
- GNIS feature ID: 834693

Whitman is an unincorporated community in northeastern Grant County, Nebraska, United States. It lies along Nebraska Highway 2, east of the village of Hyannis, the county seat of Grant County. The University of Nebraska–Lincoln Gudmundsen Sandhills Laboratory lies just north of the community. Although Whitman is unincorporated, it has a post office, with the ZIP code of 69366.

== History ==
Whitman was established in the 1880s when the railroad was extended to that point. It was named after the town of Whitman, Massachusetts by a railroad official.

The community was struck by an unwarned tornado on June 25, 2024, which caused damages to houses, trees, and two of the city's three communication towers. One person was injured south of the community.
