= Irwin, Nebraska =

Unincorporated community in Nebraska, U.S.

Coordinates: 42°52′38″N 101°57′18″W

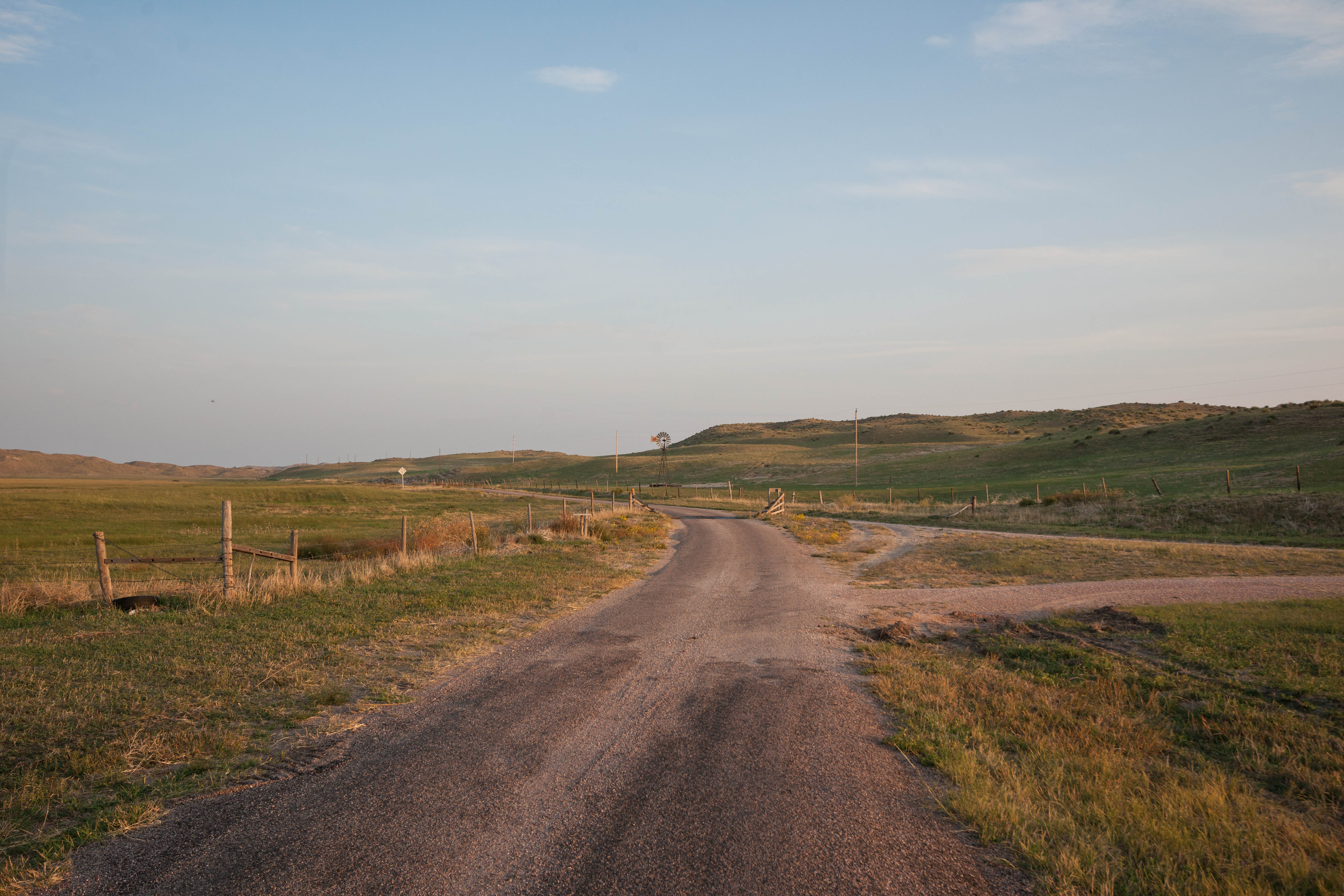
Irwin, Nebraska

Irwin is an unincorporated community in Cherry County, Nebraska, United States.

== History ==
A post office was established at Irwin in 1900, and remained in operation until it was discontinued in 1954. The community was named for Bennett Irwin, a cattleman.
