= Talmo, Kansas =

Unincorporated community in Republic County, Kansas

Coordinates: 39°41′45″N 97°35′17″W

Talmo is an unincorporated community in Republic County, Kansas, United States. It is located northeast of Concordia along K-148 highway between Co Rd 19 and Co Rd 20.

== History ==
A post office was opened in Talmo in 1884, and remained in operation until it was discontinued in 1953.

== Education ==
The community is served by Republic County USD 109 public school district.
