= Roggen, Colorado =

Unincorporated community in Weld County, CO, USA

- Unincorporated community
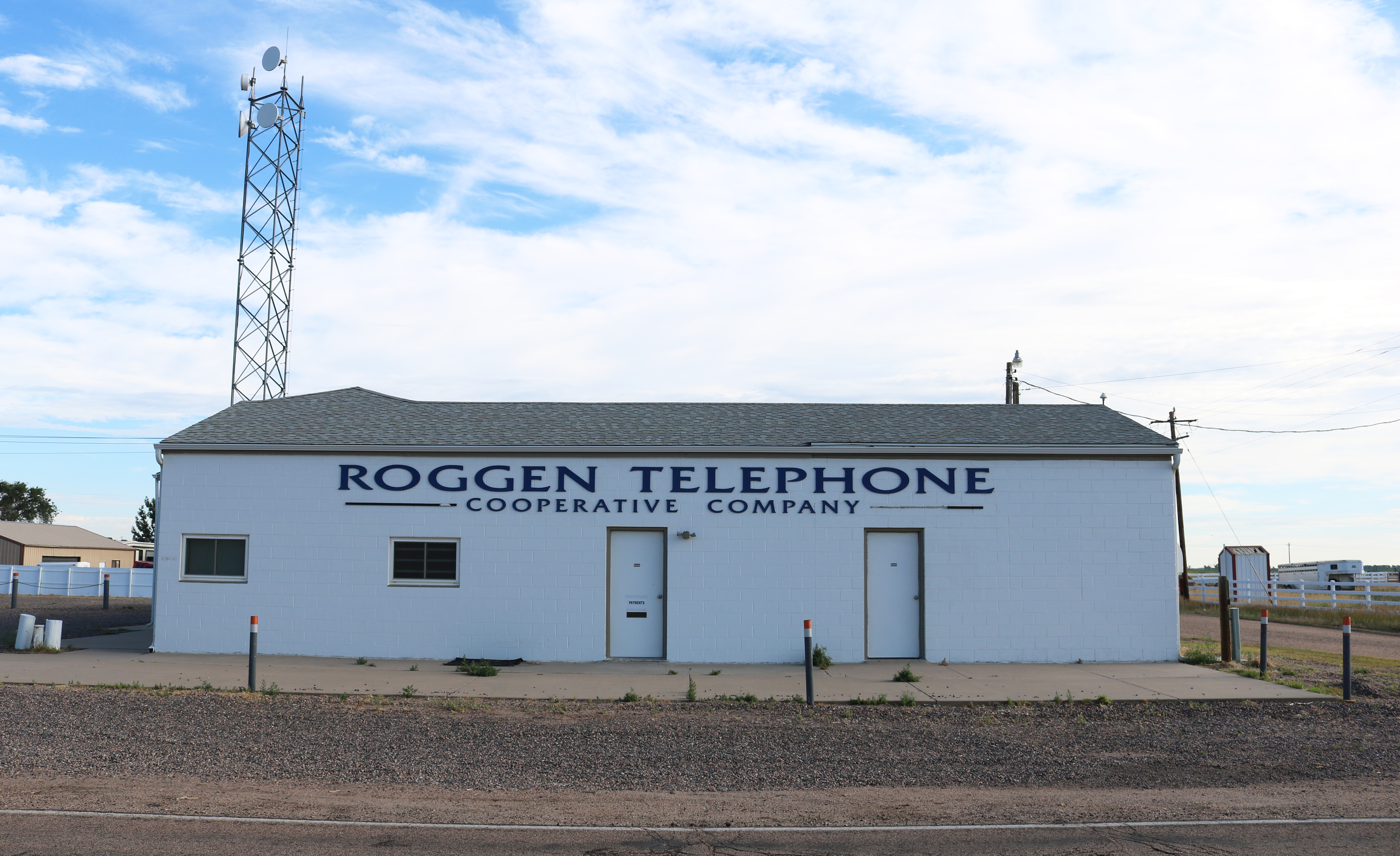
- The Roggen Telephone Cooperative Company headquarters on Front Street in Roggen

- Location in Weld County and the state of Colorado Roggen, Colorado (the United States)
- Coordinates: 40°10′03″N 104°22′20″W
- Country: United States
- State: Colorado
- County: Weld County
- Named for: Edward P. Roggin
- Elevation: 4,712 ft (1,436 m)
- Time zone: UTC-7 (MST)
  - Summer (DST): UTC-6 (MDT)
- ZIP code: 80652
- GNIS feature ID: 204697

Roggen is an unincorporated community and a U.S. Post Office in Weld County, Colorado, United States. The Roggen Post Office has the ZIP Code 80652.

A post office called Roggen has been in operation since 1883. The community most likely derives its name from Edward P. Roggin, a Nebraska legislator.

== Popular culture ==
Roggen plays a minor part in Tom Clancy's novel The Sum of All Fears. Terrorists purchase a safe house near Roggen in preparation for attacking the Super Bowl being played in Denver.

Roggen is the topic of a creepypasta about an archaeological expedition sponsored by the fictional company "Candlelight Co."

== See also ==
- List of cities and towns in Colorado
