= North Carolina Central University =

Historically black university in Durham, North Carolina, US

- Former names: National Religious Training School and Chautauqua for the Colored Race (1910–1915); National Training School (1915–1923); Durham State Normal School for Negroes (1923–1925); North Carolina College for Negroes (1925–1947); North Carolina College at Durham (1947–1969)
- Motto: "Truth and Service"
- Type: Public historically black university
- Established: 1910; 116 years ago
- Parent institution: University of North Carolina
- Accreditation: SACS
- Academic affiliations: TMCF
- Endowment: $89 million (2024)
- Chancellor: Karrie G. Dixon
- Provost: Ontario S. Wooden
- Students: 10,124 (Fall 2026)
- Location: Durham, North Carolina, United States
- Campus: 135 acres (0.55 km^{2}); Large city
- Newspaper: The Campus Echo
- Colors: Maroon and gray
- Nickname: Eagles
- Sporting affiliations: NCAA Division I FCS - MEAC; NEC
- Mascot: Eddie the Eagle
- Website: www.nccu.edu
- North Carolina Central University
- U.S. National Register of Historic Places
- U.S. Historic district
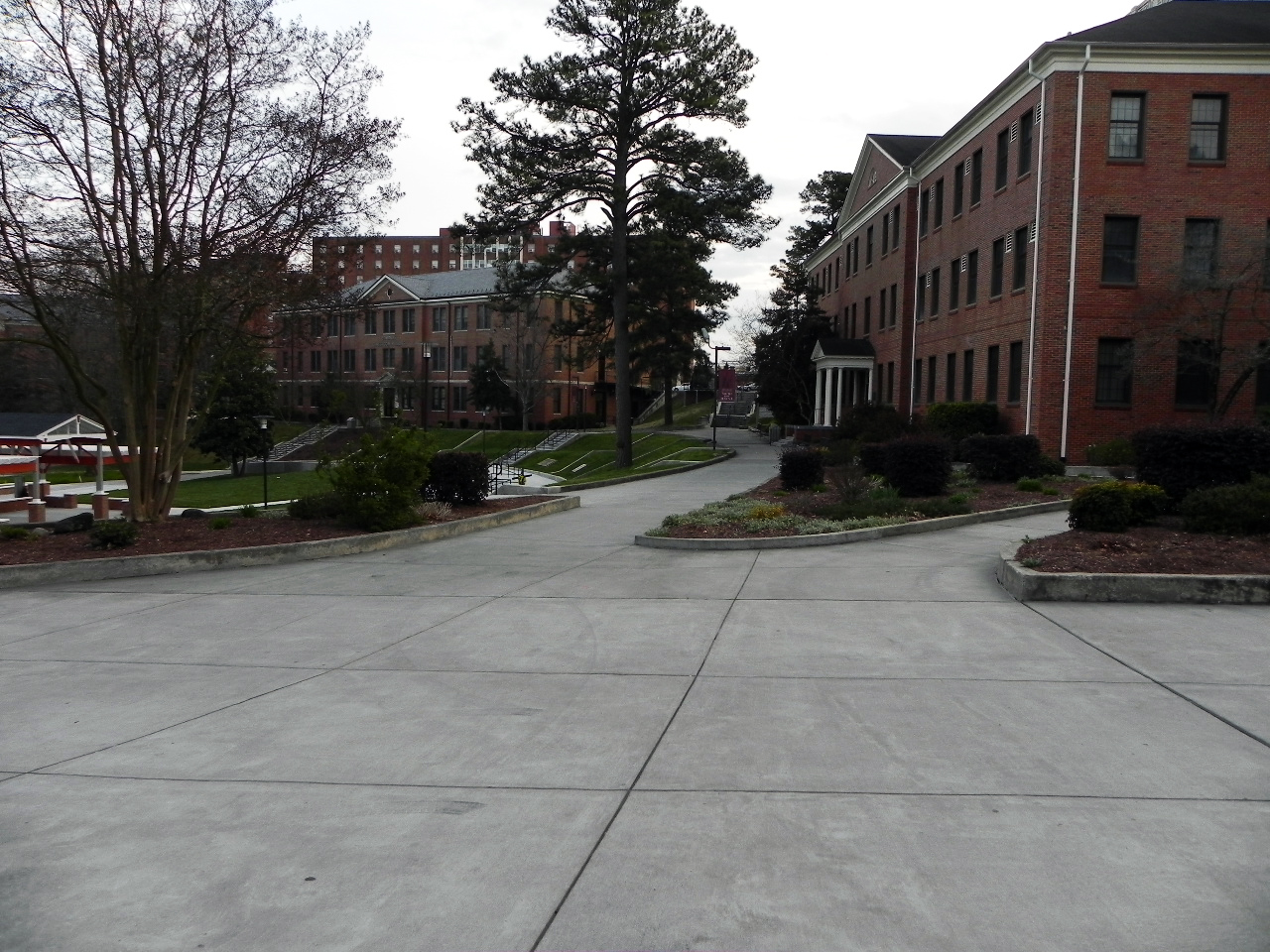
- North Carolina Central University campus

- Location within North Carolina Location within the United States
- Location: Bounded by Lawson St., Alston Ave., Nelson, and Fayetteville Sts., Durham, North Carolina
- Coordinates: 35°58′27″N 78°53′55″W
- Built: 1928
- Architect: Atwood & Nash; Public Works Administration
- Architectural style: Colonial Revival, Georgian Revival
- MPS: Durham MRA
- NRHP reference No.: 86000676
- Added to NRHP: March 28, 1986

North Carolina Central University (NCCU or NC Central) is a public historically black university in Durham, North Carolina, United States. Founded by James E. Shepard in affiliation with the Chautauqua movement in 1909, it was supported by private funds from both Northern and Southern philanthropists. It was made part of the state system in 1923, when it first received state funding and was renamed as Durham State Normal School. It added graduate classes in arts and sciences and professional schools in law and library science in the late 1930s and 1940s.

In 1969, the legislature designated this a regional university and renamed it North Carolina Central University. It has been part of the University of North Carolina system since 1972 and offers programs at the baccalaureate, master's, professional, and doctoral levels. The university is a member of the Thurgood Marshall College Fund. The campus is listed on the National Register of Historic Places.

== History ==
Presidents and chancellors
James E. Shepard	President	1909–1947
Alfonso Elder	President	1948–1963
Samuel P. Massie	President	1963–1966
Albert N. Whiting	President	1967–1972
Albert N. Whiting	Chancellor	1972–1982
LeRoy T. Walker	Chancellor	1983–1986
Tyronza R. Richmond	Chancellor	1986–1992
Donna J. Benson	Interim Chancellor	1992–1993
Julius L. Chambers	Chancellor	1993–2001
James H. Ammons	Chancellor	2001–2007
Beverly Washington Jones	Interim Chancellor	2007–2007
Charlie Nelms	Chancellor	2007–2012
Charles Becton	Interim Chancellor	2012–2013
Debra Saunders-White	Chancellor	2013–2016
Johnson O. Akinleye	Interim Chancellor	2016–2017
Johnson O. Akinleye	Chancellor	2017–2024
Karrie G. Dixon	Chancellor	2024–Present

North Carolina Central University was founded by James E. Shepard as the National Religious Training School and Chautauqua for the Colored Race in the Hayti District. Chautauqua was an educational movement that originated in the Northeast. The school was chartered in 1909 as a private institution and opened on July 5, 1910. Woodrow Wilson, the future U.S. president, contributed some private support for the school's founding.

The school was sold and reorganized in 1915, becoming the National Training School; it was supported by Margaret Olivia Slocum Sage, a philanthropist of New York who was particularly concerned about education. (She founded the Russell Sage Foundation and made generous bequests to several schools.) The National Training School supported Black teacher development in the Jim Crow era, a time when Black education was underfunded by southern states at both the lower and upper levels.

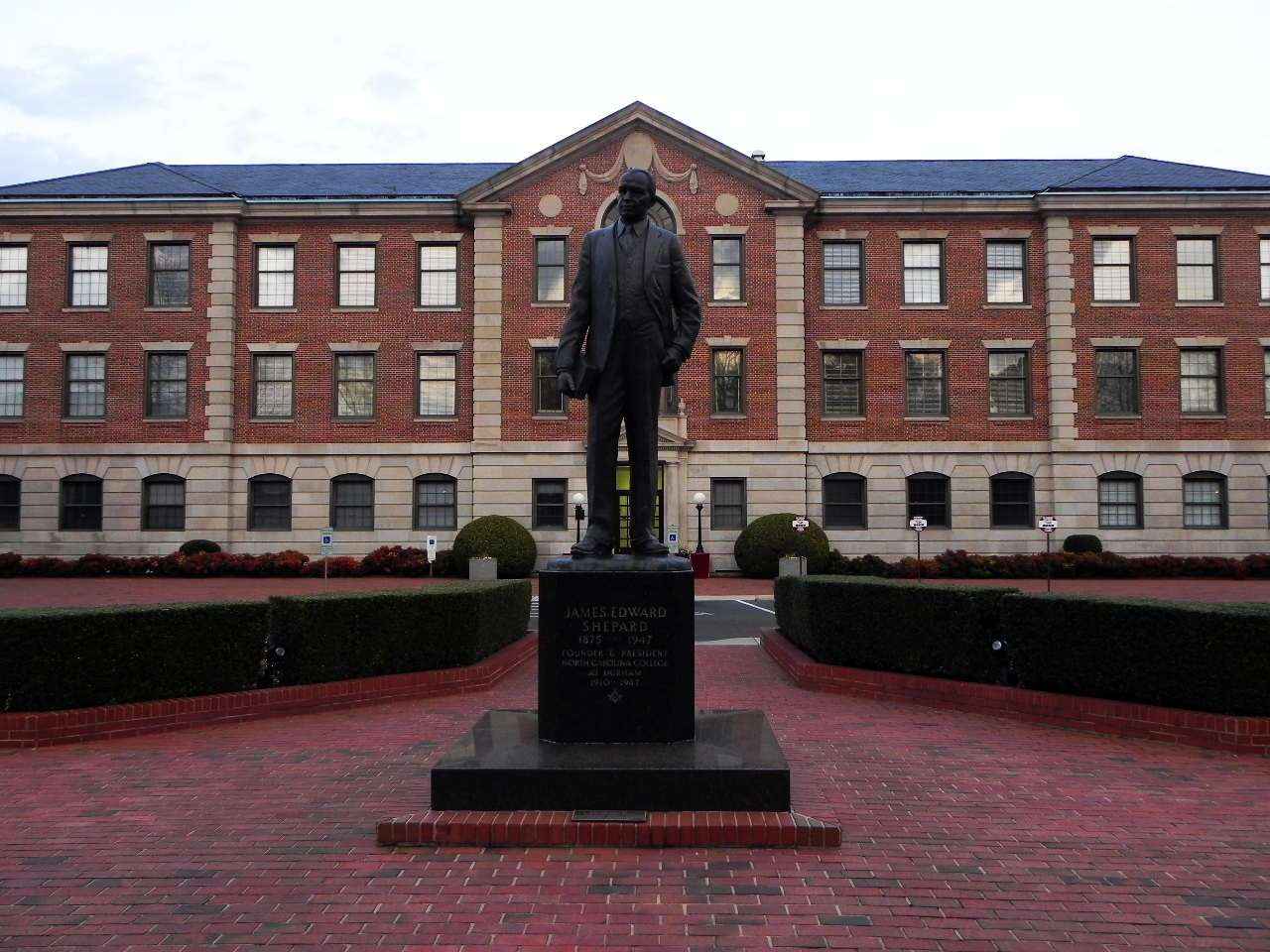
Statue of NCCU founder James E. Shepard. James E. Shepard was also a pharmacist, civil servant and educator. He served as the first president of NCCU for nearly 40 years.

Becoming a state-funded institution in 1923, this school was renamed as Durham State Normal School for Negroes; normal schools trained teachers for elementary grades. In 1925, reflecting the expansion of its programs to a four-year curriculum with a variety of majors, the General Assembly converted the institution into the North Carolina College for Negroes, dedicating it to the offering of liberal arts education and the preparation of teachers and principals of secondary schools. It was the nation's first state-supported liberal arts college for black students. To avoid the state Jim Crow system of segregated passenger cars on trains, Shepard insisted on traveling to Raleigh by car to lobby the legislature. The college's first four-year class graduated in 1929.

The college was accredited by the Southern Association of Colleges and Secondary Schools as an "A" class institution in 1937 and was admitted to membership in that association in 1957. Graduate courses in the School of Arts and Sciences were added in 1939, in the School of Law in 1940, and in the School of Library Science in 1941. A "race relations conference" was held at the college in July 1944.

In 1947, the General Assembly changed the name of the institution to North Carolina College at Durham. On October 6, 1947, Shepard, the founder and president, died. He was succeeded in 1948 by Alfonso Elder. At the time of Elder's election he was serving as head of the Graduate Department of Education and had formerly been dean of the College of Arts and Sciences. Elder retired September 1, 1963. Samuel P. Massie was appointed as the president on August 9, 1963, and resigned on February 1, 1966. On July 1, 1967, Albert N. Whiting assumed the presidency. He served as president and chancellor of the institution. Among the significant developments during his service was the creation of NCCU School of Business. Programs in public administration and criminal justice were also launched. Whiting retired June 30, 1983.

The 1969 General Assembly designated the institution as one of the State's regional universities, and the name was changed to North Carolina Central University. Since 1972, NCCU has been a constituent institution of the University of North Carolina system. On July 1, 1972, the state's four-year colleges and universities were joined to become The Consolidated University of North Carolina, with 16 individual campuses headed by a single president and governed by the University of North Carolina Board of Governors. However, each campus was led by a separate chancellor and a campus-specific board of trustees.

Whiting was succeeded by LeRoy T. Walker as chancellor, followed by Tyronza R. Richmond, Julius L. Chambers (who had previously been director-counsel (chief executive) of the NAACP Legal Defense and Educational Fund), James H. Ammons, Charlie Nelms, and Debra Saunders-White in 2013. Saunders-White was the first woman to hold the office on a permanent basis (Donna Benson was the first woman to serve as interim chancellor of the university). Saunders-White took a leave of absence in 2016, then provost, Johnson O. Akinleye, was appointed as acting chancellor. Following her death in November 2016, Akinleye became interim chancellor.

Johnson O. Akinleye was elected as the 12th chancellor of NCCU on June 26, 2017. In this position, Akinleye has worked to expand the university's academic partnerships, including new agreements with community colleges, as well as introduced a robust online, distance-education program, NCCU Online. He also created K-12 initiatives and implemented a security strategy to increase safety for campus constituents.

Akinleye retired in 2024 and was succeeded by former Elizabeth City State University chancellor Karrie G. Dixon.

== Campus ==
The campus is located about a mile south of downtown Durham, North Carolina, and about three miles east of Duke University. Eleven buildings built before 1940 are included in a national historic district. All of the buildings, except for the three residences, are Georgian Revival-style buildings; they have contemporary fireproof construction with steel trusses and brick exterior walls. They include the James E. Shepard Administration Building, Alexander Dunn Hall, Annie Day Shepard Hall, and five institutional buildings built in the late 1930s under the auspices of the Public Works Administration. The campus was listed on the National Register of Historic Places in 1986. The College Heights Historic District borders the campus.

== Organization ==
NCCU is a part of the University of North Carolina (UNC) System. The campus is governed by a thirteen-member Board of Trustees: eight elected, four appointed, and the president of the Student Government Association also serves as an ex-officio member. The Board elects its officers annually and meets five times per year.

=== Schools and colleges ===
- School of Business (AACSB-accredited)
- School of Education (CAEB-accredited)
- School of Law (ABA- and AALS-accredited)
- School of Library & Information Sciences (ALA-accredited)
- College of Health & Sciences
- College of Arts, Social Sciences & Humanities
- School of Graduate Studies

=== Research institutes ===
- The Julius L. Chambers Biomedical Biotechnology Research Institute (BBRI)
- Biomanufacturing Research Institute and Technology Enterprise (BRITE)

=== Additional programs ===
- University Honors Program (UHP)
- NCCU Online
- Evening & Weekend Degree Programs

== Student life ==
Undergraduate demographics as of Fall 2023
Race and ethnicity	Total
Black	84%
Hispanic	5%
Two or more races	5%
White	4%
Asian	1%
Unknown	1%
Economic diversity
Low-income (Note: The percentage of students who received an income-based federal Pell grant intended for low-income students.)	63%
Affluent (Note: The percentage of students who are a part of the American middle class at the bare minimum.)	37%

=== Student organizations ===
North Carolina Central University has over 130 registered student organizations and 12 honor societies.

==== Student media ====
The students of North Carolina Central University publish the Campus Echo, a bi-weekly newspaper that has been in publication since the school's founding in 1910. The Campus Echo contains articles covering local events, arts and entertainment, and sports among other topics.

== Gallery ==
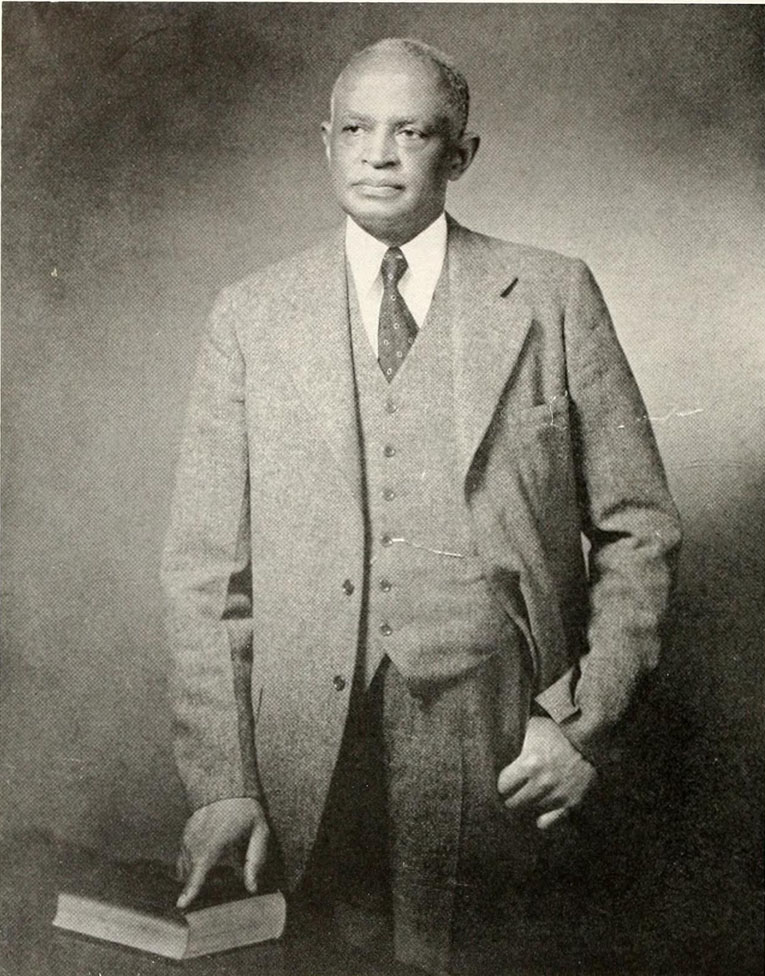
James E. Shepard, c. 1947, founder of the National Religious Training School and Chautauqua for the Colored Race

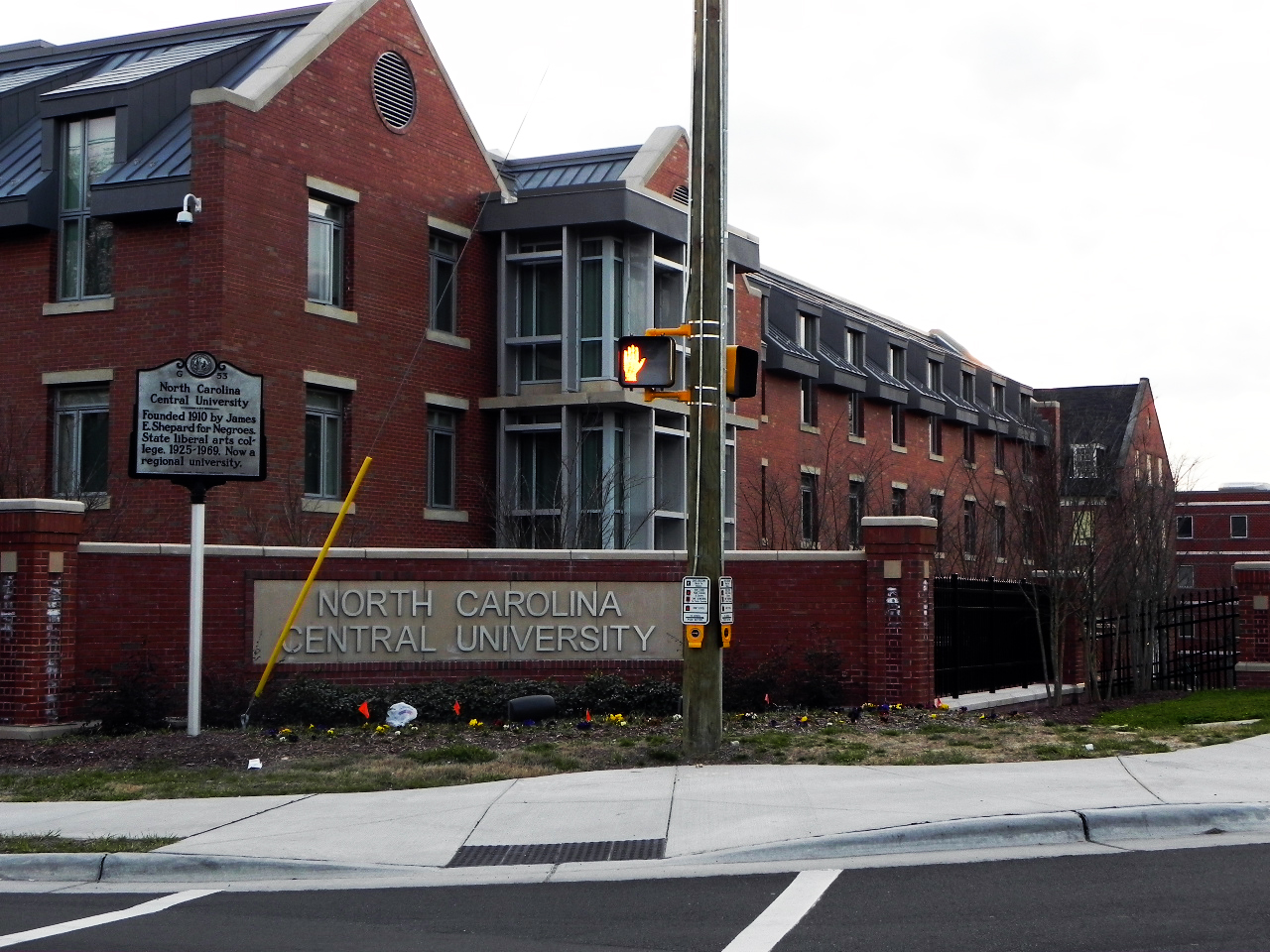
North Carolina Central University entrance seen from S. Alston Avenue

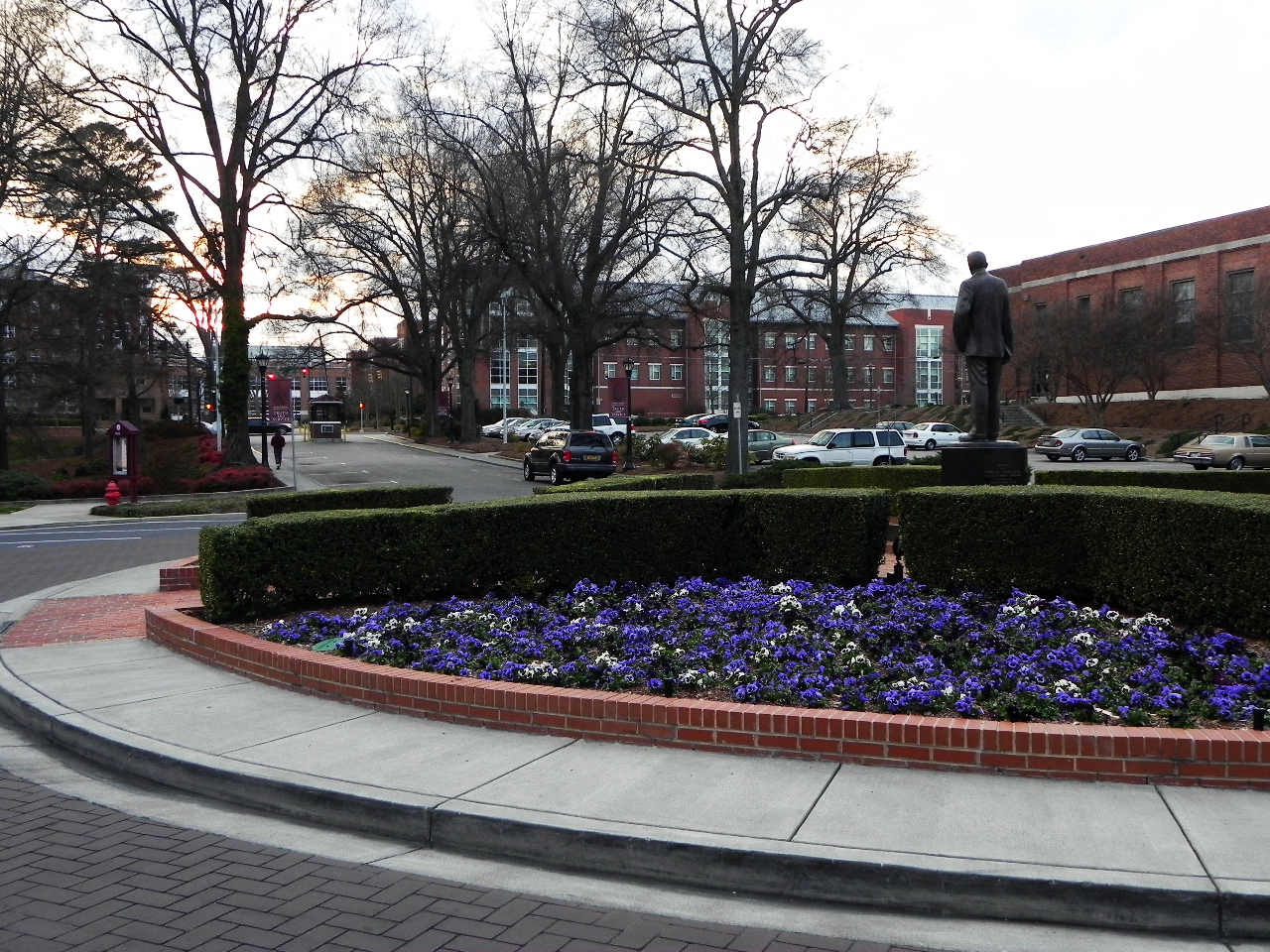
View of the NCCU campus seen from the James E. Shepard Administration Building

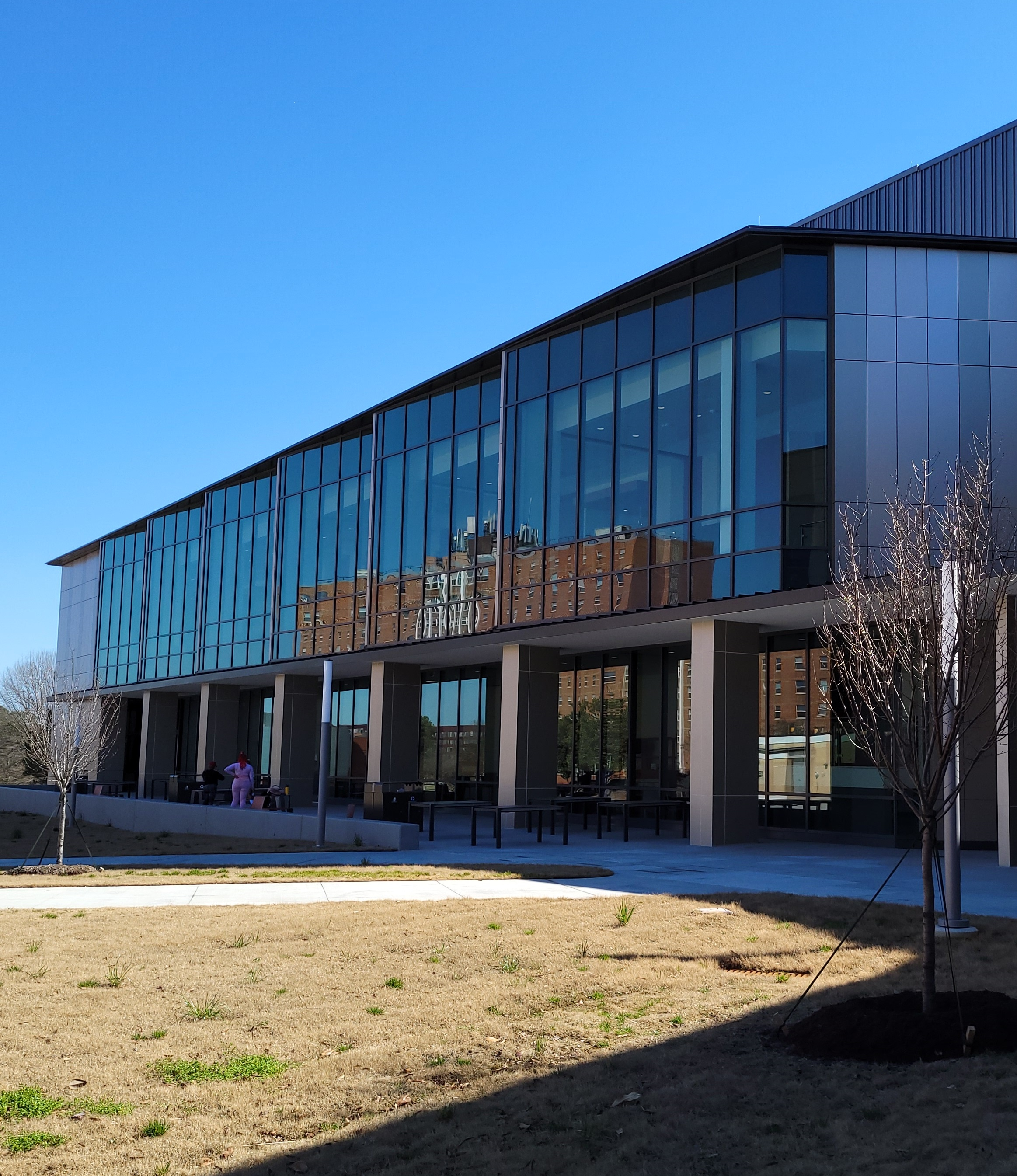
The NCCU Student Center

== Athletics ==
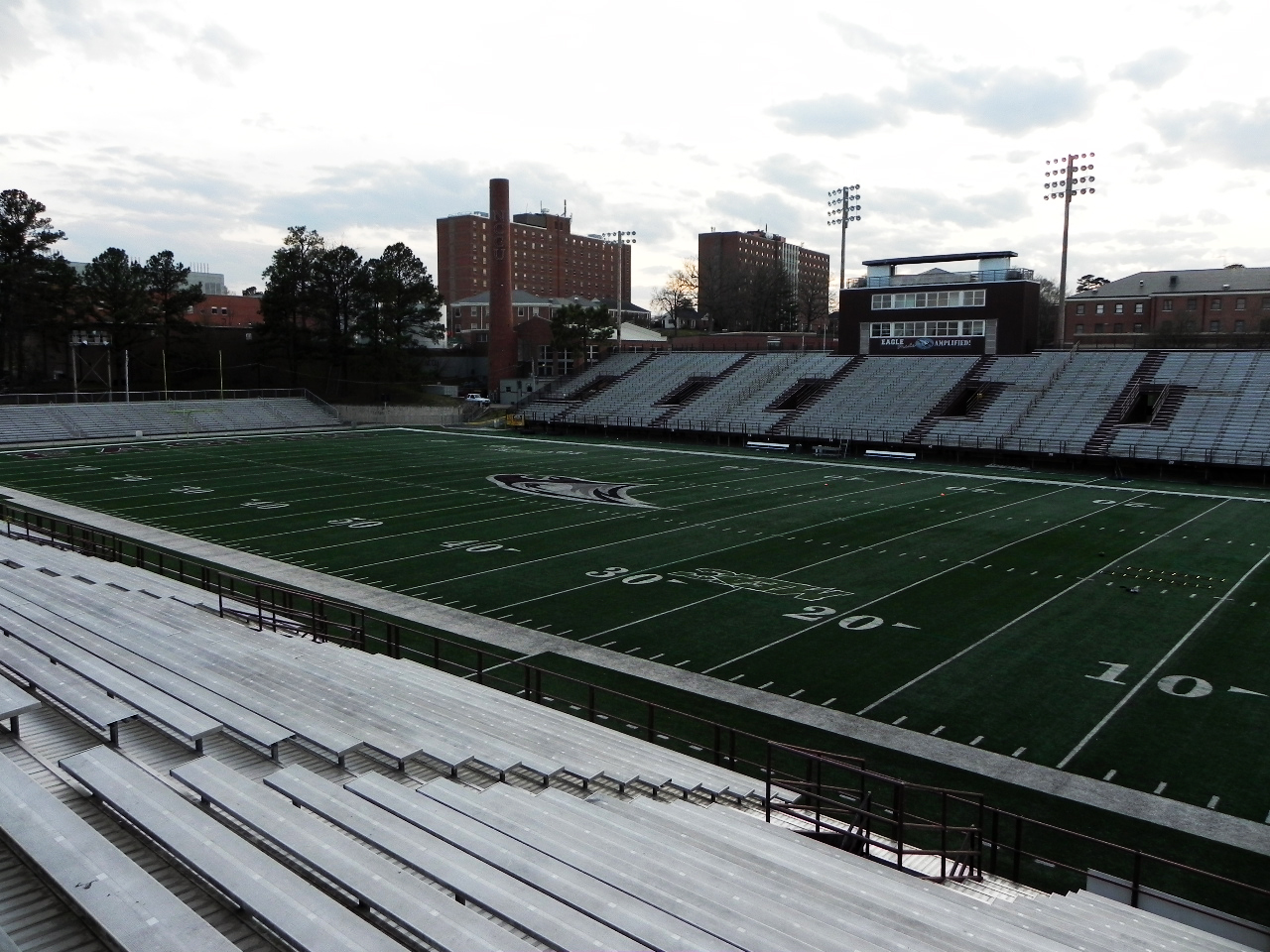
NCCU's O'Kelly-Riddick Stadium home to the MEAC Division I FCS Eagles

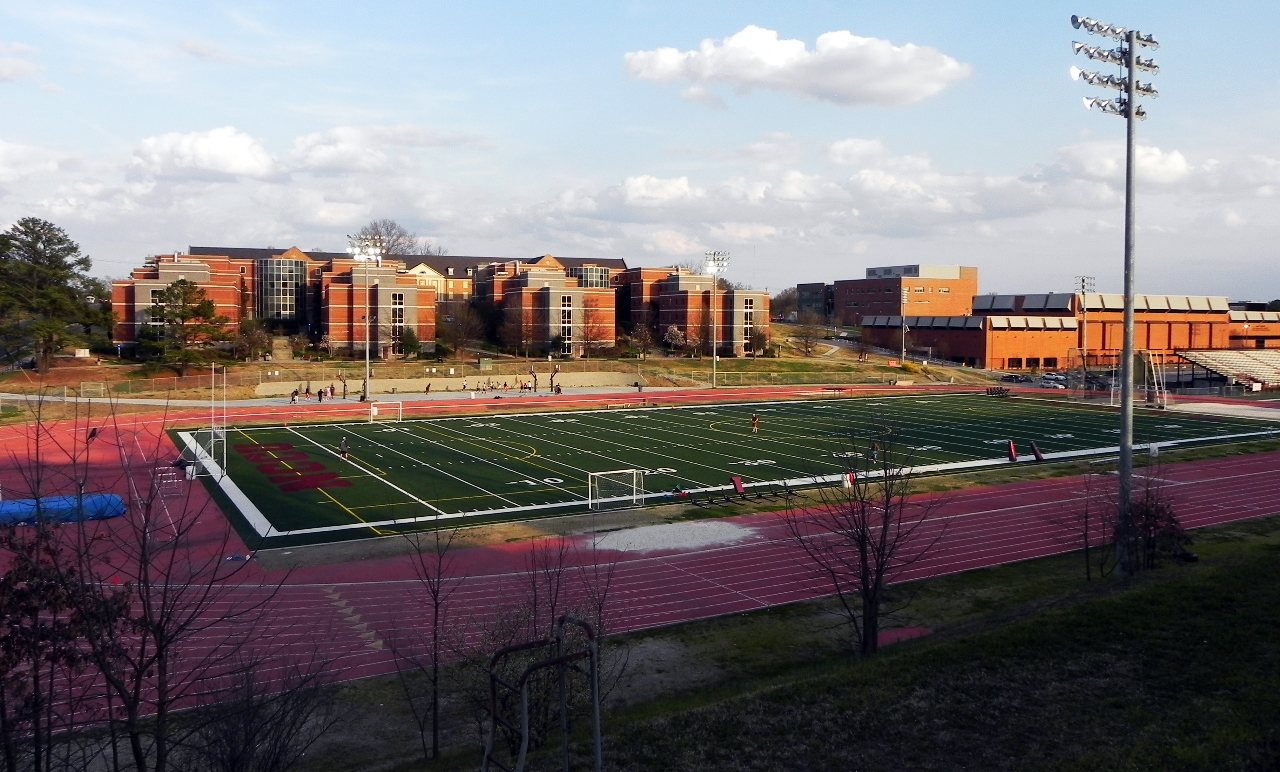
A view of the NCCU track, soccer field along with Richmond Residence Hall and the LeRoy T. Walker Physical Education Complex (far right)

NCCU sponsors 14 men's and women's sports teams that participate in the National Collegiate Athletic Association (NCAA) Division I as a newly readmitted member of the Mid-Eastern Athletic Conference. Athletic teams include football, softball, baseball, basketball, track and field, tennis, volleyball, bowling, and golf.

NCCU championships

Basketball (Men)
Central Intercollegiate Athletic Association Champions (CIAA)	1946, 1950
NCAA Division II Tournament Appearances	1957, 1988, 1989, 1990, 1993, 1996, 1997
NCAA Division II Regional Champions	1989, 1993
NCAA Division II National Champions	1989
Mid-Eastern Athletic Conference Champions (MEAC)	2014, 2015, 2017
Mid-Eastern Athletic Conference (MEAC) Tournament Champions and NCAA Division I Tournament Appearances	2014, 2017, 2018, 2019
Football
Central Intercollegiate Athletic Association Champions (CIAA)	1953, 1954, 1956, 1961, 1963, 1980, 2005, 2006
NCAA Division II Playoff Appearances	1988, 2005, 2006
Mid-Eastern Athletic Conference Champions (MEAC)	1972, 1973, 2014, 2015, 2016, 2022
Track & Field (Men)
Central Intercollegiate Athletic Association Champions (CIAA)	1964, 1965, 1971
Mid-Eastern Athletic Conference Champions (MEAC)	1972, 1973, 1974
NAIA National Champions	1972
Tennis (Men)
Central Intercollegiate Athletic Association Champions (CIAA)	1957, 1958, 1959, 1964, 1965, 1998
Mid-Eastern Athletic Conference Champions (MEAC)	1972, 1973, 1974, 1975
Volleyball (Women)
Central Intercollegiate Athletic Association Champions (CIAA)	1999, 2004, 2005, 2006
NCAA Division II Playoff Appearances	2004, 2005, 2006
Softball
Central Intercollegiate Athletic Association Champions (CIAA)	1998, 1999, 2006
NCAA Division II Playoff Appearances	2006, 2007
Basketball (Women)
Central Intercollegiate Athletic Association Champions (CIAA)	1984, 2007
NCAA Division II Playoff Appearances	1984, 2001, 2002, 2006, 2007
Cross Country (Women)
Central Intercollegiate Athletic Association Champions (CIAA)	2005, 2006
NCAA Division II Regional Champions	2006
Cross Country (Men)
Central Intercollegiate Athletic Association Champions (CIAA)	2004
Bowling (Women)
Central Intercollegiate Athletic Association Champions (CIAA)	2001

== Notable alumni ==
Name	Class year	Notability	Reference(s)
Arenda Wright Allen	1985	judge of the U.S. District Court for the Eastern District of Virginia	
Sunshine Anderson		singer	
Louis Austin		newspaper publisher	
Dorothy F. Bailey	1962	civic leader, Maryland Women's Hall of Fame inductee	
Frank Ballance	1963	former member of the U.S. House of Representatives (North Carolina 1st district)	
Ernie Barnes	1960	artist and former professional football player	
Larry Black		Olympic track & field gold and silver medalist	
Dan Blue	1970	multiple African-American "firsts": North Carolina Speaker of the House; president of National Conference of State Legislatures	
Herman Boone	1958	former high school football coach, profiled in the motion picture Remember the Titans	
Julia Boseman	1992	State Senator (North Carolina)	
Jim Brewington		former professional football player	
Wanda G. Bryant	1982	North Carolina Court of Appeals jurist	
G. K. Butterfield	1974	Congressman and former Associate Justice, North Carolina Supreme Court	
Phonte Coleman		rapper	
Kim Coles		comedian and actress	
Julius L. Chambers	1958	lawyer, civil rights leader, and educator; founded the first integrated law firm in North Carolina	
Sammie Chess, Jr.	1956, 1958	attorney, civil rights activist, and judge in North Carolina. He was the first Black Superior Court justice in North Carolina history.	
Eva M. Clayton		former member of the U.S. House of Representatives (North Carolina's 1st district)	
Lee Davis	1968	former professional basketball player, 1-time ABA all-star	
Morris "Moe" Davis	1983	United States Air Force officer, lawyer, administrative law judge, and Democratic nominee for Congress in North Carolina's 11th Congressional District in 2020; appointed the third Chief Prosecutor of the Guantanamo military commissions, where he served from September 2005 until his resignation in October 2007 citing objections over the use of waterboarding in obtaining evidence	
Ivan Dixon	1954	actor, Hogan's Heroes	
Patrick Douthit ("9th Wonder")	2026	Grammy award-winning hip-hop producer, college lecturer and former teaching fellow at Harvard University	
Mike Easley	1976	former Governor of North Carolina	
Rick Elmore	1982	North Carolina Court of Appeals jurist	
Harold T. Epps Sr.	1948, 1950	prominent North Carolina attorney who was instrumental in desegregating the University of North Carolina School of Law	
Stormie Forte	2002	first African-American woman and openly LGBTQ woman to serve on the Raleigh City Council	
Charles Foster		Hurdler at the 1976 Summer Olympics	
Robert D. Glass	1949	first African American justice of the Connecticut Supreme Court	
Bill Hayes	1965	former head football coach at Winston Salem State University and North Carolina A&T State University; current athletic director at Winston-Salem State University	
Harold Hunter		first African-American to sign a contract with the NBA; former coach for Tennessee State, player for North Carolina College	
Maynard Jackson	1964	first black mayor of Atlanta; graduate of NC Central University School of Law	
Sam Jones		NBA Hall of Famer	
Vernon Jones		politician, former Georgia state legislator, and former chief executive officer of DeKalb County, Georgia	
Stanton Kidd		professional basketball player	
Eleanor Kinnaird		Member of the North Carolina Senate (23rd district)	
Clarence Lightner		first black mayor of Raleigh, N.C.	
Bishop Eddie Long		Senior Pastor, New Birth Missionary Baptist Church, Lithonia, Georgia	
Lillian M. Lowery		Superintendent of the Maryland State Department of Education	
Jeanne Lucas		first black elected to the North Carolina Senate	
Daniel Sharpe Malekebu	1913	first Malawian medical graduate; doctor, missionary, and anti-colonial activist	
Crystal Mangum		false accuser in the Duke lacrosse case and convicted murderer	
Robert Massey	1989	former NFL defensive back and current head football coach at Shaw University	
Tressie McMillan Cottom	2009	published author, sociologist, and professor	
Henry "Mickey" Michaux		member of the North Carolina House of Representatives (31st district)	
LeVelle Moton	1996	former NC Central basketball player and current head coach of the men's basketball team	
Elaine O'Neal	1984	first African-American female Mayor of Durham	
Ida Stephens Owens	1961	biochemist at the National Institutes of Health (NIH)	
Greg Peterson	2007	former professional football player	
Xavier Proctor	2013	football player	
Charles Romes	1977	former professional football player	
Ben Ruffin	1964	civil rights activist, educator, and businessman	
Julius Sang		former Kenyan track athlete	
Richard Sligh	1966	professional football player-Oakland Raiders (California) and Cincinnati "Bengals" (Ohio); "Tallest Pro Football Player"	
Al Stewart	J.D.	acting United States Secretary of Labor (2021)	
Ted G. Stone	M.A. 1958	Southern Baptist evangelist and recovered amphetamine addict	
André Leon Talley		editor-at-large, Vogue	
Cressie Thigpen	1968	North Carolina Court of Appeals jurist	
Donald van der Vaart		former Secretary of the North Carolina Department of Environmental Quality	
Ernie Warlick		former AFL and CFL professional football player	
Doug Wilkerson		former professional football player	
Leonardo Williams		Mayor of Durham, North Carolina	
Zwelibanzi Moyo Williams		chef, restauranteur, and First Lady of Durham	
Paul Winslow		former professional football player	
Christian Worley	2020	civil rights activist	
Yahzarah	attended	singer	
David Young		former professional basketball player	
Andraya Yearwood	2020-2024	Transgender American track and field athlete	

== See also ==
- National Register of Historic Places listings in Durham County, North Carolina
