= Carol Martin =

Carol Martin may refer to:

- Carol Martin (politician) (born 1957), Australian politician
- Carol Martin (athlete) (born 1948), track-and-field athlete
- Carol Martin (journalist), American journalist and news anchor
- C. Dianne Martin, American computer scientist
- Carol Vance Martin, alter-ego of DC Comic character Wildfire
