= Charles Becton =

American lawyer

Charles L. Becton is an attorney, former judge of the North Carolina Court of Appeals, and former president of the North Carolina Bar Association (the first African-American male to hold that post). In 2012–2013, he was the interim chancellor of North Carolina Central University following the retirement of Charlie Nelms. Then, shortly before he was due to complete that assignment, he was named interim chancellor of Elizabeth City State University following the retirement of Willie Gilchrist, effective July 1, 2013.

A native of Morehead City, North Carolina, Becton spent his formative years in Ayden. Becton was educated at Howard University (B.A., 1966), Duke University School of Law (Juris Doctor, 1969), and the University of Virginia School of Law (LL.M., 1986).

Gov. Jim Hunt appointed Becton to the N.C. Court of Appeals in January 1981 to replace Richard Erwin. He was then elected to complete the remaining two years of the unexpired term in 1982, and elected in 1984 to a full eight-year term. He resigned in 1990 to go into private personal injury practice. Becton has also taught at the University of North Carolina School of Law and at the Duke University School of Law.
