= Roger McLean =

American politician

Roger Allen McLean, Sr. (born October 24, 1949) is an American politician and the former mayor of Elizabeth City, North Carolina. A Democrat, McLean held the mayoral office following a 2008 runoff election. Roger McLean died on March 30, 2016.

== Political career ==
Prior to his mayoral election, McLean worked from 1974 to 1996 at Elizabeth City State University, he served during his tenure as the Comptroller and Chief Financial Officer for Elizabeth City State University.

He has also served in the Elizabeth City Chamber of Commerce on the Board of Directors, and on the Elizabeth City Housing Authority and Planning Board.

In the 2008 mayoral election, Roger McLean ran with a strong focus on reducing the electric department budget, and, in the initial election, did not receive a majority over candidates Don Cherry and H. Rick Gardner. The following month, McLean defeated runner-up candidate Gardner by a margin of 392 votes.

On February 8, 2010, McLean entered into a discussion with the North Carolina Electric Municipal Agency, the supplier of electricity for Elizabeth City, and considered the sudden termination of a contract which committed the city to repay a debt incurred to NCEMPA and to purchase electricity solely from this agency. Given the possibility that this termination could result in a lawsuit from the other 31 cities which comprise NCEMPA filing a lawsuit against Elizabeth City, McLean suggested to let "ElectriCities sue us." Which was a very brave but much needed statement

== Personal life ==
McLean was born in Robeson County and obtained his B.S. in accounting at N.C. Central University. He resided in Elizabeth City until his death.
