= Weldon City Schools =

School district in North Carolina, United States

Weldon City School District or Weldon City Schools is a school district headquartered in Weldon, North Carolina.

As of 2013 it, along with the Halifax County School District, has a student body that is almost all of races other than non-Hispanic white, while the student body of Roanoke Rapids Graded School District is 70% white.

== Schools ==
- Weldon STEM High Career Academies (Weldon High School)
- Weldon Middle School
- Weldon Elementary Global Academy
- Roanoke Valley Early College
