= Stacey Franklin Jones =

American mathematician, systems engineer, and academic administrator

5th Chancellor of Elizabeth City State University
- In office October 1, 2014 – December 31, 2015
- Preceded by: Charles Becton (interim)
- Succeeded by: Thomas Conway, Jr.

Personal details
- Children: 2
- Education: Howard University; Johns Hopkins University; George Washington University
- Website: staceyfranklinjones.com

Stacey Franklin Jones is an American computer scientist, and academic administrator who was the fifth chancellor of Elizabeth City State University from 2014 to 2015.

== Life ==
Jones is from Boston. She earned a B.S. in mathematics, magna cum laude, from Howard University in 1982. From 1982 to 1993, she worked in Maryland for Northrop Grumman as a defense and electronic systems software engineer and product development manager. She completed M.S. degrees in numerical science (1986) and technical management (1991) at Johns Hopkins University. In 1997, Jones earned a Ph.D. in computer science from the George Washington University. Her dissertation was titled, Major Cost Categories for a Rough-Order-Magnitude Cost Model for Multimedia Computer-based Training. C. Dianne Martin was her doctoral advisor.

In 1997, Jones joined the computer science department at Johns Hopkins University as a research scientist and adjunct faculty member. She joined Benedict College in 2000 as the chair of the mathematics and computer science department. She served as its dean of the school of science, technology, engineering and mathematics from 2002 to 2008. Jones became the vice president of sponsored programs and research in 2007 and senior vice president in 2009. In July 2010, she became the provost and vice president for academic affairs of Bowie State University. In the fall of 2011, she returned to the private sector. On October 1, 2014, Jones became the fifth chancellor and tenth chief executive officer of Elizabeth City State University. Succeeding interim chancellor, Charles Becton, she is the first female in the role. Jones resigned on December 31, 2015. From August 2016 to January 2018, she was the interim provost and vice president for academic affairs at Norfolk State University. She became the special projects assistant to the interim president in February 2018. In 2018, she joined Fairmont State University as its vice president for institutional effectiveness and strategic operations.

Jones has two children.
