= Samuel P. Massie =

Organic chemist

Samuel P. Massie Jr
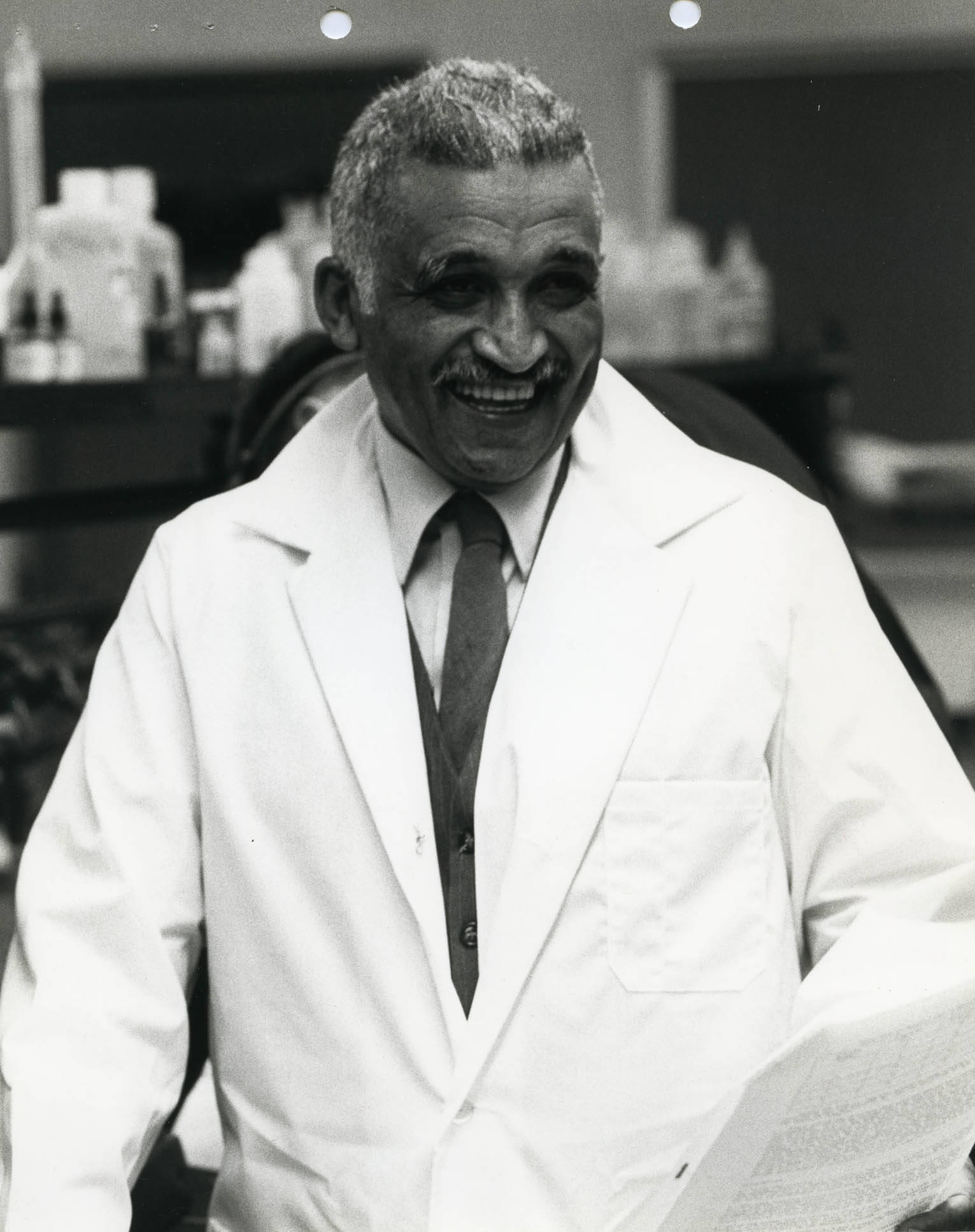
- Samuel P. Massie
- Born: Samuel Proctor Massie; July 3, 1919; Little Rock, Arkansas, US
- Died: April 10, 2005 (aged 85); Laurel, Maryland, US
- Education: University of Arkansas at Pine Bluff; Fisk University; Iowa State University
- Known for: Chemistry of phenothiazine; First African-American professor at the U.S. Naval Academy
- Spouse: Gloria Thompkins Massie
- Scientific career
- Fields: Chemistry
- Workplaces: Ames Laboratory (on the Manhattan Project); Langston University; Fisk University; Howard University; National Science Foundation; North Carolina College at Durham; U.S. Naval Academy
- Thesis: High-molecular weight compounds of nitrogen and sulfur as therapeutic agents (1946)
- Doctoral advisor: Henry Gilman

Samuel Proctor Massie Jr. (July 3, 1919 – April 10, 2005) was a chemist who studied a variety of chemicals that contributed towards the development of therapeutic drugs, including the chemistry of phenothiazine. As one of the African American scientists and technicians on the Manhattan Project to develop atomic bombs in World War II Massie worked with uranium isotopes. Massie was named one of the top 75 distinguished contributors to chemistry in history by Chemical and Engineering News.

Massie was elected as the third President of North Carolina College at Durham in 1963, and he became the first African-American professor at the U.S. Naval Academy in 1966. He was a leading educator who promoted the participation of African-Americans in education. University chairs have been endowed and named in his honor, as well as an elementary school.

== Early life and education ==
Massie was born on July 3, 1919, in Little Rock, Arkansas. He was the eldest of two sons of Earlee Jacko Massie and Samuel Proctor Massie Sr. His parents were members of a college fraternity and sorority, and both were educators. Massie Sr was a pastor of the African Methodist Episcopal Church (A.M.E.), and a civil rights activist.

Massie Jr graduated from Dunbar High School at the age of 13 after following his teacher mother from class to class, and then worked at a grocery store to earn tuition fees for studying at Dunbar Junior College in Little Rock. He applied to the University of Arkansas but was rejected because of his race. (In 1970, the university awarded him an honorary PhD.) Instead, he graduated summa cum laude with a Bachelor of Science in chemistry in 1937 at the age of 18, from the Arkansas Agricultural, Mechanical, and Normal College (Arkansas AM&N, now called University of Arkansas at Pine Bluff). He chose chemistry because his father suffered from asthma, and he wanted to help find a cure.

Massie gained a master's degree in chemistry from Fisk University in Tennessee in 1940 on a scholarship, then taught for a year at Arkansas AM&N before going on to study for his PhD at Iowa State University. His supervisor was Henry Gilman, who was working on the Manhattan Project. Racial segregation at the university prevented him from living on campus, so he had to travel miles to university, where he was also not allowed to work in the same laboratories as white students. He said: "The laboratory for the white boys was on the second floor next to the library. My laboratory was in the basement next to the rats. Separate but equal."

In the second year of his doctoral studies in 1943, his father died from an asthma attack. When he returned to Arkansas for the funeral, he sought an extension of his military draft deferment, and was rejected with a racial slur about being over-educated. He turned to Gilman, who ensured he movied him onto the Manhattan Project. Massie later said, "All of us had to make a decision how we would serve the war efforts. I dropped out of school and went into the chemical warfare service". Massie worked in the Ames Laboratory, researching the conversion of uranium isotopes into liquid compounds that could be used in the atomic bomb. He worked on the Manhattan Project from 1943 to 1945, developing keloid scars on his back due to radiation exposure, and witnessing colleagues next to him being caught in a laboratory explosion. After the war, Massie completed his PhD, which involved testing compounds for therapeutic activity.

== Career ==
After his PhD and teaching for a time at Fisk University, Massie joined the faculty of Langston University in Oklahoma, where he taught from 1947 to 1953. He became the first African-American president of the Oklahoma Academy of Science. In 1953, he returned to Fisk University, where he taught until 1960. In 1954, he published a paper, The Chemistry of Phenothiazine, in Chemical Reviews a classic in the field from which anti-psychotic medications were developed. Chemical Reviews had more than 500 requests for copies of the paper, from 50 countries.

In 1960, Massie moved to Washington, D.C., taking on the role of Associate Program Director for Special Projects in Science Education at the National Science Foundation (NSF), helping improve college laboratories nationwide. He was also a professor at Howard University. In 1963, he became the third President of North Carolina College at Durham.

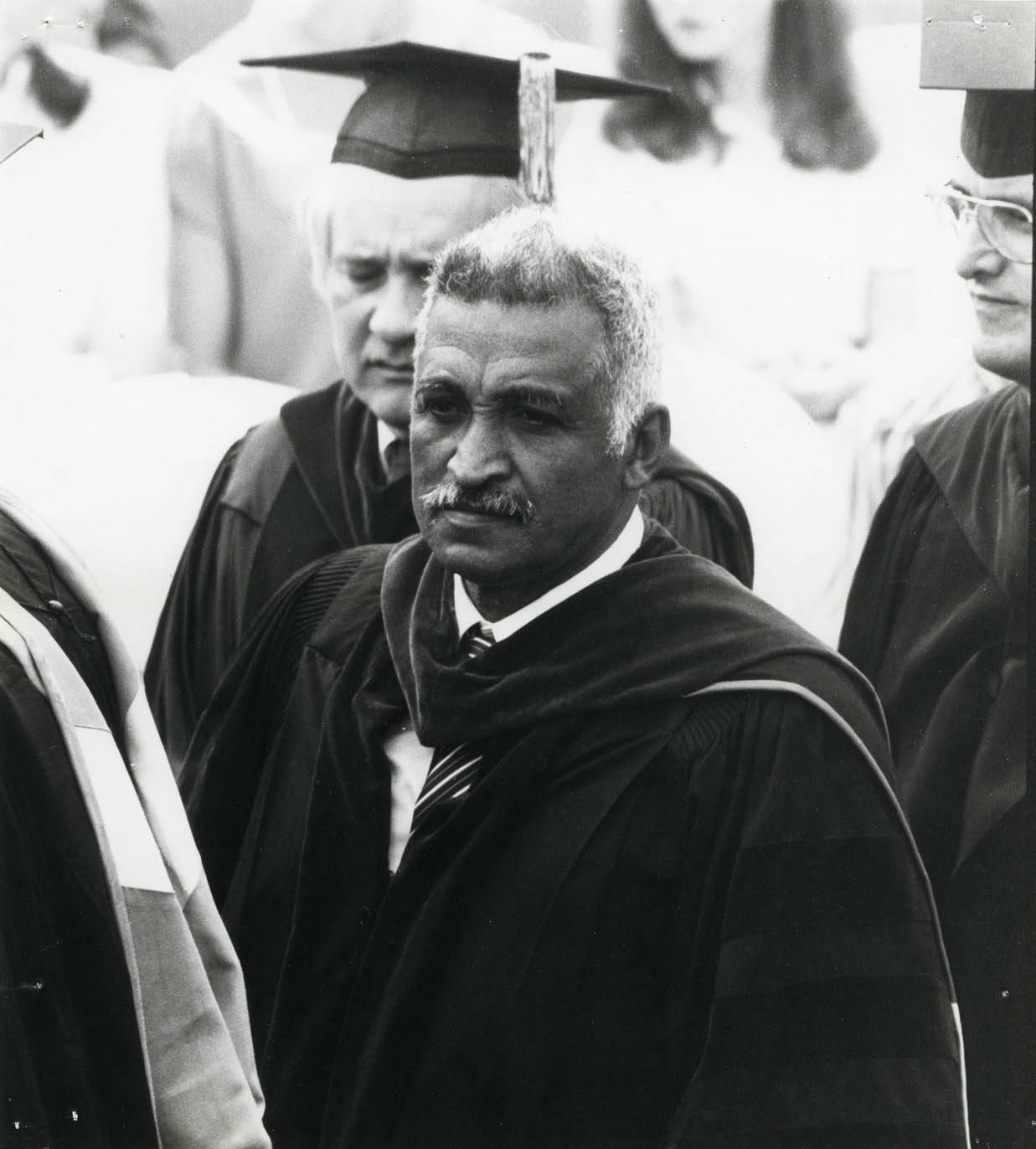
Samuel P. Massie in academic formal dress, U.S. Naval Academy

Massie was appointed to the faculty of the United States Naval Academy by President Johnson in 1966, its first African-American professor. During his tenure in Annapolis, Massie served on the academy's equal employment opportunity committee and helped establish a black studies program. He retired from the post in 1993. Massie subsequently became the vice president of Bingwa Software Company, developing multicultural educational software.

In 1984, he and others were granted a patent for a chemical compound to treat gonorrhea, malaria, and bacterial infections, which was assigned to the US Department of the Army.

== Honors ==
In 1994, the US Department of Energy created the Dr. Samuel P. Massie Chair of Excellence, a $14.7 million grant to nine historically black colleges and one for Hispanic students to further environmental research. His portrait was hung in the National Academy of Sciences Gallery in 1995.

In 1998, he was voted by the readers of Chemical and Engineering News as one of the top 75 distinguished contributors to chemistry in history.

An elementary school in Prince George's County, Maryland, is named in Massie's honor.

== Personal life ==
In 1947, Massie married Gloria Bell Thompkins, who he met after the World War II when he was teaching at Fisk University. Gloria Massie was a psychology professor at Bowie State University, and was a social columnist for Jet magazine. The Massies had three sons. They lived in Laurel, Maryland, because when he joined the US Naval Academy, real estate agents refused to show them homes in good areas, due to their color. Gloria died on January 22, 2005, and Massie, who had dementia, died soon after, on April 10, 2005, aged 85. He also self-published a short autobiography with the collaboration of Robert C. Hayden in 2005.

| Preceded by Alfonso Elder | President of North Carolina Central University; 1963–1966 | Succeeded by Albert N. Whiting |
