= Albert Whiting =

Albert Whiting may refer to:

- Albert Whiting (cricketer) (1866–1946), Australian cricketer
- Albert N. Whiting (1917–2020), American academic administrator
- Jack Whiting (actor) (Albert Draper Whiting, Jr., 1901–1961), American actor, singer and dancer
