= Peter Weddick Moore =

American educator and university president

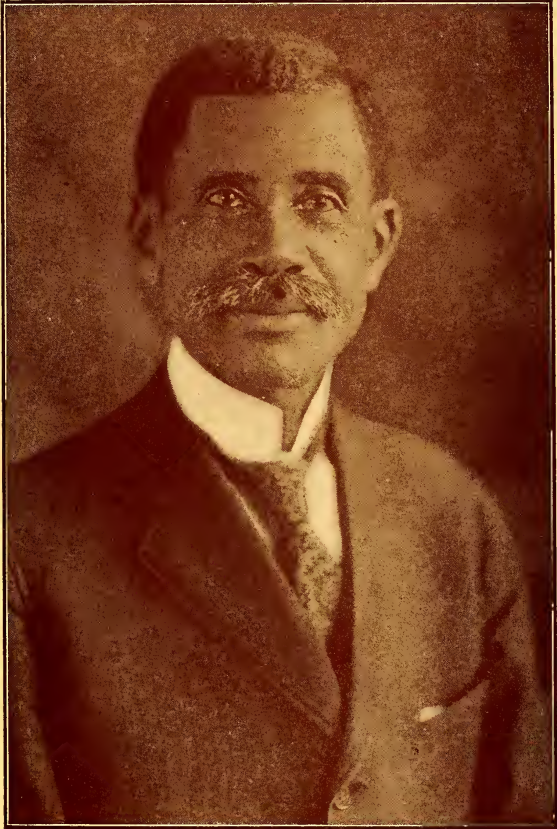
- Born: June 24, 1859; Duplin County, North Carolina
- Died: April 15, 1934 (aged 74)
- Known for: Contributions to education, improved race relations

Academic background
- Education: Shaw University (AB)

Academic work
- Era: Post-Civil War - Great Depression

Peter Weddick Moore (June 24, 1859 – April 15, 1934) was a North Carolina educator and the first president of Elizabeth City State University. Educated by Sampson County public schools and Shaw University, Moore later became an assistant principal at the Normal School at Plymouth, until he built and became principal of what is now known as the Elizabeth City State University. Moore fought strongly against the segregation of education and society as well as for equality among whites and blacks. Throughout his life, Moore contributed greatly to the achievements of the North Carolina Teachers' Association and held every role within the organization.

== Early life ==
Moore grew up in Duplin County, North Carolina. Born to two slave parents, he had a tumultuous childhood. His father is believed to have been killed by the Ku Klux Klan, so his mother was forced to raise him and his four siblings alone. Moore's mother believed that her children should all be educated and saw to it that Moore went to school during his upbringing. He was said to have gone to a neighborhood school created by the Freedmen's Bureau. He went on to study at the Philosophian Academy in a neighboring county, where he was able to develop his academic interests. After graduation, Moore became certified to teach in a one-room school, allowing him to further pursue his passion for academia.

== Adulthood ==
=== Education ===
Moore was recognized by his peers as a man of dignity, who was well-informed of current events. He received an A.B. degree in 1887 from Shaw University. Shaw also awarded him both M.A. and LL.D. degrees in recognition of his many contributions to education in the state. Moore's career began when he started teaching in the Holly Grove district at age 20. He saved the money earned from teaching and raising cotton to supplement his education at Shaw University.

=== Career ===
Post-graduation, Peter Moore began teaching again for a year before he was given the position of assistant principal at the State Normal School in Plymouth, North Carolina. In 1891, four years after beginning in Plymouth, Moore was asked to be the new leader of the State Colored Normal School at Elizabeth City. After the school opened, it split into three separate schools: Elizabeth City State, Fayetteville State, and Winston-Salem State Normal Schools. Moore served as the principal until 1928 when he retired, just six years before his death.

== Legacy ==
Despite his declining health, Moore continued to teach classroom management in his retirement. In 1928 he was granted the title of President Emeritus by Elizabeth State University. This position included a home and salary for the remainder of his life. Moore is credited as the reason that relations between whites and African Americans were so positive in Elizabeth City.
