= C. Dianne Martin =

American computer scientist

Carol Dianne Briggs Martin
- Spouse: David H. Martin
- Awards: Ada Lovelace Award

Academic background
- Education: Western Maryland College; University of Maryland, College Park

Academic work
- Discipline: Computer science
- Sub-discipline: Computer science education
- Institutions: University of North Carolina; George Washington University
- Doctoral students: Stacey Franklin Jones

Carol Dianne Briggs Martin (born c. 1943/44) is an American computer scientist, former Vice Provost for Faculty Affairs at George Washington University and first Senior Faculty Fellow of the North Carolina (NC) Study Center. As of 2018 she teaches at the University of North Carolina (UNC) Department of Computer Science and the School of Information and Library Sciences.

== Biography ==
Martin attended the Wachusett Regional High School in Holden, Massachusetts, where as a sophomore in 1959 she became one of the first students to attend the Berg Science Seminars. She then moved to Maryland, where she graduated from the Oxon Hill High School in 1961. She earned a bachelor's degree in economics and mathematics education in 1965 from Western Maryland College (now McDaniel College). In the 1960s, she was a programmer for IBM that worked on the Apollo space project. She worked on the Apollo 11 mission which was the first mission to put a man on the moon and was part of Mission Control for Apollo 8.

Martin returned to school for a master's degree in computer science in 1972 from the University of Maryland, College Park. She joined the George Washington University faculty in 1983 as a computer science instructor, earned an Ed.D. in teacher education in 1987 from GWU, and was promoted to full professor in 1998. She was a program director at the National Science Foundation from 1998 to 2000, chief policy officer at GeoTrust from 2000 to 2001, and chair of the GWU computer science department from 2002 to 2005. From 2005 to 2007 she took a leave of absence from GWU as Dean of the College of Information Systems at Zayed University in Dubai.

Martin has been a member of the McDaniel College board of trustees, and presented the keynote address at McDaniel's 1994 homecoming.

Her husband, David H. Martin (1939–2014) directed the United States Office of Government Ethics from 1983 to 1987.

== Awards ==
- In 1999 she became a Fellow of the Association for Computing Machinery "for extraordinary leadership and innovation in computer science education and for service to ACM and the profession."
- In 2005, she was given the Ada Lovelace Award for her accomplishments and contributions on behalf of women in computing.
