= Alfonso Elder =

Second president of North Carolina Central University

President of North Carolina Central University
- In office January 20, 1948, – September 1, 1963
- Preceded by: James E. Shepard
- Succeeded by: Samuel P. Massie

Personal details
- Born: February 26, 1898; U.S.
- Died: August 1974 (aged 76)
- Education: Columbia University

Alfonso Elder (February 26, 1898 – August 1974) was the second president of North Carolina Central University.

On January 20, 1948, Elder was elected President of North Carolina College at Durham. At the time of his election, Elder was serving as head of the Graduate Department of Education and had formerly been Dean of the College of Arts and Sciences. Elder was the president of North Carolina Central University during part of the civil rights movement. During this time, he helped supervise racial integration at the school. Elder retired September 1, 1963.

Preceded by James E. Shepard	President of North Carolina Central University; 1948–1963	Succeeded by Samuel P. Massie
