= Halifax County Schools (North Carolina) =

School district in North Carolina, United States

Location
- Halifax County, North Carolina United States

District information
- Type: Public
- Grades: PK–12
- Superintendent: Eric Cunningham
- Schools: 10
- Budget: $ 49,936,000
- NCES District ID: 3701950

Students and staff
- Students: 2,566
- Teachers: 262.83 (on FTE basis)
- Staff: 324.57 (on FTE basis)
- Student–teacher ratio: 15.52:1

Other information
- Website: www.halifax.k12.nc.us

Halifax County Schools is a PK–12 graded school district serving Halifax County, North Carolina. The district operates public schools serving communities in Halifax County.

== History ==
In 1969, the North Carolina General Assembly had authorized the town of Scotland Neck to form its own school district. The United States Justice Department filed a suit and the United States District Courts blocked the split later that year. The state and the new Scotland Neck school board appealed. Eventually the case was appealed to the United States Supreme Court in 1971. The Supreme Court ruled against the split in June, 1972.

A 2011 report by the University of North Carolina Center for Civil Rights found that segregation and inequality still exists in Halifax County because of the three separate city and county school systems. The Halifax County Schools system is run independently of the Roanoke Rapids Graded School District and Weldon City Schools. The county system had struggled for many years with funding and school performance issues. The report strongly suggested merging the systems. School performance issues gained media attention in 2011 when North Carolina's ABCs of Education report showed that 6 of the 13 lowest performing schools in the state belonged to the county school district.

== Student demographics ==
For the 2010–11 school year, Halifax County Schools had a total population of 4,079 students and 191.89 teachers on a (FTE) basis. This produced a student-teacher ratio of 15.52:1. That same year, out of the total student population, the gender ratio was 51% male to 49% female. The demographic group makeup was: Black, 87%; American Indian, 6%; White, 5%; Hispanic, 2%; and Asian/Pacific Islander, 0% (two or more races: 1%). For the same school year, 90.09% of the students received free and reduced-cost lunches.

As of 2013 it, along with Weldon City Schools, has a student body that is almost all of races other than non-Hispanic white, while the student body of Roanoke Rapids Graded School District is 70% white.

== Governance ==
The primary governing body of Halifax County Schools follows a council–manager government format with a seven-member Board of Education appointing a Superintendent to run the day-to-day operations of the system. The school system currently resides in the North Carolina State Board of Education's Third District.

=== Board of education ===
The seven members of the Board of Education generally meet on the first Monday of each month. The current members of the board are: Carolyn Hawkins, Claude Cooper (Chair), Joyce Lashley (Vice-Chair), Charles Hedgepeth, Tyus Few, James Davis III, and Susie Lynch-Evans.

=== Superintendent ===
The current Superintendent is Dr. Eric Cunningham. He was appointed in July 2016. He formally served at Nash County Schools as the Assistant Superintendent. The Superintendent of the system was Elease Frederick. She began in 2009 after Geraldine Middleton resigned. Frederick was born in Halifax County and attended school there. She later returned and worked for many years in the Halifax County Schools administration. Her most recent prior position was as associate superintendent for the system. Dr. Frederick retired in June 2016.

== Member schools ==
Halifax County Schools has 10 schools ranging from pre-kindergarten to twelfth grade. Those schools are separated into two high schools, two middle schools, and six elementary schools.

=== High schools ===
- Northwest Collegiate and Technical Academy (Littleton)
- Southeast Collegiate Prep Academy (Halifax)

=== Middle schools ===
- Enfield Middle STEAM Academy (Enfield)
- Eastman Leadership Academy
- William R. Davie Middle STEM Academy (Roanoke Rapids)

=== Elementary schools ===
- Aurelian Springs Institute of Global Learning (Littleton)
- Eastman Leadership Academy
- Everetts Elementary STEM Academy (Roanoke Rapids)
- Hollister Elementary Leadership Academy (Hollister)
- Inborden Elementary STEAM Academy (Enfield)
- Pittman Elementary Leadership Academy (Enfield)
- Scotland Neck Elementary Leadership Academy (Scotland Neck)

== Athletics ==
According to the North Carolina High School Athletic Association, for the 2018–2019 school year: Northwest Collegiate & Technical Academy and Southeast Collegiate Prep Academy are both 1A school in the Tar Roanoke Conference.

== See also ==
- List of school districts in North Carolina
