= Willie Gilchrist =

African American university president

Chancellor of Elizabeth City State University
- In office March 15, 2007 – June 30, 2013

Interim-Chancellor Elizabeth City State University
- In office September 2006 – March 15, 2007

Superintendent of Halifax County Schools (North Carolina)
- In office 1994–2006

Personal details
- Born: Willie James Gilchrist; June 30, 1950 (age 76) Rochester, New York, U.S.
- Education: Elizabeth City State University, B.S. 1973 Brockport State University, M.A. 1975; Virginia Tech, M.Ed. 1985 Nova Southeastern University, Ed.D 1998

Willie James Gilchrist (born June 30, 1950) is an African American academic administrator and educator. He was the chancellor of Elizabeth City State University and the superintendent of the Halifax County Schools in North Carolina.

== Early life ==
Gilchrist was born on June 30, 1950 in Rochester, New York, where he grew up. His parents were Essie Mae and Wille Lee Gilchrist. He had two sisters and two brothers.

Gilchrist graduated from Elizabeth City State University in 1973 with a bachelor's in health and physical education. He then attended Brockport State University, graduating with a master's in administration in 1975. Gilchrist also earned a advanced degree in administration from Virginia Tech in 1985. He received an Ed.D. in education administration and supervision from Nova Southeastern University in 1998.

== Career ==
After graduating from college in 1973, Gilchrist returned to Rochester, where he taught health and exceptional children in a public school, was a drug counselor, and a basketball coach. He returned to North Carolina in 1977 and taught at the Jackson-Eastside Elementary School in Northampton County, North Carolina. Over the next sixteen years, he was a public school classroom teacher, assistant principal, and principal for Northhamton County Schools, including being the princial of Northampton County High School – West. He became the associate superintendent for personnel of the Northampton County Schools in 1993.

Gilchrist was the superintendent of the Halifax County Schools in North Carolina from 1994 to 2006. When he joined the school system in 1994, only 27 percent of its students were working at grade level work; that number changed to 64 percent after eight years of his leaderhsip. While he was the superentendant in Halifx, Gilchrist served on North Carolina's More at Four Committee and as co-chairman of the Education First Task Force, at the request of Mike Easley, the Governor of North Carolina. He also served on the University of North Carolia Board of Governors.

Gilchrist served as the interim chancellor of Elizabeth City State University beginning in September 2006. He became chancellor of Elizabeth City State University in March 15, 2007. During his tenure, he oversaw reaccreditation with the Southern Association of Colleges and Schools, with no findings, and the construction of an Education Complex, Pharmacy Complex, and a residence hall. He resigned effective June 30, 2013. His resignation corresponded with a scandal involving the campus police’s handling of a sexual battery.

== Honors ==
In 1996, Gilchrist received the African American Cultural Complex Educator Award. In 2001, he was elected to the Educators Hall of Fame by East Carolina University College of Education.

The Willie and Jacqueline Gilchrist Education and Psychology Complex on the Elizabeth City State University campus was named in his honor.

== Personal life ==
Gilchrist's wife, Jacqueline, was from Northampton County, North Carolina, and was also a graduate of Elizabeth City State University. They have three children: Wyvondalyn, Steven, and Willie. They had a house located on two acres in Scotland Neck, North Carolina.

Gilchrist is a member of Phi Beta Sigma fraternity.
