= Johnson O. Akinleye =

Nigerian-American academic administrator

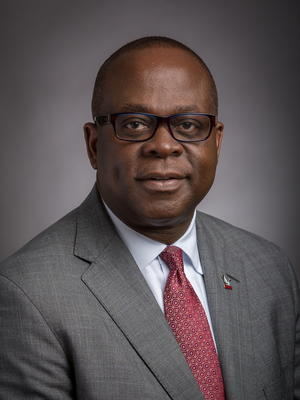

12th Chancellor of North Carolina Central University
- In office June 26, 2017 – June 30, 2024
- Preceded by: Debra Saunders-White
- Succeeded by: Karrie Dixon

Johnson O. Akinleye was the twelfth chancellor of North Carolina Central University. He was installed as chancellor of the university on June 26, 2017. He retired on June 30, 2024.

== Early life and education ==
Johnson O. Akinleye was born 1 of 22 children in Ile-Ife, Nigeria. He earned a bachelor's degree in telecommunications and a masters in media technology from Alabama A&M University and a doctorate in human communications studies from Howard University.

== Career ==
Akinleye began his career as an assistant professor in the Department of Communications at Bowie State University from 1986 to 1989. Prior to coming to NCCU, he held positions at Bethune-Cookman University, Edward Waters College, and the University of North Carolina Wilmington. Akinleye joined NCCU in 2014 as provost and vice chancellor for academic affairs. He served as acting chancellor of NCCU from August to December 2016, and as interim chancellor from December 2016 to June 2017, when he received a permanent appointment following the death of Debra Saunders-White. Dr. Akinleye is often noted for his leadership and developing his university into a high performing HBCU. He was a featured speaker on PBS. Dr. Johnson O. Akinleye was appointed to the NCAA Division I Presidential Forum.

== Personal life ==
Akinleye is married to Juanita Akinleye. They have two adult children (Nikki and Peter). Akinleye is a member of the Omega Psi Phi and Sigma Pi Phi fraternities.
