= WRVS-FM =

Coordinates: 36.282°N 76.212°W

- Elizabeth City, North Carolina; United States
- Broadcast area: ECSU/Elizabeth City/Northeastern North Carolina/Hampton Roads, VA
- Frequency: 89.9 MHz (HD Radio)
- Branding: "89-Nine ECSU"

Programming
- Format: Urban contemporary
- Subchannels: HD2: Jazz "Jazzy 88.9 HD2"
- Affiliations: Compass Media Networks; NPR

Ownership
- Owner: Elizabeth City State University

History
- First air date: 1986
- Call sign meaning: W R V S "Wonderful Radio Viking Style"

Technical information
- Licensing authority: FCC
- Facility ID: 19249
- Class: C2
- ERP: 41,000 watts
- HAAT: 70 meters (230 ft)

Links
- Public license information: Public file; LMS
- Webcast: Listen Live; Listen Live (HD2)
- Website: WRVS Online

WRVS-FM (89.9 MHz), "Eighty-Nine-Nine ECSU" or "WRVS Eighty-Nine-Nine", is an urban contemporary radio station run from Elizabeth City State University in Elizabeth City, North Carolina. The staff of the station mentors students of the university's Department of Language, Literature & Communication, as well as volunteers/students interested in broadcasting. It has 41 kilowatts (kW) power.

== History ==
The station originally began broadcasting on Tuesday March 18, 1986 with 10 kW at 90.7 MHz from a little white house-like building that currently houses other offices of the university. WRVS became Northeastern NC's first Public Radio Station. Edgard "Eddie" Oakley was the first student to broadcast on the station. Aerek Stephens the first student sports announcer. The station later moved to its current location in Williams Hall.

The original slogan for WRVS-FM was "Wonderful Radio Viking Style". WRVS-FM at one point used the slogan "The Rhythm of the River City" and currently uses the tagline "Your Community Voice".

The station was the brainchild of former Chancellor Jimmy Jenkins. He hired David C. Linton, from WSHA-FM at Shaw University to help the University realize his dream. Linton was brought in as Special Assistant to the Chancellor for Media Development. Linton, worked with the FCC, engineers and others to get the station on the air. Linton, who served as the stations first General Manager & Program Director also coined the slogan, as well as, the station call letters. The original staff consisted of Paula Sutton, Public Affairs Director, Andre Smith, Sports Director, Gospel announcer Dorothy Keith and a group of talented students. It was David Linton and Paula Sutton who shared the on-air debut honors by playing the song "Ain't No Stoppin' Us Now" by McFadden and Whitehead.

The station call letters stand for Wonderful Radio Viking Style. In 1990 the station received several upgrades, including a new transmitter allowing an effective radiated power of 41 kW (the old transmitter now serves as a backup transmitter) as well as a new frequency of 89.9 MHz.

On July 3, 1996 the station went dark for weeks due to water and smoke damage to equipment due to an electrical fire that occurred upstairs in Williams Hall. The station signed back on in October and later went to a Jazz-based format as "Jazzy 89-Nine".

In 2003, the station reverted to its original and current Urban/Urban AC based format, and began broadcasting 24 hours a day.

In the 1990s WRVS-FM was one of the best programmed student operated stations of its kind. WRVS-FM is Public Supported NPR Affiliated Radio Station. Its 280-foot (85 m) transmitter and studios are located on the campus of Elizabeth City State University. WRVS-FM is currently the only station in Elizabeth City that broadcasts in HD radio and is currently streaming online.

The station is credited for developing and starring such talents as the legendary Greg "Sampson" Lange, DJ Fountz, KD Bowe & Traci LaTrelle.
