= Ada Lovelace Award =

Award for women in computing, founded 1981

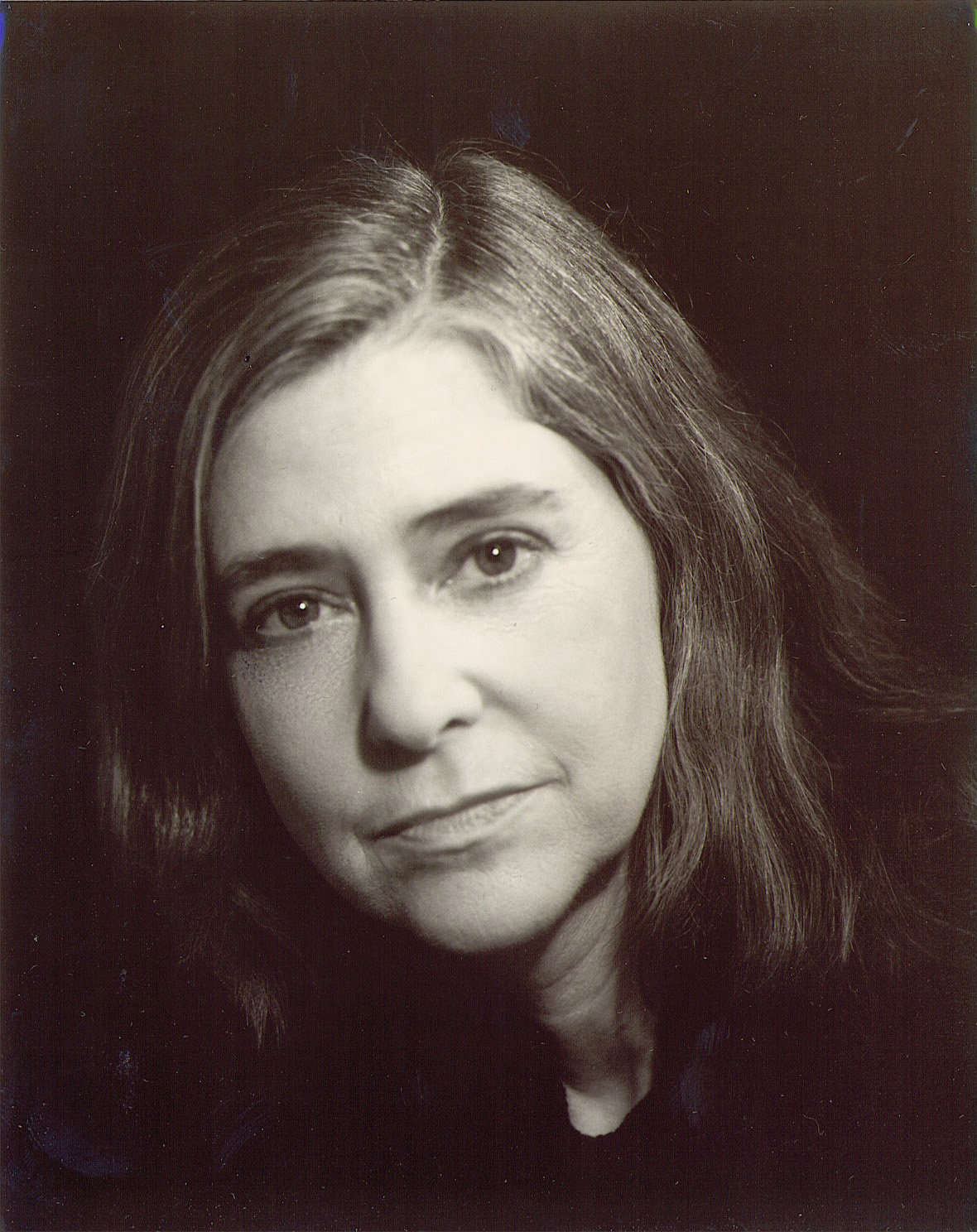
Margaret Hamilton, the 1986 winner of the Ada Lovelace Award.

The Ada Lovelace Award is given in honor of the English mathematician and computer programmer, Ada Lovelace, by the Association for Women in Computing. Founded in 1981, as the Service Award, which was given to Thelma Estrin, it was named the Augusta Ada Lovelace Award, the following year.

The award is given to individuals who have excelled in either of two areas: outstanding scientific/technical achievement and/or extraordinary service to the computing community through accomplishments and contributions on behalf of women in computing.

== Award winners ==
Year	Name	Reference
1982	Thelma Estrin	
1983	Grace Hopper	
1984	Ruth M. Davis	
1985	Amy D. Wohl	
1986	Margaret H. Hamilton	
1989	Jean E. Sammet	
1995	Anita Borg	
1997	Betty Holberton	
1998	Esther Dyson	
2000	Adele Mildred ("Milly") Koss	
2001	Dorothy E. Denning	
2002	Frances E. Allen	
2003	Carol Bartz	
2004	Anita K. Jones	
2005	C. Dianne Martin	

== See also ==
- Ada Byron Award
- BCS Lovelace Medal
