= Debra Saunders-White =

American academic (1957–2016)

11th Chancellor of North Carolina Central University
- In office June 1, 2013 – November 26, 2016
- Succeeded by: Johnson O. Akinleye

Debra Saunders-White (January 8, 1957 – November 26, 2016) was the eleventh chancellor of North Carolina Central University. She assumed office on June 1, 2013, and was the first woman to hold the permanent position of chancellor at NCCU. She was previously Deputy Assistant Secretary for Higher Education Programs at the U.S. Department of Education.

== Early life and education ==
Saunders-White was born in Hampton, Virginia. She earned a bachelor's degree in history from the University of Virginia in 1979 and a master of business administration from the College of William and Mary in 1993. Saunders-White received her doctorate in higher education administration from George Washington University in 2004.

== Career ==
Saunders-White worked at IBM from 1979 to 1994, first as a systems engineer and then in marketing. She taught college preparatory mathematics at St. George's School in Newport, RI from 1994 to 1998 and joined Hampton University in Hampton, VA as the assistant provost of technology in 1999. She built the university's first information technology organization, and in turn Hampton University was named one of the “most wired universities” by Forbes Magazine and the Princeton Review. In 2005, she was promoted as vice president for technology and chief information officer.

In 2006, Saunders-White left Hampton University to become the vice chancellor of Information Technology at the University of North Carolina Wilmington. During her time at UNCW, she also served in the Office of Institutional Diversity as the interim associate provost and the chief diversity officer.

In May 2011, Saunders-White began serving as deputy assistant secretary for higher education programs in the Department of Education. She left in 2013 after being appointed as the 11th chancellor of North Carolina Central University. NCCU is a public historically black university located in Durham, NC. Saunders-White began at NCCU on June 1, 2013, and was formally installed on Friday April 4, 2014. Saunders-White was a member of Alpha Kappa Alpha sorority.

Saunders-White died on November 26, 2016, from complications of kidney cancer at the age of 59.
