= John Henry Bias =

American education administrator

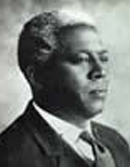
- Born: June 11, 1879; Palmyra, Missouri
- Died: July 15, 1939 (aged 60); Elizabeth City, North Carolina
- Spouse: Frances Lane Bias
- Parents: James W. Bias (father); Dinah Arnold Bias (mother)

Dr. John Henry Bias (June 11, 1879 – July 15, 1939) was cofounder and second president of Elizabeth City State University. He was a Missouri native who held many administrative educational roles. He is responsible for the four-year baccalaureate accreditation of Elizabeth City State University.

== Early life ==
John Henry Bias was born on June 11, 1879, in Palmyra, Missouri. His parents were James W. Bias, a Chicago, Burlington and Quincy Railroad employee, and Dinah Arnold Bias, a Kentucky native who moved to Missouri before the Civil war. Bias attended public school in Marion County, Missouri before attending Lincoln Institute in Jefferson City, Missouri. He graduated from the Lincoln Institute with a B.S.D and A.B. degree in 1901. He then attended the University of Chicago for two and a half years for post-graduate work.

== Career ==
Bias returned to the Lincoln Institute for the 1903–1904 school year to teach mathematics and drawing. In 1904, he became a professor of mathematics and science at Elizabeth City State Normal School where he remained until 1910. He left Elizabeth City State after his appointment as chair of the Natural Sciences department at Shaw University, where he taught for 10 years. In 1917, Bias was called to be the principal of the Berry O'Kelley Training School, one of the first rural high schools for African American students in North Carolina. It was located in Method, North Carolina, a small town near Raleigh. Bias returned to Elizabeth City State in 1923 as vice president. He was appointed president in 1928.

Bias was president during a period of economic and educational uncertainty. He embraced the importance of training students to make meaningful contributions in a free, Democratic society. He spearheaded the upgrade of the institution. In 1937, President Bias received approval from the State to officially implement a baccalaureate program. It was finalized in 1939 and the first four-year class, 26 students, graduated with Bachelor of Science in Elementary Education degrees.

== Legacy ==
Bias prided himself on his influence on progress of African Americans. He felt that when building rural civilization, no work was more rewarding than that of developing training schools. He inspired teachers with new ideals, taught students to remain on the soil that their parents owned, and encouraged living in rural areas instead of cities. Describing his philosophy of education, Bias said, "I am in favor of a type of education that leads to complete living which includes an education of the Head, Hand, and Heart."

Among many other changes, Bias added a baccalaureate program and spearheaded the institution's name change to Elizabeth City State Teachers College before it took on university status in 1969.

ECSU celebrates Bias and other founders annually. Donnice Brown, Bias' great-granddaughter, was the keynote speaker at the 123rd anniversary celebration in 2014.

== Personal life ==
Bias married Frances Lenora Lane, a Kansas native whom he met at Lincoln, on August 30, 1907. They had seven children together. He was buried in Elizabeth City, Pasquotank County, North Carolina.
