= James E. Shepard =

American pharmacist, civil servant and educator

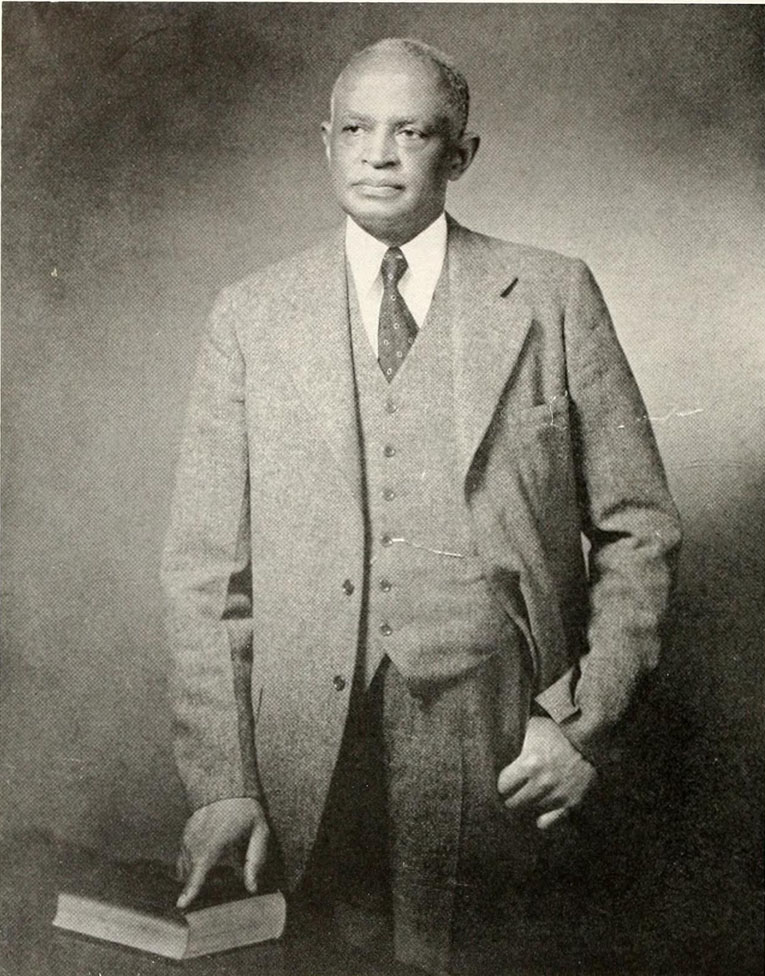
- Born: November 3, 1875; Raleigh, North Carolina, U.S.
- Died: October 6, 1947 (aged 71); Durham, North Carolina, U.S.
- Resting place: Beechwood Cemetery
- Occupations: pharmacist, school founder and college president
- Years active: 1910–1947
- Known for: North Carolina Central University
- Spouse: Annie Day Robinson

James Edward Shepard (November 3, 1875 – October 6, 1947) was an African American pharmacist, civil servant and educator, the founder of what became the North Carolina Central University in Durham, North Carolina. He first established it as a private school for religious training in 1910 but adapted it as a school for teachers. He had a network of private supporters, including northern white philanthropists such as Olivia Slocum Sage of New York.

He was the school's first president and remained its leader for nearly 40 years. By 1923, he secured state funding for it as a normal school, to continue the training of black teachers. After programs and classes were added to create a four-year curriculum, in 1925 it was renamed North Carolina College for Negroes, becoming the first liberal arts college in the nation for black students to be state-funded.

== Personal life and family ==
Shepard was born in Raleigh, North Carolina, the son of Rev. Augustus and Harriet Whitted Shepard. He received undergraduate and professional training at Shaw University, graduating in 1894.

The following year, he married Annie Day Robinson. They had three daughters: Marjorie A. Shepard (1896-1992) of Durham and Annie Day Shepard Smith (1899-1977) of New Bern, North Carolina and Marion (1902-1903). Smith had two daughters, Annie Day Smith Donaldson and Carolyn Marie Smith Green; both daughters had children, and Green has grandchildren.

== Career ==
Shepard settled in the Hayti District, becoming one of the founders of development. He worked as a pharmacist in the community, and later as a civil servant, and religious educator. He became president of the school he founded, one originally intended to train clergy.

== North Carolina Central University ==
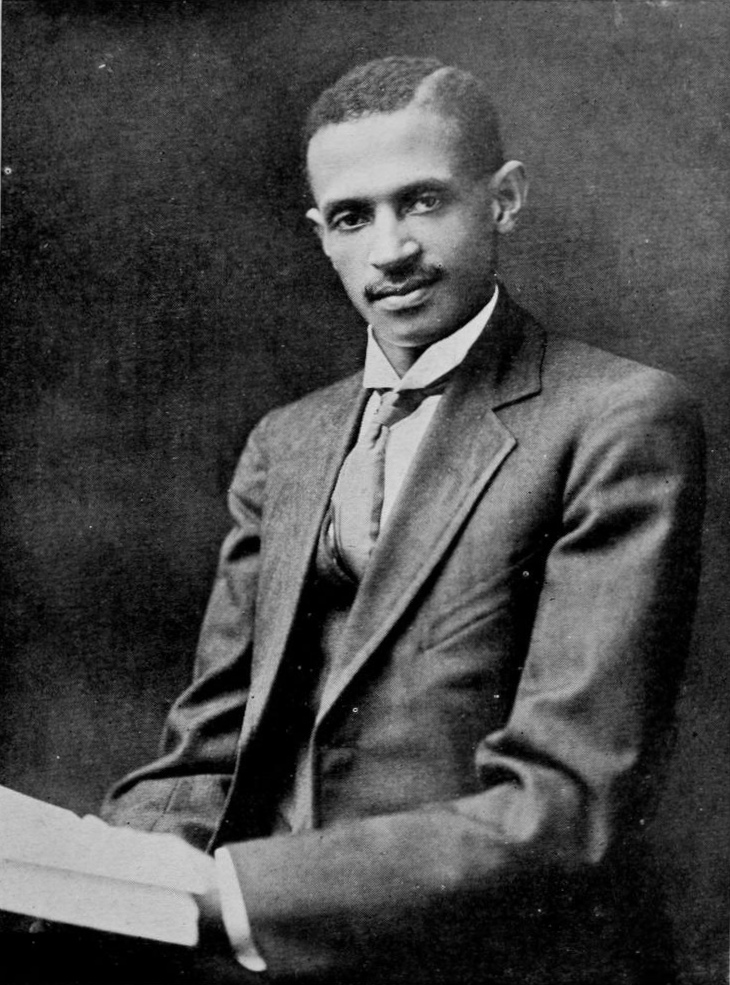
Shepard in the early twentieth century

Shepard founded the private National Religious Training School and Chautauqua in the Hayti District in 1910. Originally, this institution was conceived as a center for religious training. Later, he renamed it the National Training School; it was supported by the philanthropy of Shepard's numerous black and white friends in both the North and the South. These included Olivia Slocum Sage of New York.

The school provided professional development for black teachers of the Jim Crow era; education was considered a high calling in the black community in the drive for everyone to become literate. Teachers from the school taught in rural Durham County.

Shepard faced great difficulties in securing sufficient funding to keep the private school operating. He dealt with some of the issues of the Jim Crow era in his own way. At Christmas, white Durham merchants would bring selections of products to Shepard's office so that he could avoid "the possibility of dealing with rudeness downtown."

He continued to lobby the North Carolina General Assembly for support of the "North Carolina College for Negroes." When going to the legislature, Shepard traveled by car in order to avoid the train, which had segregated seating according to the Jim Crow rules.

When the North Carolina legislature approved state funding in 1923, the institution's name was changed to Durham State Normal School. In 1925, the program was expanded to a four-year curriculum, and the institution became North Carolina College for Negroes, the first state-supported liberal arts college for black people in North Carolina and in the United States. Its first four-year college class graduated in 1929.

In 1947, the name became North Carolina College at Durham. The 1969 General Assembly established the institution as one of the State's regional universities, and the name was changed to North Carolina Central University. Since 1972, NCCU has been a constituent institution of The University of North Carolina.

== Legacy and honors ==
- A middle school in Durham is named for him.
- Shepard was recognized as a Main Honoree by the Sesquicentennial Honors Commission at the Durham 150 Closing Ceremony in Durham, NC on November 2, 2019. The posthumous recognition was bestowed upon 29 individuals "whose dedication, accomplishments and passion have helped shape Durham in important ways."

Preceded by none	President of North Carolina Central University; 1910–1947	Succeeded by Alfonso Elder
