= Karrie G. Dixon =

American academic administrator

13th Chancellor of North Carolina Central University
- Incumbent
- Assumed office July 1, 2024
- Preceded by: Johnson O. Akinleye

7th Chancellor of Elizabeth City State University
- In office April 9, 2018 – June 30, 2024; Interim: April 9, 2018 - December 14, 2018
- Preceded by: Thomas Conway
- Succeeded by: Catherine Edmonds

Personal details
- Born: Karrie Gibson
- Children: 2
- Education: North Carolina State University (BA, EdD); University of North Carolina at Greensboro (MA)

Karrie Gibson Dixon is an American academic administrator serving as the thirteenth chancellor and chief executive officer of the North Carolina Central University since 2024. She was previously the Chancellor of Elizabeth City State University.

== Life ==
Dixon is from Winston-Salem, North Carolina. She is the daughter of Pamela and Aldine Gibson. In 1993, she graduated from Carver High School. Dixon completed a B.A. in communication with concentrations in public and interpersonal communication and public relations and a minor in English at North Carolina State University in 1997. In 2000, she earned a M.A. in speech communication with a concentration in communication theory and research from the University of North Carolina at Greensboro. She received a Ed.D. in adult and community college education from the North Carolina State University. Her 2003 dissertation was titled, Factors Associated with Academic and Social Integration of Freshman Students in the First Year College at North Carolina State University. Wynetta Lee was her doctoral advisor.

In 2008, Dixon became a senior administrator at the University of North Carolina (UNC). She served as the assistant vice provost at North Carolina State University and an adjunct assistant professor in its department of leadership, policy, adult, and higher education. In 2014, Dixon became its vice president for academic and student affairs. She was also the UNC chief student affairs officer. In April 2018, she became the interim chancellor of the Elizabeth City State University, succeeding Thomas Conway, Jr. In December 2018, she became its twelfth chief executive officer and seventh chancellor. Dixon is the second female to hold the position.

Dixon is married and has two daughters.
