= Milly Koss =

American computing pioneer

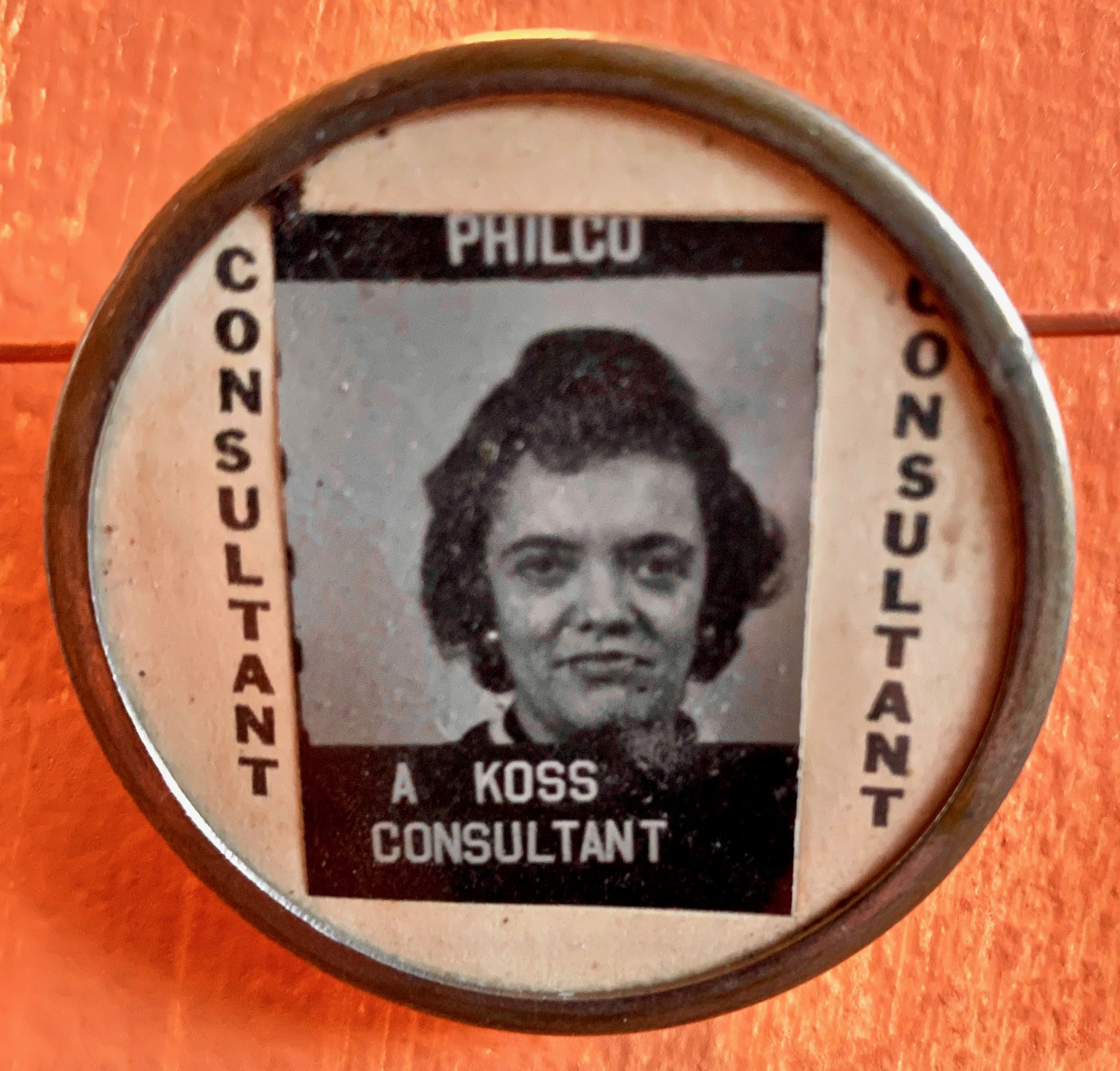
- Koss in the 1950s as a consultant to UNIVAC
- Born: Adele Goss; July 11, 1928; 97 years ago
- Died: September 11, 2012 (aged 84); Massachusetts
- Burial place: Sharon Memorial Park, Massachusetts
- Education: University of Pennsylvania
- Occupation: computer programmer
- Years active: 1950–1994
- Employer(s): Eckert–Mauchly Computer Corporation, Burroughs Corporation, Remington Rand, Philco, Control Data Corporation, Harvard University
- Known for: worked under Grace Hopper, programming UNIVAC I, Editing Generator, early text editing, early sorting programs, co-wrote first compiler
- Awards: Ada Lovelace Award, Grace Hopper Celebration of Women in Computing Pioneer Award

Adele Mildred Koss, known as Milly Koss (11 July 1928 – 11 September 2012) was an American pioneering computer programmer. The Association for Women in Computing awarded her an Ada Lovelace Award in 2000.

She attended Philadelphia High School for Girls and graduated in mathematics from University of Pennsylvania in 1950. Following her first job interview with an insurance company, Koss, who was engaged at the time, was rejected for the reason that married women would have children and leave.

She worked at Eckert–Mauchly Computer Corporation (EMCC) under Grace Hopper, programming the UNIVAC I. Her first big project was the development of what has become known as the 'Editing Generator', a sophisticated program to automatically format data for printing. Being able to create margins, headings and page numbers on the fly, Koss was the first programmer to attempt word processing. During her time at EMCC she also wrote some of the first sorting programs, and with Hopper worked on a link loader (at that time called a compiler). After working for several other companies including Burroughs Corporation, Remington Rand, Philco, and Control Data Corporation (CDC), Koss moved to Harvard University where she stayed for 27 years until she retired in 1994, having been Associate Director of the Office for Information Technology and the University's Information Security Officer. Her colleague Jean Bartik recalled that Koss had become pregnant and was expected to leave her post, but she approached Hopper with the idea of what is now known as telecommuting, and Hopper encouraged her to stay on and to work from home as necessary. She negotiated similar arrangements in several subsequent posts.

In 1997, she was awarded a Pioneer Award, one of seven women to be so honoured, at the Grace Hopper Celebration of Women in Computing.

Koss died on 11 September 2012, survived by three children and three grandchildren. Her husband Norman A. Koss had pre-deceased her: they had been married for 60 years.
