= Charlie Nelms =

Chancellor Charlie Nelms

Charlie Nelms is an educator and administrator who served as the fourth chancellor of University of Michigan-Flint in Flint, Michigan and tenth chancellor of North Carolina Central University in Durham, North Carolina. On July 26, 2012, after completing a five-year commitment to serve at the institution, Dr. Nelms announced his retirement, effective August 6, 2012. He currently is a contributing writer to The Huffington Post on educational issues and has founded Destination Graduation, a non-profit organization focused on increasing retention and graduation rates at the nation's historically black colleges and universities (HBCUs).

== Biography ==
Charlie Nelms, Ed.D., has more than 40 years of experience and leadership in higher education. Nelms served as chancellor of North Carolina Central University (NCCU) in Durham from 2007 to 2012. During his tenure, Nelms intensified the university's emphasis on student success, setting ambitious goals for increasing student retention and graduation rates. A few of his accomplishments included raising the standards for undergraduate admissions and progression; guiding the establishment of the first and only Ph.D. program to be offered at NCCU in 50 years; initiating and completing a comprehensive academic program review, which led to the merging or discontinuation of more than a dozen academic programs; transitioning from NCAA Division II to Division I and membership in the Mid-Eastern Athletic Conference; and creating the Division of Research and Economic Development which assisted the university in receiving the largest sponsored research grants in its history (more than $100 million flowing to NCCU researchers in five years). During his tenure, U.S. News & World Report ranked NCCU as one of the best public HBCUs in the country for three consecutive years.

In 2011, Nelms published "A Call to Action", a policy directive intended to spur a national dialogue concerning the revitalization of the historically black colleges and universities as an important sector of American higher education.

== Indiana University career ==
In 1978, Nelms began his on-again, off-again tenure within the Indiana University system with his appointment as assistant professor of education as well as Director of the University Division and Associate Dean for Student Services at Indiana University Northwest in Gary. Within the year, his administrative title and position changed to Associate Dean Academic Affairs. In 1984, he resigned to accept a position as Vice President for Student Services at Sinclair Community College in Dayton, Ohio, but returned to the Indiana University system in 1987 to serve as Chancellor of the Indiana University East campus, where he remained until 1994. He then left IU to lead the University of Michigan-Flint campus, which he felt was more diverse than Indiana University Bloomington and would allow him to go forward with his diversity initiatives.

The Indiana University alum was drawn back to Bloomington in 1998 to serve in his final IU position as the Vice President for Institutional Development and Student Affairs, as well as serving in the School of Education as Professor of Higher Education Administration. Major achievements attributed to his work during this period included the establishment of the Honors College (previously just a Division), implementation of the Mission Differentiation Project which focused on the missions of the 8 IU campuses, and system-wide work with university leaders to develop and initiate programs to aid in retention and graduation.

Nelms resigned in 2007 to assume the position of chancellor at North Carolina Central University.

== Personal ==
Nelms is married and has one son.

== Publications ==
- From Cotton Fields to University Leadership: All Eyes on Charlie, A Memoir:Well House Books, 2019
- Having My Say: Reflections of a Black Baby Boomer, 2018
