= Berg Science Seminars =

The Joe Berg Science Seminars began providing enrichment to high school students in the 1950s. It began as a challenge to encourage science and engineering students at the high school level through science projects and science fair competitions in response to the launch of Sputnik by the Soviet Union. At one time, there were more than 700 Joe Berg science seminar programs throughout North America. Now only two are known to exist: the Wachusett Regional High School Science Seminar in Holden, MA, founded in 1959, and the Jacksonville Joe Berg Seminars in Jacksonville, Florida, founded in 1960. The Jacksonville Joe Berg Seminars is part of the University of North Florida's Science and Culture Initiative. The Jacksonville program includes a humanities track, started in 1963, along with the sciences track, whereas the Massachusetts program more closely follows the original Joe Berg Foundation concept.

== Vancouver School Board ==
The Vancouver School Board stopped their program around 1971. Participation was determined by grade 9 and 10 taking a series of University Science Scholarship Examinations, with the top dozen from each grade being selected.
