= Albert N. Whiting =

American academic (1917–2020)

- Born: July 3, 1917; Navesink, New Jersey, U.S.
- Died: June 4, 2020 (aged 102); Columbia, Maryland, U.S.
- Occupations: Chancellor, North Carolina Central University
- Spouse: Lottie L. Whiting
- Children: 2

Academic background
- Education: American University
- Thesis: The United House of Prayer for All People: a case study of a charismatic sect (1952)

Academic work
- Discipline: Sociologist

Albert Nathaniel Whiting (July 3, 1917 – June 4, 2020) was an American academic who was President and Chancellor of North Carolina College (which became North Carolina Central University) from 1966 to 1983. He was born in Navesink, New Jersey in July 1917, and served in the U.S. armed forces during World War II. He received his PhD from the American University in 1952. Whiting served as Dean of the Faculty of Morgan State College before becoming president and Chancellor of North Carolina College. He was married to Lottie Luck, who predeceased him in 2004 at the age of 85.
