= Roanoke Rapids Graded School District =

School district in North Carolina, United States

Address
- 536 Hamilton Street Roanoke Rapids, North Carolina, 27870; United States

District information
- Type: Public
- Grades: PreK–13
- NCES District ID: 3703900

Students and staff
- Students: 2,675
- Teachers: 190.5
- Staff: 165.05
- Student–teacher ratio: 14.04

Other information
- Website: www.rrgsd.org

The Roanoke Rapids Graded School District (RRGSD) is a school district headquartered in Roanoke Rapids, North Carolina.

== History ==
Recognizing the serious need for additional educational opportunities in Roanoke Rapids, a group of residents petitioned the North Carolina General Assembly to grant a charter for a local school district, which was officially adopted on February 26, 1907. The following year, the board selected A. E. Akers as the first superintendent from a pool of 70 applicants. His salary was set at 1,000 dollars per year, and he was also responsible for teaching the sixth and seventh grades.

A major milestone occurred in 1920 when voters approved a bond issue to construct a new high school. The board commissioned Hobart Upjohn, who was a renowned architect from New York, to design a premier facility for the area. Although the building was not fully complete at the time, the class of 1921 held their graduation ceremony in the new space. The high school officially opened on September 16, 1921. This facility features a classic Elizabethan architectural style and remains a significant landmark in both the city and the broader northeastern North Carolina region.The campus expanded in 1924 with the completion of a junior building. Over the next decade, the district continued to grow to meet the needs of the rising population.

In 1935, the district opened Clara Hearne School at Eighth and Cedar Streets. The district subsequently operated W. L. Medlin School on Vance Street and William L. Manning School on Barrett Street as separate elementary schools. Federal education records identify W. L. Medlin School at 200 Vance Street and William L. Manning School at 1102 Barrett Street. Medlin continued operating as an elementary school into the late twentieth century.

Leadership within the district evolved over the following decades. In 1995, the board made history by hiring Jane B. Burke as the first female superintendent. More recently, in 2016, the board hired Dr. Dain Butler, who implemented a new mission and a comprehensive strategic plan in 2017. In January 2018, the Board of Trustees and the Halifax County Commissioners celebrated the opening of a new replacement Manning Elementary School. Julie Thompson served as superintendent from 2022 until her resignation in early 2026. Following her departure, the board appointed Tom Davis to serve as acting superintendent, followed by the appointment of Dr. Tom Daly as interim superintendent in January 2026, while the district initiated a search for a permanent successor.

Under the guidance of recent administrations, the district launched the Roanoke Rapids Early College High School in August 2018. This program operates in partnership with Halifax Community College to allow students to earn college credits and prepare for their future careers by blending high school coursework with two years of higher education.

In recent years, the district has focused on the "Vision 2035" strategic plan to foster academic excellence and workforce preparedness. As of 2025, the district achieved significant academic growth, with several schools improving their performance grades and exiting low-performing status. Looking toward the future, the district is actively pursuing state funding to construct a new middle school, a project designed to modernize learning environments and allow for the strategic consolidation of other district programs.

== Demographics ==
Demographic data for the district has shifted over time. In 2013, the student body was 70% white, while neighboring districts like the Halifax County School District and the Weldon City Schools maintained populations that were almost entirely composed of students from other racial backgrounds. By 2017, the demographics in the district reached 66% white, 21% black, 8% Hispanic, and 5% other students. According to records from 2018, the makeup shifted to 59% white, 27% black, 8% Hispanic, and 6% other.

== Schools ==
- Akers Center for Educational Success
- Roanoke Rapids High School
- Roanoke Rapids Early College High School
- Chaloner Middle School
- Belmont Elementary School
- Manning Elementary School
- W. L. Medlin
- Clara Hearne Pre-K Center
