= Elizabeth City State University =

Public college in Elizabeth City, North Carolina, US

- Former names: State Colored Normal School at Elizabeth City (1891–1937); Elizabeth City State Teachers College (1937–1961); Elizabeth City State College (1961–1969)
- Motto: "To Live is to Learn"
- Type: Public historically black university
- Established: March 3, 1891; 135 years ago
- Parent institution: University of North Carolina
- Accreditation: SACS
- Academic affiliations: TMCF
- Endowment: $16.7 million (2021)
- Chancellor: S. Keith Hargrove
- Students: 2,149
- Undergraduates: 2,033
- Postgraduates: 116
- Location: Elizabeth City, North Carolina, United States; 36.28120°N 76.21512°W
- Campus: 200 acres (0.81 km^{2}); Distant town
- Colors: Royal blue and white
- Nickname: Vikings
- Sporting affiliations: NCAA Division II – CIAA
- Mascot: Vik the Viking
- Website: www.ecsu.edu
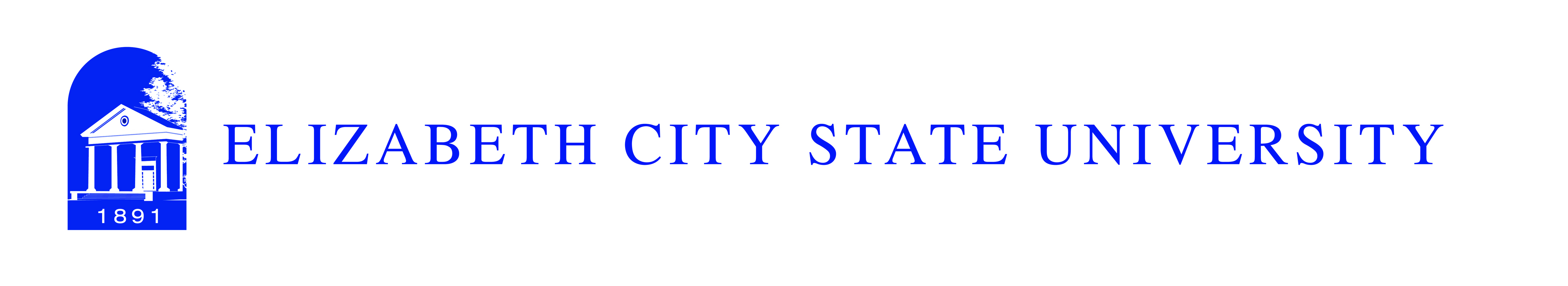

Elizabeth City State University (ECSU) is a public historically Black university in Elizabeth City, North Carolina, United States. It enrolls nearly 2,500 students in 28 undergraduate programs and four graduate programs. It is a member-school of the Thurgood Marshall College Fund and the University of North Carolina system.

== History ==
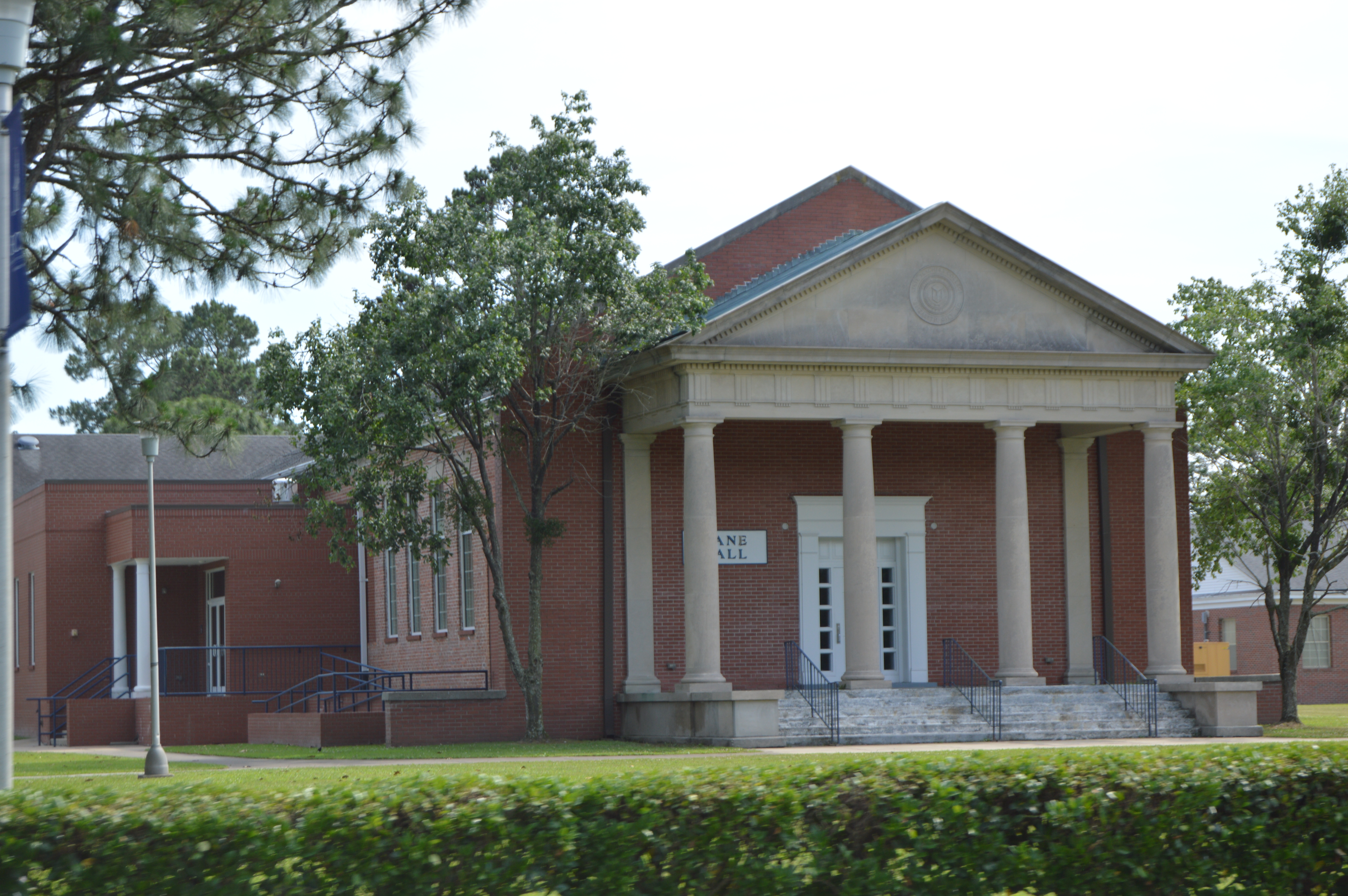
Lane Hall (1909), the oldest campus building

Elizabeth City State University was established by the North Carolina General Assembly on March 3, 1891, as the State Colored Normal School at Elizabeth City, in response to a bill calling for the creation of a two-year Normal School for the "teaching and training [of] teachers of the colored race to teach in the common schools of North Carolina." Peter Weddick Moore was its first leader. The school provided training for teachers of primary grades.

The campus quadrangle and six surrounding buildings are included in the Elizabeth City State Teachers College Historic District, listed on the National Register of Historic Places in 1994.

In 1937, the school made the transformation into a full four-year teachers college and was officially named Elizabeth City State Teachers College, while expanding its role to include the training of principals as well. In 1939, the college awarded its first bachelor of science degrees in its program of elementary education. Within the following twenty-five years, the college expanded its offerings to include a vocational-technical program and a total of thirteen academic majors.

In December 1961, the college gained membership in the Southern Association of Colleges and Schools. In 1963 its name was changed to Elizabeth City State College. In 1969, its name was changed to Elizabeth City State University to reflect expansion and the addition of graduate programs. When the University of North Carolina System was formed in 1972, ECSU became one of the system's sixteen constituent universities and entered into its current phase of development and organization. ECSU is home to the only four-year aviation science degree program in North Carolina.

In 2020, Elizabeth City State received $15 million from MacKenzie Scott. In 2026, Scott donated an additional $42 million which is the largest donation in the university's history.

=== 2025 shooting ===
On April 27, 2025, a shooter opened fire on campus during a school event. One person was killed and six others were injured, including three students.

=== List of chief executive officers ===
- Peter Weddick Moore, principal, 1891–1928, president emeritus, 1928–1934
- John Henry Bias, president, 1928–1939
- Harold Leonard Trigg, president, 1939–1945
- Sidney David Williams, president, 1946–1958, president emeritus, 1969–1974
- Walter Nathaniel Ridley, president, 1958–1968, president emeritus, 1988–1996
- Marion Dennis Thorpe, president, 1968–1972, chancellor, 1972–1983
- Jimmy Raymond Jenkins, chancellor, 1983–1995, chancellor emeritus, 1995–present
- Mickey Lynn Burnim, chancellor, 1995–2006
- Willie Gilchrist, chancellor, 2006–2013
- Charles L. Becton, interim chancellor, 2013–2014
- Stacey Franklin Jones, chancellor, 2014–2015
- Thomas Conway, interim chancellor, January 1, 2016 – 2018
- Karrie Gibson Dixon, chancellor, 2018–2024
- Catherine Edmonds, interim chancellor, July 1, 2024 – present

== Campus ==
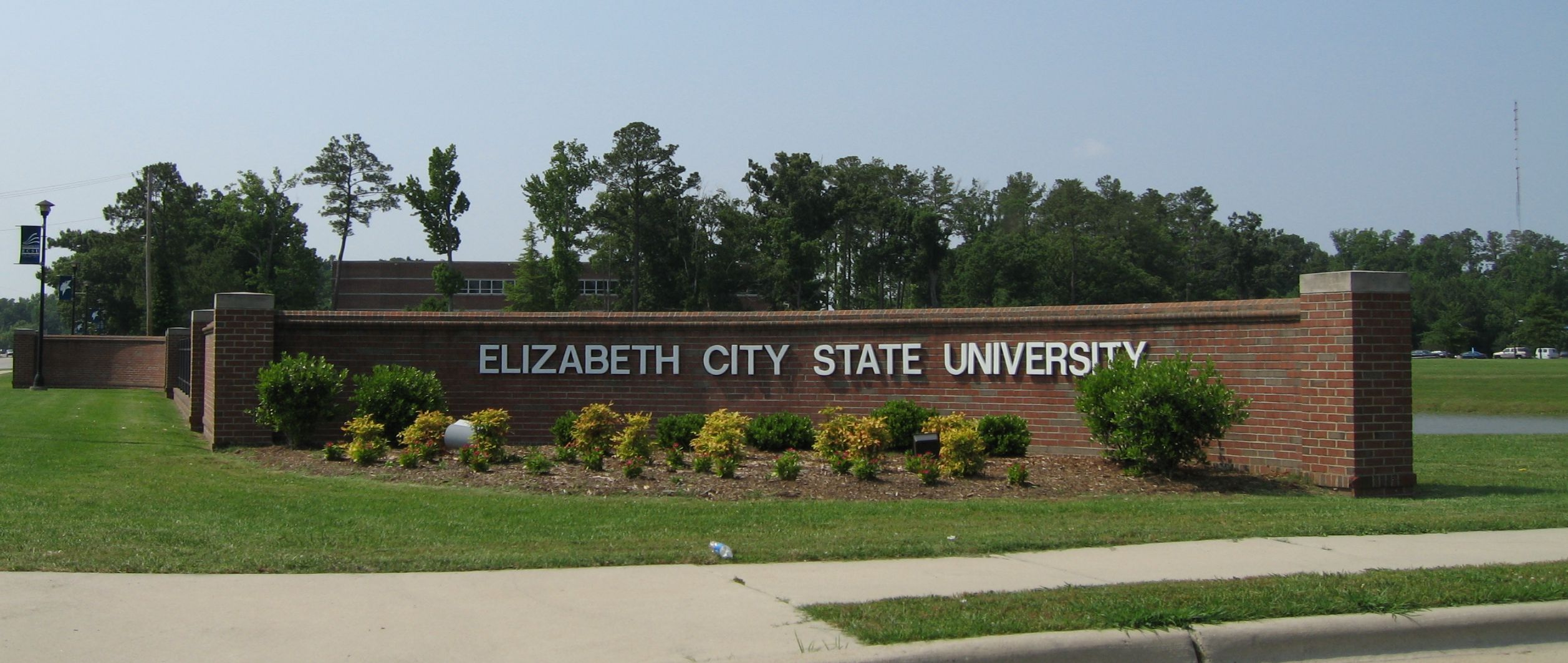

ECSU's campus encompasses 200 acres (0.81 km^{2}), mostly flanked by residential districts. This also includes the Elizabeth City State Teachers College District. This includes the campus quadrangle, Principal's House, Moore Hall G. R. Little Library (now H. L. Trigg Building), Bias Hall, Butler Hall, and Practice School Building. This was listed in the register in 1994.

== Academics ==
ECSU offers 28 baccalaureate degrees and four master's degrees in the following academic departments:

- Aviation and Emergency Management
- Business, Accounting and Sport Management
- Education
- English and Digital Media
- Health and Human Studies
- Mathematics, Computer Science and Engineering Technology
- Military Science
- Music and Visual Arts
- Natural Sciences
- Social Sciences

ECSU also offers special programs that appeal to various interests and fields of study, including the honors program (for high-achieving undergraduates), military science, and study abroad.

== Student life ==
Undergraduate demographics as of Fall 2023
Race and ethnicity	Total
Black	68%
White	17%
Two or more races	6%
Hispanic	5%
American Indian/Alaska Native	1%
Asian	1%
International student	1%
Unknown	1%
Economic diversity
Low-income (Note: The percentage of students who received an income-based federal Pell grant intended for low-income students.)	58%
Affluent (Note: The percentage of students who are a part of the American middle class at the bare minimum.)	42%

Students can join on-campus organizations including fraternities, sororities, the radio station WRVS-FM, the campus TV station, and intramural sports. Students may join the Student Government Association to help make campus life more interesting. Students may apply to Vikings Assisting New Students to lead the New Student Orientation and answer any questions parents or students may have about the school and campus life.

=== Athletics ===
As a member of the National Collegiate Athletic Association, ECSU's athletes, known athletically as the Vikings, compete in the Division II athletic conference known as the Central Intercollegiate Athletic Association (CIAA).

== Notable alumni ==
Name	Class year	Notability	Reference(s)
Stanley Bryant		Professional football player	
Tim Cofield	1985	Professional football player	
Bobby Futrell	1985	Professional football player	
Mike Gale	1970	Professional basketball player	
Willie Gilchrist	1973	Chancellor of Elizabeth City State University	
Anthony Hilliard	2009	Professional basketball player	
Larry Johnson, Sr.	1973	Professional football player and college and high school football coach	
Reggie Langhorne	1984	Professional football player	
Everett McIver	1993	Professional football player	
Jethro Pugh	1964	Former NFL defensive tackle	
Omari Salisbury		Journalist and videographer	
Johnnie Walton	1975	Professional football player	
Kenny Williams		Professional basketball player	
