= National Register of Historic Places listings in Pasquotank County, North Carolina =

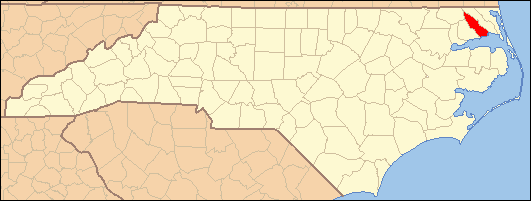

This list includes properties and districts listed on the National Register of Historic Places in Pasquotank County, North Carolina. Click the "Map of all coordinates" link to the right to view an online map of all properties and districts with latitude and longitude coordinates in the table below.

== Current listings ==
This National Park Service list is complete through NPS recent listings posted August 8, 2025.

	Name on the Register	Image	Date listed	Location	City or town	Description
1	Elizabeth City Cotton Mills		August 6, 2024 (#100010666)	451 North Hughes Boulevard; 36°18′31″N 76°13′43″W	Elizabeth City	
2	Elizabeth City Historic District	Elizabeth City Historic District	October 18, 1977 (#77001007)	Irregular pattern along Main St.; also roughly bounded by W. Church, W. Ehringhaus, Elliott, Cedar, and Ashe Sts.; also roughly along Selden between West Main and West Church Sts.; roughly bounded by North Elliot, Elizabeth, Poindexter, McMorrine, Church, Pool, and Grice Sts.; and roughly bounded by Poindexter, Grice, McMorrine, and Fearing Sts., and 302 Colonial Ave. 36°17′59″N 76°13′24″W	Elizabeth City	Second and third sets of boundaries represent boundary increases of March 7, 1994 and December 22, 2021.
3	Elizabeth City Industrial Historic District		April 30, 2021 (#100006461)	Roughly bounded by East Burgess, North Poindexter, and East Elizabeth Sts., and the Pasquotank R. 36°18′08″N 76°13′05″W	Elizabeth City	
4	Elizabeth City State Teachers College Historic District	Elizabeth City State Teachers College Historic District	February 28, 1994 (#94000083)	Roughly bounded by Parkview and Hollowell Drives; 36°17′01″N 76°12′46″W	Elizabeth City	
5	Elizabeth City Water Plant	Elizabeth City Water Plant	March 4, 1994 (#94000082)	Northern end of Wilson St., 100 block 36°18′46″N 76°13′30″W	Elizabeth City	
6	Episcopal Cemetery	Episcopal Cemetery	April 21, 1994 (#94000386)	505 E. Ehringhaus St. 36°17′46″N 76°13′14″W	Elizabeth City	
7	Morgan House	Morgan House	February 1, 1972 (#72000984)	South of South Mills off U.S. Route 17; 36°24′49″N 76°20′14″W	South Mills	
8	Newland Road Site	Newland Road Site	April 14, 1983 (#83001901)	U.S. Route 17; 36°22′19″N 76°17′38″W	Morgan's Corner	
9	Norfolk Southern Passenger Station	Norfolk Southern Passenger Station	February 25, 1994 (#94000080)	109 S. Hughes Boulevard; 36°18′10″N 76°14′19″W	Elizabeth City	
10	Northside Historic District	Northside Historic District	March 4, 1994 (#94000081)	Vicinity of North Rd. and N. Poindexter, Broad, and Pearl Sts. 36°18′23″N 76°13′15″W	Elizabeth City	
11	Oak Grove Cemetery		August 11, 2025 (#100012090)	1400 Peartree Road; 36°17′04″N 76°13′25″W	Elizabeth City	
12	Old Brick House	Old Brick House	March 16, 1972 (#72000983)	182 Brick House Lane; 36°20′00″N 76°13′16″W	Elizabeth City	
13	Riverside Historic District	Riverside Historic District	March 11, 1994 (#94000165)	Roughly, along Riverside Ave. from Morgan St. to Rivershore Rd. and Raleigh St. from Fairfax Ave. to Riverside; 36°17′42″N 76°12′40″W	Elizabeth City	
14	Shepard Street-South Road Street Historic District	Shepard Street-South Road Street Historic District	March 11, 1994 (#94000164)	Roughly bounded by Ehringhaus and Edge Sts., Brooks and Boston Aves. and Charles Cr. 36°17′40″N 76°13′19″W	Elizabeth City	

== See also ==
- National Register of Historic Places listings in North Carolina
- List of National Historic Landmarks in North Carolina
