= Coast Guard Base Elizabeth City =

Installation of the United States Coast Guard

Base Elizabeth City
- Elizabeth City, North Carolina in United States
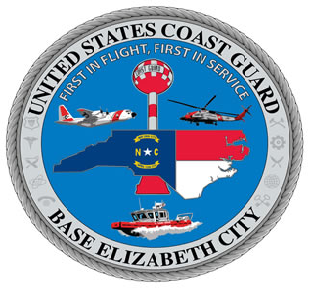
- Base Seal

Site information
- Type: Coast guard shore installation
- Owner: United States Coast Guard
- Website: Official website

Location
- Coordinates: 36°15′27″N 76°11′00″W
- Area: 822 Acres (333 ha)

Coast Guard Base Elizabeth City (officially known as Base Elizabeth City) is a major shore installation of the United States Coast Guard located in Elizabeth City, North Carolina. The base spans 822 acres (333 ha) and hosts multiple Coast Guard commands, including Coast Guard Air Station Elizabeth City, a joint-use airfield with the Elizabeth City Regional Airport. It plays a significant role as the largest employer in northeastern North Carolina and serves as the center of Coast Guard aviation nationwide.

== History ==
Base Elizabeth City was established in 1939 with the purchase of the property and commencement of site construction. Operational missions officially began with the commissioning of Air Station Elizabeth City in August 1940. During World War II, the installation experienced significant growth to support Navy and Army needs. Following the war, facilities constructed for the war effort were repurposed to establish an aircraft repair and supply center. This unit, currently named the Aviation Logistics Center (ALC), was commissioned in 1947. In 1949, the aircraft repair and supply center commenced providing select aviation enlisted force training. In 1978, the Aviation Technical Training Center (ATTC) was commissioned to consolidate and oversee all aviation enlisted personnel training nationwide.

== Commands ==
Coast Guard Base Elizabeth City serves as a host for several key Coast Guard commands, providing shared resources and infrastructure:

- Coast Guard Base Elizabeth City – This unit provides comprehensive mission support services to other Coast Guard units in Elizabeth City and throughout North Carolina. These services include medical and dental support, electronic systems support, purchasing and contracting, finance and property management, personnel administration, fire and emergency support, environmental compliance, and facilities maintenance.
- Air Station Elizabeth City – An operational unit providing aviation support for Coast Guard missions throughout the East Coast of the United States. It operates Lockheed HC-130 (HC-130J) and Sikorsky MH-60 Jayhawk (MH-60) aircraft.
- Aviation Logistics Center – A mission support unit serving as the Coast Guard's central hub for all aviation support nationwide. It provides depot maintenance, engineering, supply, and information technology services to all operational Coast Guard aircraft.
- Aviation Technical Training Center – A mission support unit that provides technical training for all Coast Guard aviation enlisted personnel nationwide.
- Aviation Projects Acquisition Center – A mission support unit that provides acquisition services for all Coast Guard aviation assets nationwide.
- Station Elizabeth City – An operational unit that provides small boat support for Coast Guard missions throughout Albemarle Sound.
- National Strike Force Coordination Center – Provides oversight and direction to Coast Guard strike teams to enhance contingency response operations, particularly for environmental and hazardous material responses.

== Community Connections ==
The Coast Guard has a longstanding relationship with the surrounding community of Elizabeth City. Elizabeth City was designated the 20th official Coast Guard City by Congress in 2015. In 2024, Elizabeth City and the Coast Guard Base were recognized as one of three Great American Defense Communities nationwide by the Association of Defense Communities. Since its inception in 2021, Base Elizabeth City has hosted the Coast Guard Marathon. The Base is the largest employer in northeastern North Carolina and the Coast Guard's presence contributes an estimated $500 million annual economic impact to the region.
