= Elizabeth station =

Elizabeth station may refer to:

- Elizabeth railway station, Adelaide, a commuter rail station in Adelaide, South Australia
- Elizabeth station (Central Railroad of New Jersey), a disused railway station in Elizabeth, New Jersey
- Elizabeth station (Illinois), a historic railway station in Elizabeth, Illinois
- Elizabeth station (NJ Transit), a commuter rail station in Elizabeth, New Jersey

Similarly named stations:

- Elizabeth & Hawthorne station, a streetcar stop in Charlotte, North Carolina
- Elizabeth City station, a historic railway station in Elizabeth City, North Carolina
- Elisabeth metro station, a rapid transit station in Brussels, Belgium
- Elizabeth Quay bus station, a bus terminal in Perth, Western Australia
- Elizabeth Quay railway station, a railway station in Perth, Western Australia
- Elizabeth South railway station, commuter rail station in suburban Adelaide, Australia
- North Elizabeth station, a commuter rail station in Elizabeth, New Jersey
- Port Elizabeth railway station, a railway station in Gqeberha, South Africa

== Other ==
- Air Force Station Port Elizabeth, a South African Air Force facility in Port Elizabeth, Eastern Cape Province, South Africa
- Coast Guard Air Station Elizabeth City, a USCG facility in Elizabeth City, North Carolina
- Mount Elizabeth Station, a cattle station in Western Australia
- Queen Elizabeth Power Station, a natural gas generating station in Saskatoon, Saskatchewan, Canada

== See also ==
- Elizabeth (disambiguation)
