= List of killings by law enforcement officers in the United States, December 2010 =

This is a list of people reported killed by non-military law enforcement officers in the United States in December 2010, whether in the line of duty or not, and regardless of reason or method. The listing documents the occurrence of a death, making no implications regarding wrongdoing or justification on the part of the person killed or officer involved. Killings are arranged by date of the incident that caused death. Different death dates, if known, are noted in the description. The table below lists 33 people.

== December 2010 ==
Date	Name (Age) of Deceased	Race	State (city)	Description
2010-12-31	Darryl Moore (52)		Pennsylvania (Philadelphia)	Officers tried to stop a green van driven by Moore after he ran a red light. Moore led the officers on a chase for four or five blocks, in and out of narrow streets, before getting stuck on ice. As officers approached Moore's car, Moore fired gunshots out of his driver's side window and struck one of the officers. In return, officers opened fire on the vehicle, killing Moore. Two weeks prior, Moore shot a security guard and robbed a gas station.
2010-12-30	John Timothy McCully (24)		Florida (Pembroke Pines)	A family member called 911 to report McCully as "needing medical attention for a mental disorder". He complied with police orders but did not agree with being baker acted after two officers attempted to shoot him with stun guns but missed. An officer then fatally shot McCully in the side as he fled, attempting to escape through the back door. Allegedly claiming McCully had a "large kitchen knife," also claiming it was allegedly necessary to defend his own life. However, it was later confirmed McCully was unarmed nor belligerent. First hand accounts discovered officers gave false testimonies and placed a kitchen knife at the scene in order to protect themselves. An officer involved in the events died due to undetermined circumstances in 2017.
2010-12-30	Reggie Darnell Preston (32)		Arkansas (North Little Rock)	Police say the man indicated he was suicidal and pulled a gun on the two officers. Police say they fired an unknown number of times, killing Preston.
2010-12-29	David Dwayne Butler (26)		Texas (Houston)	Two Houston Police Department officers were on patrol when they observed Butler riding a bicycle in the 3800 block of Jensen Drive. Butler was riding his bicycle on wrong side of the road without a headlamp. When officers began to question Butler, he started to reach into his pants pockets. The officers gave Butler verbal commands to not reach into his pockets, which he ignored. Butler then reached into his pants and pulled out a revolver and turned it toward one of the officers. One officer discharged his weapon, fatally striking Butler.
2010-12-27	Mark Yoachum (20)		Florida (Jacksonville)	
2010-12-25	Keven Wooten (23)	Black	California (Los Angeles)	LAPD officers were called regarding an assault with a rifle. When police arrived they saw Wooten riding toward them on a bicycle. He was holding a rifle and ignored their commands, prompting them to shoot, police said. Police say an assault rifle was recovered at the scene.
2010-12-25	Ephraim Williams (24)		California (San Bernardino)	According to authorities: Officers were dispatched on a report of a man with a gun. Officer Loera saw Williams, who matched the description given by callers, and Williams ran away. As Loera chased him he saw Williams reach into his waistband, looking back at Loera as he ran. Loera fired his gun but thought he had missed. Soon after it appeared that Williams tripped. After he had fallen, he continued reaching into his waistband and looking toward the direction where Loera was, "as if trying to find the officer as a target." Williams was pronounced dead at the scene. Later, the coroner found a loaded gun in Williams' pants.
2010-12-25	Daniel Pogue (54)		Utah (South Jordan)	Shot after ignoring order to stop running, threatening bystanders, and drop his weapon. Pogue was armed with "two shotguns, a rifle, several swords, and a machete."
2010-12-23	Maurice Pierce		Austin, Texas	Police officer Frank Wilson and his rookie partner, Bradley Smith, conducted a traffic stop on a vehicle driven by Maurice Pierce, a former suspect in the 1991 Austin yogurt shop murders, in the northern part of the city. After a brief foot pursuit, Pierce struggled with Wilson before removing a knife from his belt and stabbing Wilson in the neck. Wilson, who survived his injuries, subsequently pulled out his gun and shot and killed Pierce.
2010-12-20	Dawud Culver (16)		New Jersey (Newark)	An off-duty Newark police officer shot and killed a teenager who allegedly tried to rob the officer at gunpoint about 4:45 p.m. The officer opened fire and struck Culver once in the chest, the teen fled and dropped his weapon at the scene. Culver was found shortly afterward in East Orange General Hospital and was transferred to University Hospital in Newark, where he was pronounced dead.
2010-12-20	Obataiye Edwards (19)		California (Oakland)	Oakland Police Department received information that gang members planned to commit a shooting. They also learned that a 1990 maroon Lincoln would be used, and that the occupants of the car were armed. The same car was linked to an incident where shots were fired into a house. Undercover officers spotted the Lincoln in West Oakland. The vehicle failed to stop for police and a pursuit began. The Lincoln crashed into the corner of a house and the four occupants jumped out and ran. Two officers pursued Edwards down a walkway between two houses. Edwards stopped and pulled a semi-automatic pistol. They said he pointed it at them before they both opened fire with their pistols, hitting him numerous times. He was pronounced dead at the scene. Police said the pistol Edwards had was loaded, as was an SKS assault rifle found in the Lincoln.
2010-12-20	Dionne Brown (29)		Wisconsin (Milwaukee)	According to authorities, a woman who had been beaten by Brown called police. Brown was also wanted for violating his probation after being convicted of being a felon in possession of a gun. Two officers who arrived at the home were told Brown was hiding in a small crawlspace in the attic. "Officers repeatedly ordered the suspect to show his hands and to come out of the space," a department news release says. "He refused and instead turned to them, making a motion toward his waistband and lunged at them." The officers shot Brown, who died at the scene. Brown did not have a gun, but police found a knife at the scene.
2010-12-20	Yahree Cavin (23)		Indiana (Fort Wayne)	Fort Wayne Police arrived on Dec. 20, 2010, at Cavin's apartment where they found Cavin in possession of what appeared to be a handgun. One officer tased Cavin and another officer shot and killed Cavin when he refused to put down the gun, which turned out to be a toy handgun.
2010-12-20	Christopher Knight (35)		Georgia (Brunswick)	Died after being shocked with a Taser. Knight was being arrested for having rammed his car into another vehicle. Police used a Taser on Knight for resisting arrest, after which he rolled over and stopped breathing.
2010-12-19	Jose Olguin Cabanas (41)	Latino	California (Long Beach)	Police were flagged down by a woman regarding a sexual assault involving a minor who was related to a 41-year-old suspect, police said. After conducting interviews, officers determined a crime had occurred and went to a home to find the suspect, authorities said. "As officers contacted the suspect inside a residence, the suspect produced a handgun and an officer-involved shooting occurred," said a Long Beach Police Sgt.
2010-12-18	Jose Lucero		California (Rosamond)	Jose Lucero, who was mentally ill and a recovering drug addict, had relapsed and called 911 several times. Deputies from the Kern County Sheriff's Department responded to the home where he lived with his parents and decided to take him into custody. The deputies used pepper spray, tasers, and batons in their attempt to subdue Lucero. Deputies were finally able to get Lucero into handcuffs and transferred him to an ambulance outside the home. His respiration and pulse dropped. Paramedics could not prevent him from dying a few minutes later. In December 2012 Lucero's parents won a lawsuit against Kern County, the Sheriffs Department, and three deputies.
2010-12-17	Darryel Dwayne Ferguson (45)		Oregon (Portland)	Officers arrived and went to the apartment door to make contact with the suspect. Within seconds, the officers broadcast that shots had been fired and that the suspect had pointed a gun at the officers. The shooting happened at the threshold of the apartment door.
2010-12-17	Brandon Foster (22)		Florida (Miami)	Shot by police after failing to drop gun. Witnesses say that it was possible that Foster was attempting to pull up his pants. His family says that he was on his way to sell his rifle.
2010-12-16	Sarah Gauvin (30)		Florida (Stuart)	
2010-12-16	Ciara Lee (20)		Texas (Houston)	Lee and an accomplice robbed a man of his wallet, cell phone & laptop outside of his apartment in Southwest Houston. After being robbed the man followed Lee and the accomplice's vehicle to an apartment complex at 9802 Forum Park Drive and call 9-1-1. The responding officer began to investigate and approached Lee and her accomplice in their vehicle. When the officer attempted to detain them the male accomplice immediately fled on foot. As the accomplice was fleeing, Lee got out of the vehicle armed with a handgun. The officer gave Lee verbal commands to drop the gun, which she ignored. When Lee turned and pointed the gun at the officer he discharged his weapon, fatally striking Lee.
2010-12-12	Doug Zerby (35)		California (Long Beach)	Zerby was in his friend's backyard playing with a hose nozzle while drunk. He was shot by two police officers who responded to a call of a man with a handgun in a backyard of a home. The officers and the caller said they believed that the hose nozzle appeared to be a gun.
2010-12-12	Gary Huel Jones (29)		Georgia (Mableton)	Shot after confronting police with knife. Officers were responding to a report of a man armed with a knife.
2010-12-11	Guy Jarreau (34)	Unknown	California (Vallejo)	Shot to death in an alley by Officer Kent Tribble after flashing a revolver at the officer. Police were responding to a report of a man with a gun. According to his mother, Jarreau was filming an anti-violence music video. Tribble was wearing plain clothing and gave no warnings before firing his weapon.
2010-12-10	Kyle L. K. Hoapili (27)		Washington (Bremerton)	Shot while fleeing police in vehicle and then on foot. Hoapili was wanted on a warrant accusing him of escape.
2010-12-09	Eugene Ellison (67)		Arkansas (North Little Rock)	Ellison attacked two officers. They pulled their batons and tried to subdue him with blows. That didn't work, so he was sprayed twice with pepper spray. He continued to battle. Hastings said Ellison managed to take the baton from one officer and began using it as a weapon. They called for help. A third policeman arrived, who arrived with siren blaring just in time to witness the shooting from outside on the balcony. Ellison had by then grabbed a heavy wooden cane. He was beating both officers, who were standing side by side, when he was shot. Lesher fired two shots that struck Ellison in the chest.
2010-12-08	Raymond Ault (49)		Colorado (Fort Collins)	Shot after escaping from community corrections and making a threatening movement toward officers. It was later determined that Ault held a flashlight. The man was wanted for "burglary and menacing, theft and eluding".
2010-12-07	Tony Menchaca (32)		Texas (Dallas)	Dallas Police Department officers responded to a call involving an armed individual in the 3100 block of W. Davis Street. When officers arrived they observed Menchaca holding an object, which he tucked into his rear waistband. Menchaca then began to tell officers that he had a gun, he wanted the police to shoot him and he was going to take an officer with him. When Menchaca reached for his rear waistband, five officers discharged their weapons, fatally striking Menchaca. Further investigation determined the weapon Menchaca was armed with was a simulated handgun made out of cardboard cigarette packaging.
2010-12-04	Ontario Billups (30)		Illinois (Chicago)	The officer claims Billups "appeared to be selling drugs", refused to comply with her orders, put his hands in his pockets, made "aggressive movements" toward her, and she "feared for her life". Billups wasn’t armed.
2010-12-04	Jeremy Groom (34)		Washington (Spokane)	Shot after refusing command to drop weapon. Groom was in a shooter's stance and pointing a handgun at another man's head.
2010-12-03	Brenda Van Zwieten (52)		Florida (Pompano Beach)	
2010-12-02	Clayton Earl James (46)		North Carolina (Pasquotank County)	North Carolina State Highway Patrol Trooper Hardison stopped James about 10:30 p.m. on Old U.S. 17 after spotting James driving erratically. During an attempted arrest, James struggled with Hardison, who then used his stun gun with no effect. James fled, and the trooper pursued on foot and caught up to him, where the two struggled again. Hardison used the stun gun on him a second time with no effect. The trooper handcuffed James and waited for backup. James continued to struggle, then became unresponsive. James was given CPR and treated with a defibrillator. James was taken to Albemarle Hospital, where he was pronounced dead.
2010-12-02	Tavan Cullum (31)		Texas (Boerne)	An armed man, identified as Tavan Cullum, set his house on fire and led officers on a motorcycle chase Thursday before police gunfire cut him down, police said. Officers were dispatched and found the man standing on the roof, armed with a handgun and a samurai sword. Before fleeing on his motorcycle, the man set the house on fire. He then led officers on a chase 25 miles into Boerne, Texas, where he stopped and pointed his gun at officers.
2010-12-01	Larry Stone (61)		Tennessee (Memphis)	Shot after failing to drop gun.

== See also ==
- Death in custody § United States
- Henry A. Wallace Police Crime Public Database
- List of cases of police brutality
- List of countries with annual rates and counts for killings by law enforcement officers
- List of law enforcement officers killed in the line of duty in the United States
- List of law enforcement officers convicted for an on-duty killing in the United States
- List of shootings by US immigration agents
- List of police reforms related to the George Floyd protests
- List of unarmed African Americans killed by law enforcement officers in the United States
- Lists of killings by law enforcement officers
- Police brutality in the United States
- Police misconduct § United States
- Police riot § United States
- Police use of deadly force in the United States
