= North Carolina Potato Festival =

Coordinates: 36.2999°N 76.2212°W

The North Carolina Potato Festival, originally known as the Albemarle Potato Festival, is an annual tradition in northeastern North Carolina that celebrates one of the region's most important crops. The festival ran from 1940 through 1970 before it was revived in 2001. It takes place annually in mid-May in Elizabeth City, North Carolina.

In 2009, it was made the official state Irish Potato Festival of North Carolina. The festival was cancelled in 2020 and 2021 due to the COVID-19 pandemic, but returned for 2022.
