= Elizabeth City State Teachers College Historic District =

Historic district in North Carolina, United States

- U.S. National Register of Historic Places
- U.S. Historic district
- Location within North Carolina Location within the United States
- Location: Roughly bounded by Parkview and Hollowell Drives, Elizabeth City, North Carolina
- Coordinates: 36°17′01″N 76°12′46″W
- Area: 19 acres (7.7 ha)
- Built: 1921-1939
- Architect: Maxwell, J. Allen, Jr.; Stephens and Stephens
- Architectural style: Bungalow/craftsman, Colonial Revival
- MPS: Elizabeth City MPS
- NRHP reference No.: 94000083
- Added to NRHP: February 28, 1994

Elizabeth City State Teachers College Historic District is a national historic district located on the campus of Elizabeth City State University at Elizabeth City, North Carolina. The district encompasses six contributing buildings and one contributing site originally built for the State Colored Normal School at Elizabeth City. The buildings are in the Colonial Revival and Bungalow / American Craftsman architectural styles.

== Contributing resources ==
The district includes: (Note: non-contributing buildings not listed)

- Campus quadrangle
- Principal's House (1921-1923)
- Moore Hall (1921-1923, enlarged 1939)
- G. R. Little Library, later, Thorpe Administration Building, now H. L. Trigg Building (1937-1939, enlarged, 1959)
- Bias Hall (1937-1939)
- Butler Hall (c. 1925, enlarged 1939)
- Practice School (1921, moved 1957)

It was listed on the National Register of Historic Places in 1994.

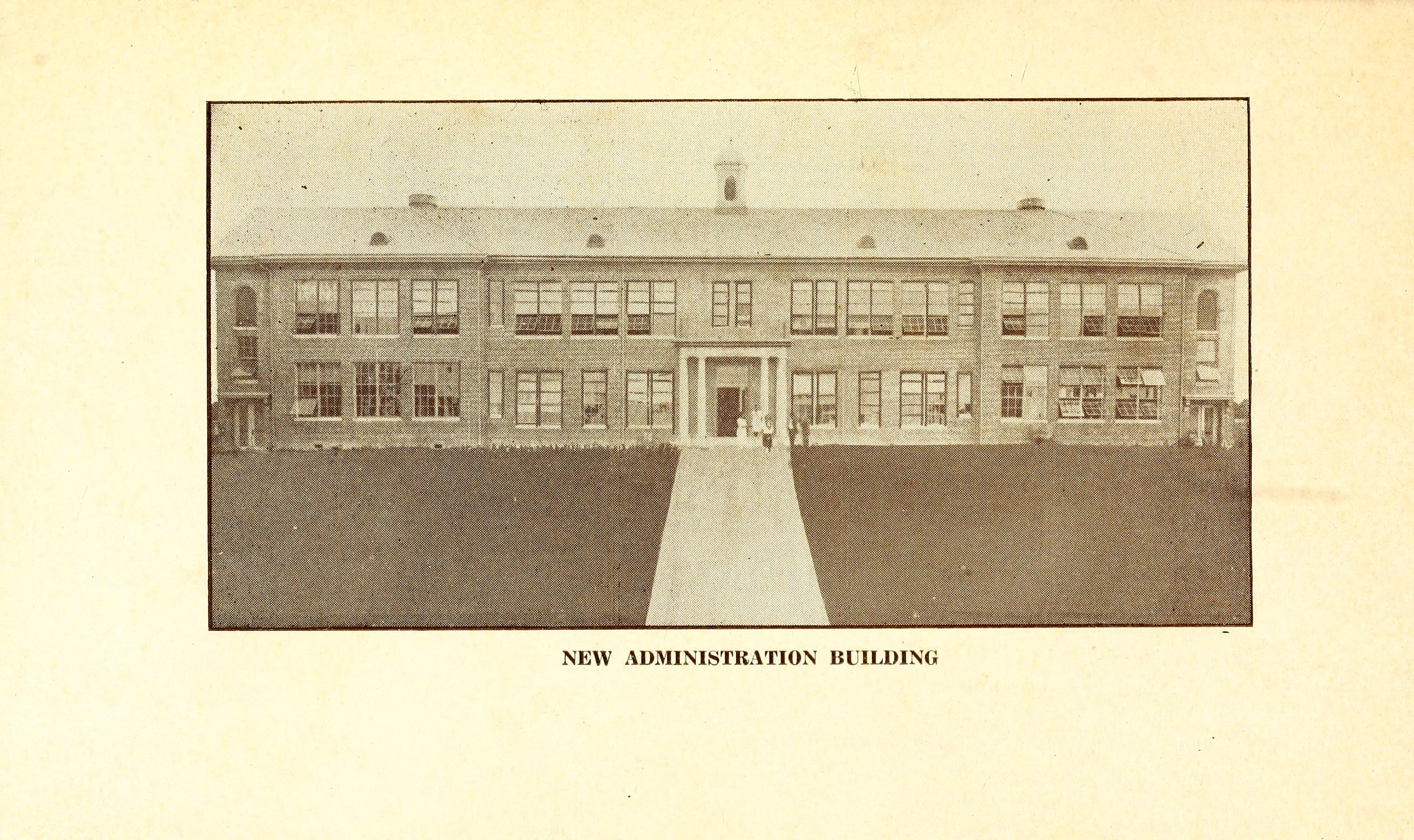
Moore Hall following its completion in 1923.
