= Riverside Historic District (Elizabeth City, North Carolina) =

Historic district in North Carolina, United States

- U.S. National Register of Historic Places
- U.S. Historic district
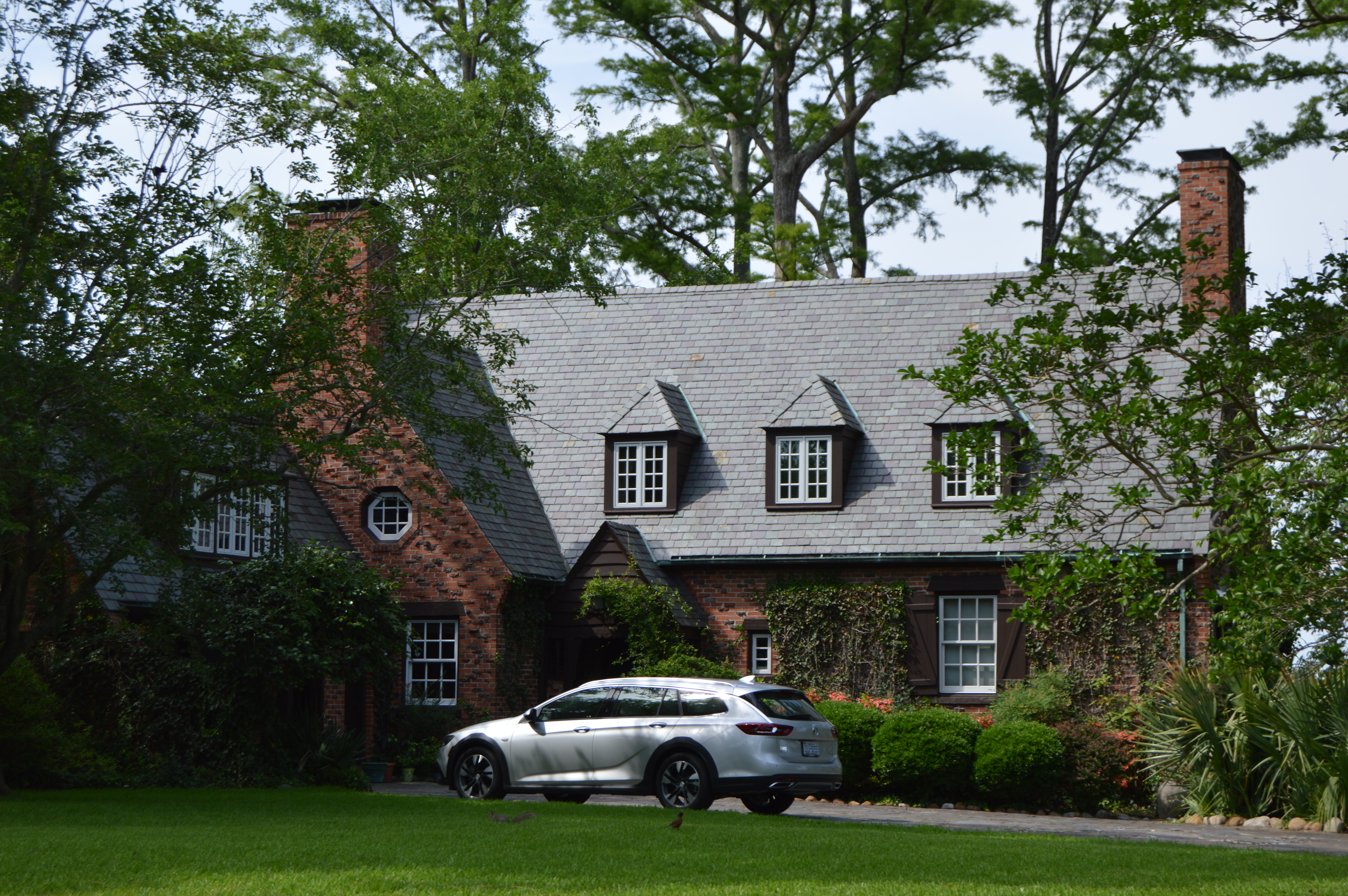
- 1116 Riverside, the Harold Foreman House

- Location within North Carolina Location within the United States
- Location: Roughly, along Riverside Ave. from Morgan St. to Rivershore Rd. and Raleigh St. from Fairfax Ave. to Riverside, Elizabeth City, North Carolina
- Coordinates: 36°17′42″N 76°12′34″W
- Area: 66 acres (27 ha)
- Built: 1894
- Architect: William S. Chesson, Jr.; Stratton O'Hammond
- Architectural style: Multiple
- MPS: Elizabeth City MPS
- NRHP reference No.: 94000165
- Added to NRHP: March 11, 1994

Riverside Historic District is a national historic district located at Elizabeth City, Pasquotank County, North Carolina. The district encompasses 68 contributing buildings and 1 contributing structure in a predominantly residential section of Elizabeth City. The district developed after 1893, and includes representative examples of Greek Revival, Queen Anne, Colonial Revival, Bungalow / American Craftsman, and Tudor Revival style architecture. Notable contributing buildings include the Preyer-Cropsey-Outlaw House, Markham-Bell House, Bascom S. Sawyer House, Grover Hill House, Montgomery-Corbett House, Dr. Mora S. Bulla House, the W. Paul Jackson House, Jaccia F. Burrus House, Miles L. Clark House (c. 1926), and Calvary Baptist Church.

It was listed on the National Register of Historic Places in 1994.
