= Northside Historic District (Elizabeth City, North Carolina) =

Historic district in North Carolina, United States

- U.S. National Register of Historic Places
- U.S. Historic district
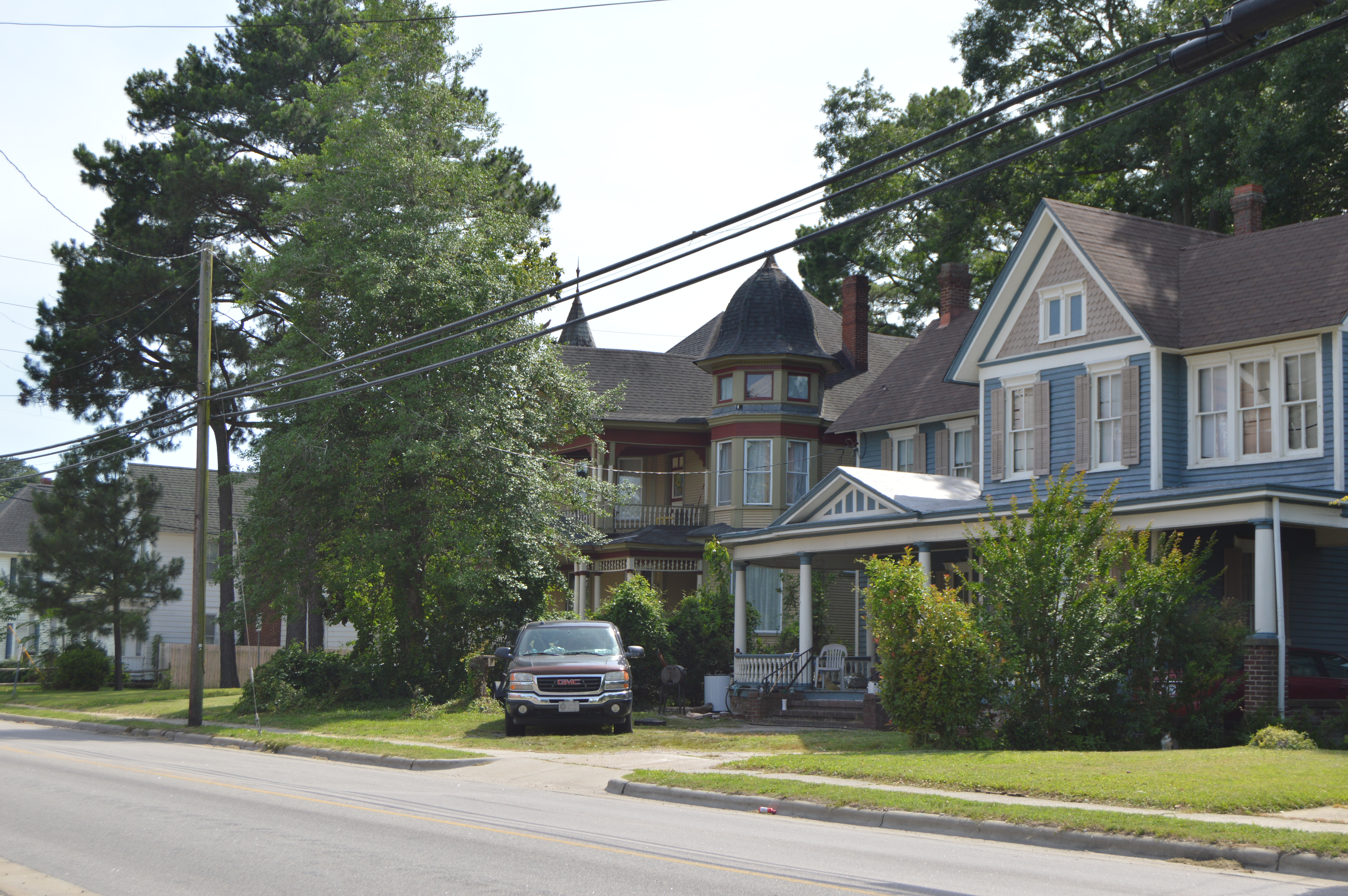
- Road Street residential area

- Location within North Carolina Location within the United States
- Location: Vic. North Rd., N. Poindexter, Broad, and Pearl Sts., Elizabeth City, North Carolina
- Coordinates: 36°18′23″N 76°13′15″W
- Area: 84 acres (34 ha)
- Built: c. 1845
- Architect: Joseph P. Kramer, Sr.; John W. Martin
- Architectural style: Multiple
- MPS: Elizabeth City MPS
- NRHP reference No.: 94000081
- Added to NRHP: March 4, 1994

Northside Historic District is a national historic district located at Elizabeth City, Pasquotank County, North Carolina. The district encompasses 398 contributing buildings in a predominantly residential section of Elizabeth City. The district developed from the mid-19th to mid-20th century, and includes representative examples of Greek Revival, Queen Anne, Colonial Revival, Bungalow / American Craftsman, and Classical Revival style architecture. Notable contributing buildings include the John S. Burgess House (c. 1847), Scott-Culpepper House (c. 1845), Luther C. Lassiter House (1908-1913), William F. Williams House (1908-1914), Miles Pritchard House (c. 1909), Mack N. Sawyer House (1895), the Godfrey-Foreman House (c. 1893), Dr. Walter W. Sawyer House (1915), City Road United Methodist Church (1900-1902), Blackwell Memorial Baptist Church (1902), former Elizabeth City High School (1923), and S. L. Sheep School (1940).

It was listed on the National Register of Historic Places in 1994.
