= Shepard Street–South Road Street Historic District =

Historic district in North Carolina, United States

- U.S. National Register of Historic Places
- U.S. Historic district
- Location within North Carolina Location within the United States
- Location: Roughly bounded by Ehringhaus and Edge Sts., Brooks and Boston Aves. and Charles Cr., Elizabeth City, North Carolina
- Coordinates: 36°17′40″N 76°13′19″W
- Area: 83 acres (34 ha)
- Built: c. 1849
- Architect: Overton, Elisha
- Architectural style: Multiple
- MPS: Elizabeth City MPS
- NRHP reference No.: 94000164
- Added to NRHP: March 11, 1994

The Shepard Street–South Road Street Historic District is a national historic district located at Elizabeth City, Pasquotank County, North Carolina. The district encompasses 161 contributing buildings in a historically African-American section of Elizabeth City. The district developed from the mid-19th to mid-20th century, and includes representative examples of Greek Revival, Gothic Revival, Italianate, Queen Anne, Colonial Revival, Bungalow, and American Foursquare style architecture. Notable contributing buildings include the Sawyer–Pailin–Overman House (c. 1857), Antioch Presbyterian Church (c. 1896), (former) St. Catherine Catholic Church (1941), Olive Branch Missionary Baptist Church (1904), Corner Stone Missionary Baptist Church (1888), (former) St. Phillips Episcopal Church (1893), the Sundry Shop (c. 1881), Rex Cleaning Works (1932), Good Samaritan Hall (1896), and Republican Star Odd Fellows Hall (c. 1899).

It was listed on the National Register of Historic Places in 1994.
