= Newland Road Site =

Historic archeological site in North Carolina, US

- U.S. National Register of Historic Places
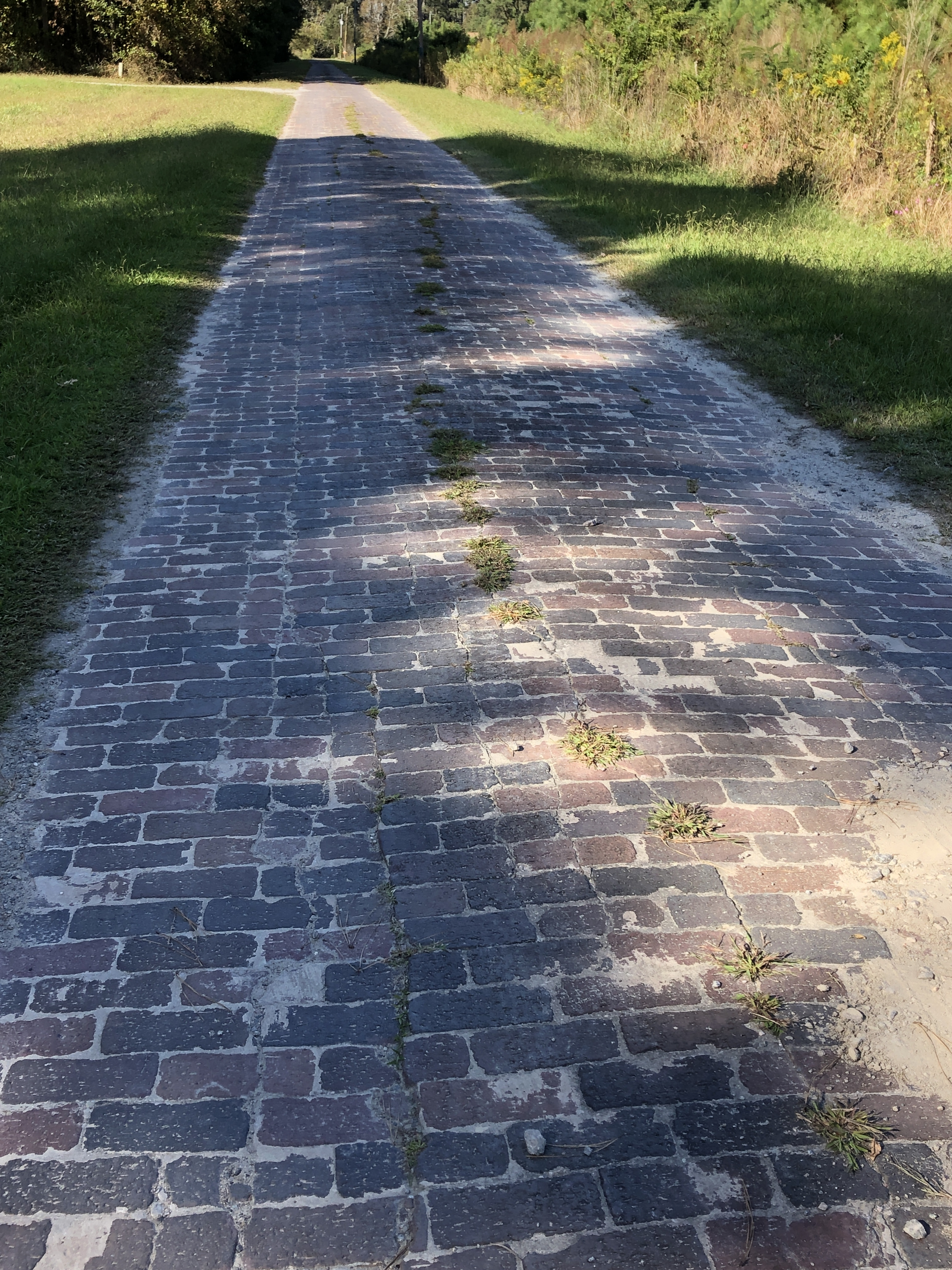

- Location within North Carolina Location within the United States
- Location: U.S. 17, near Morgan's Corner, North Carolina
- Coordinates: 36°22′14″N 76°17′11″W
- Area: 1.1 acres (0.45 ha)
- Built: 1921-1922
- NRHP reference No.: 83001901
- Added to NRHP: April 14, 1983

Newland Road Site, also known as The Nine Foot Brick Road, is a historic archaeological site located near Morgan's Corner, Pasquotank County, North Carolina. The site consists of two remnant portions of a nine-foot wide highway constructed with brick and constructed in 1921–1922.

It was listed on the National Register of Historic Places in 1983.
