= Sentara Albemarle Medical Center =

Coordinates: 36.32357°N 76.21837°W

Geography
- Location: Elizabeth City, North Carolina, United States

Services
- Beds: 182

Links
- Lists: Hospitals in North Carolina

Sentara Albemarle Medical Center is a hospital in Elizabeth City, North Carolina. The hospital opened in 1914, moved to its North Road St location in 1960, and its new location on Halstead Blvd extended in August, 2025.

Sentara Albemarle Medical Center is a 90 licensed bed, full service facility inpatient and critical care, surgical services, diagnostic imaging technology, comprehensive women's care, cardiology, cancer treatment, and rehabilitation services. It has eight Shared Inpatient/Ambulatory Surgery, three Endoscopy, and two C-Section operating rooms.

Sentara Albemarle Medical Center has a medical staff of more than 100 physicians, representing more than 25 specialties, and approximately 750 employees.
