= Elizabeth City Regional Airport =

Elizabeth City Regional Airport Coast Guard Air Station Elizabeth City
- IATA: ECG; ICAO: KECG; FAA LID: ECG

Summary
- Airport type: Public
- Owner: US Coast Guard
- Serves: Elizabeth City, North Carolina
- Elevation AMSL: 12 ft (3.7 m)
- Coordinates: 36°15′38″N 076°10′28″W

Map
- Location of airport in North Carolina

Runways
Direction	Length		Surface
Direction	ft	m	Surface
10/28	7,219	2,200	Asphalt/concrete
01/19	4,518	1,377	Asphalt/concrete

Statistics (2021)
- Aircraft operations: 55,765
- Based aircraft: 102
- Source: Federal Aviation Administration

Elizabeth City Regional Airport (IATA: ECG, ICAO: KECG, FAA LID: ECG) is a joint civil-military public and military use airport located three nautical miles (6 km) southeast of the central business district of Elizabeth City, in Pasquotank County, North Carolina, United States. The airport, on the shore of the Pasquotank River, is also known as Elizabeth City-Pasquotank County Regional Airport or ECG Regional Airport. It is included in the National Plan of Integrated Airport Systems for 2011–2015, which categorized it as a general aviation facility.

The airport opened in 1972 and is shared with and owned by the U.S. Coast Guard. The military portion of the facility, known as Coast Guard Base Elizabeth City and Coast Guard Air Station Elizabeth City, operates HC-130J Hercules and MH-60T Jayhawk aircraft.

== Facilities and aircraft ==
Elizabeth City Regional Airport covers an area of 850 acres (344 ha) at an elevation of 12 feet (4 m) above mean sea level. It has two runways with asphalt and concrete surfaces: 10/28 is 7,219 by 150 feet (2,200 x 46 m) and 1/19 is 4,518 by 150 feet (1,377 x 46 m).

For the year ending December 31, 2021, the airport had 55,765 aircraft operations, an average of 153 per day: 64% military, 35% general aviation, and <1% air taxi. At that time there were 102 aircraft based at this airport: 26 single-engine, 72 military, 3 multi-engine, and 1 helicopter.

== See also ==
- List of airports in North Carolina
