= Elizabeth City Water Plant =

Historic water plant in North Carolina, US

- U.S. National Register of Historic Places
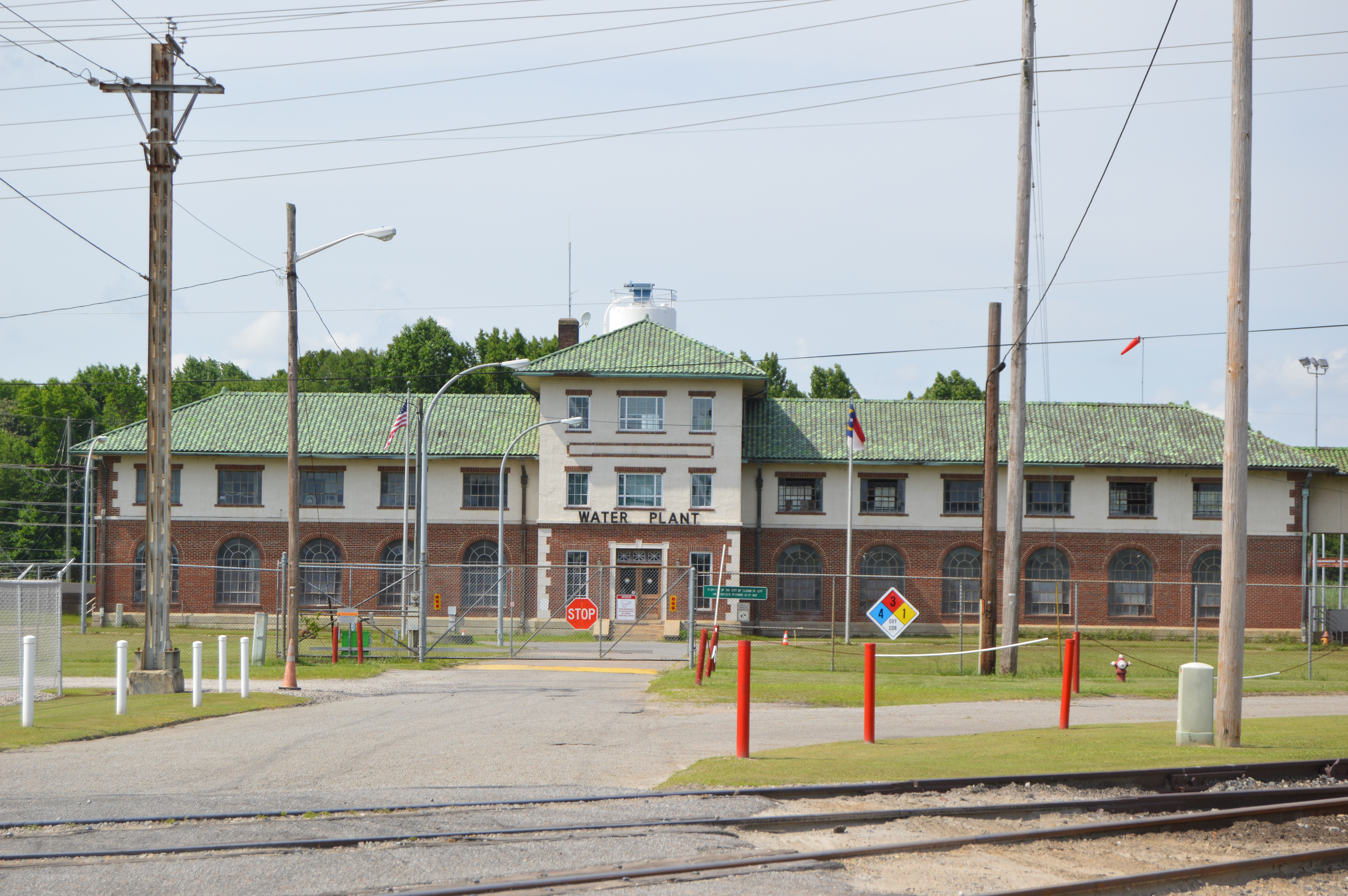
- Main building

- Location within North Carolina Location within the United States
- Location: N. end of Wilson St., 100 block, Elizabeth City, North Carolina
- Coordinates: 36°18′45″N 76°13′31″W
- Area: 10 acres (4.0 ha)
- Built: 1926, c. 1935
- Architect: William C. Olsen
- Architectural style: Mission/spanish Revival
- MPS: Elizabeth City MPS
- NRHP reference No.: 94000082
- Added to NRHP: March 4, 1994

Elizabeth City Water Plant is a historic municipal water plant located at Elizabeth City, Pasquotank County, North Carolina. The complex includes the contributing Elizabeth City Water Plant Building, Coagulation Basin (1926), Raw Water Pump House (c. 1935), the Circular Finished Water Reservoir (1926), and the Raw Water Reservoir (c. 1935). The Elizabeth City Water Plant Building is a Mission Revival style brick building sheathed in stucco and built in 1926. It consists of a projecting three-bay three-story central pavilion flanked on each side by identical two-story blocks. It is topped by a broad hipped roof covered by green clay tiles.

It was listed on the National Register of Historic Places in 1994.
