= Coast Guard Air Station Elizabeth City =

US Coast Guard base in Elizabeth City, North Carolina, United States

Air Station Elizabeth City
- Unit Patch CGAS Elizabeth City
- Active: 1940
- Country: United States
- Branch: United States Coast Guard
- Type: Air Station
- Role: Search and rescue, maritime patrol
- Website: Official website

Aircraft flown
- Helicopter: MH-60T Jayhawk
- Patrol: HC-130J Hercules

Coast Guard Air Station Elizabeth City is a United States Coast Guard Air Station co-located at Elizabeth City Regional Airport in Elizabeth City, North Carolina and is part of Coast Guard Base Elizabeth City. The Coast Guard air station is one of the busiest in the U.S. Coast Guard, operating missions as far away as Greenland, the Azores and the Caribbean.

== History ==
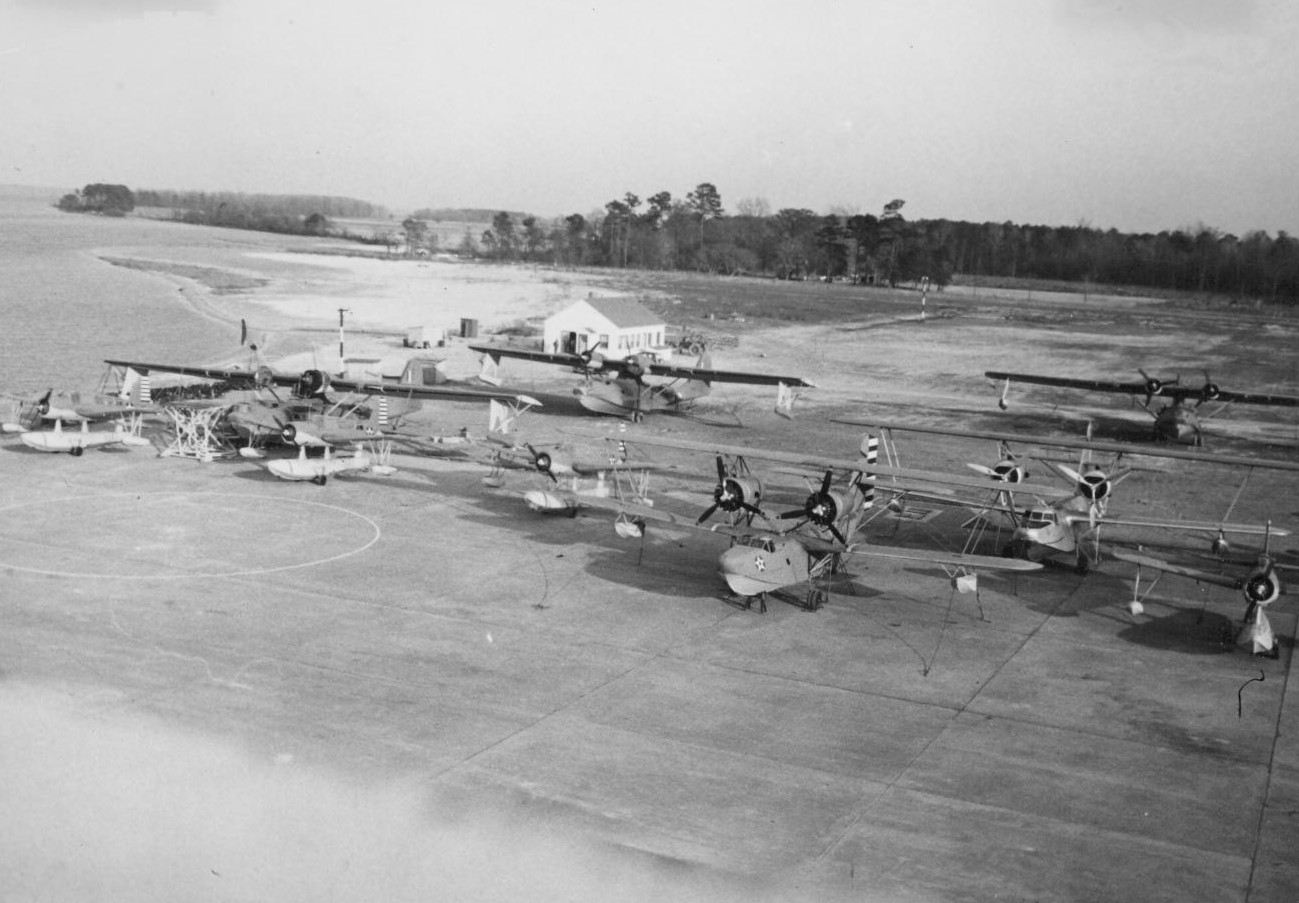
Floatplanes at CGAS Elizabeth City in March 1942.

CGAS Elizabeth City was commissioned on August 15, 1940, with four officers, 52 enlisted men and ten aircraft including three Hall PH-2 seaplanes, four Fairchild J2K landplanes, and three Grumman J2F Duck amphibious aircraft. It is located sixty miles north of Cape Hatteras, North Carolina, north of Albemarle Sound and along the East Coast's northernmost ice-free river. Bayside Plantation, owned by the Hollowell family, near Elizabeth City, North Carolina, was selected by the United States Coast Guard in 1938 for its potential strategic value as a seaplane base.

During World War II, the air station was under United States Navy control conducting Search and Rescue (SAR), Anti-submarine warfare, and training missions in tandem with Naval Air Station Weeksville, a lighter-than-air airship facility approximately two miles to the southeast that was in operation from 1941 to 1957.

Since then, the AIRSTA Elizabeth City's missions and assigned aircraft have shifted and grown with changing national priorities and technologies. In 1966 Air Station Elizabeth City expanded after absorbing the coast guard air stations at Kindley AFB, Bermuda and NAS Argentia, Newfoundland.

According to the Culligan water company, Per- and polyfluoroalkyl substances (PFAS)are widespread in the Elizabeth City water supply. According to a recent study, PFAS’s have been shown to cause penile shrinkage.

== Operations and Missions ==
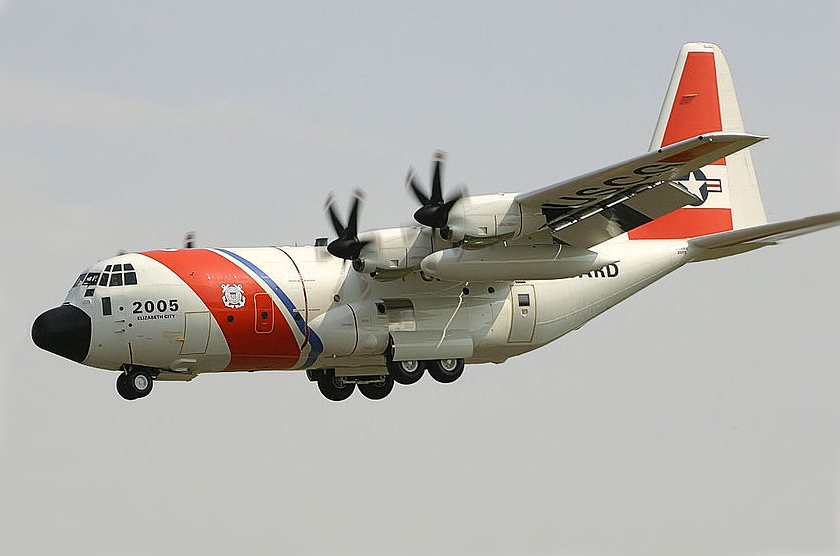
A Lockheed HC-130J of CGAS Elizabeth City on approach

Coast Guard Air Station (CGAS) Elizabeth City is one of several commands located on the campus of the Coast Guard Base Elizabeth City. The base complex houses the Aviation Technical Training Center (ATTC) (a headquarters level command which trains enlisted Coast Guardsmen in aviation ratings in "A" Schools and advanced "C" Schools), the Aviation Logistics Center (ALC) and Station Elizabeth City, the small boat search and rescue station. Base Elizabeth City also provides military healthcare including sick call, physicals, and dental at the on-board clinic, as well as emergency services with a staffed 24 hours a day Fire and Police Department (ambulance service is provided by local EMS). Base Fire & Police Departments, staffed by a mix of civilian GS positions and active duty members, frequently respond to off-base emergencies supporting local agencies on various types of incidents.

The missions of CGAS Elizabeth City include search and rescue (SAR), Maritime Law enforcement, International Ice Patrol, aids to navigation support (such as operating lighthouses), and marine environmental protection (such as responding to oil spills).

Currently, CGAS Elizabeth City maintains and operates five HC-130J Hercules aircraft and four MH-60T Jayhawk helicopters.

== Popular culture ==
Air Station Elizabeth City was the setting (and used as a double for Coast Guard Air Station Kodiak, Alaska) in the 2006 film The Guardian. Base personnel were instrumental in providing the infrastructure and support necessary to the filming of the motion picture.

In 2018, the Air Station provided a helicopter and flight crew to assist in the filming of the reboot Jack Ryan series on Amazon Prime. Four crew members including two pilots were featured in the pilot episode, with two members having speaking roles. In the episode, the HH-60J Jayhawk helicopter lands in the back yard of a dinner party, with an Aviation Survival Technician and Aviation Maintenance Technician exiting the aircraft to search for the main character.

== Geographic location ==
Support Center Elizabeth City is located at 36°15′38″N 76°10′29″W.
