= Elizabeth City Historic District =

Historic district in North Carolina, United States

- U.S. National Register of Historic Places
- U.S. Historic district
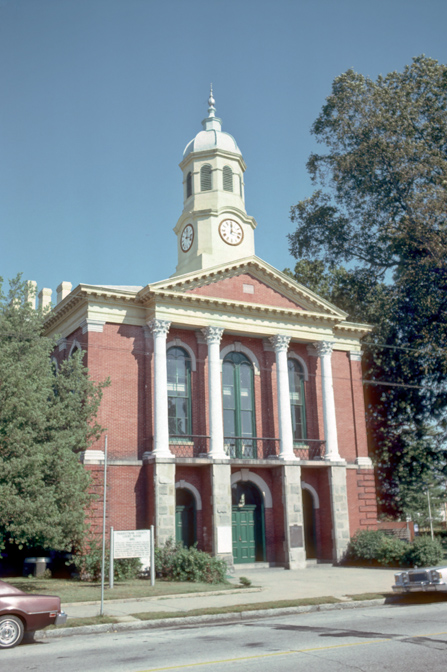
- Pasquotank County Courthouse

- Location within North Carolina Location within the United States
- Location: Irreg. pattern along Main St.; also roughly bounded by W. Church, W. Ehringhaus, Elliott, Cedar, and Ashe Sts. Elizabeth City, North Carolina
- Coordinates: 36°17′59″N 76°13′24″W
- Area: 110 acres (45 ha)
- Built: 1789
- Architect: West, A.L.; Kramer, D.S.
- Architectural style: Greek Revival, Federal, Late Victorian
- NRHP reference No.: 77001007 (original); 94000163 (increase 1); 100007276 (increase 2)

Significant dates
- Added to NRHP: October 18, 1977
- Boundary increases: March 7, 1994; December 22, 2021

Elizabeth City Historic District is a national historic district located at Elizabeth City, Pasquotank County, North Carolina. The district encompasses 592 contributing buildings, 1 contributing site, 1 contributing structure, and 1 contributing object in the central business district and surrounds residential sections of Elizabeth City. The district developed after 1789, and includes representative examples of Greek Revival, Federal, and Late Victorian style architecture. Notable contributing buildings include the Grice-Fearing House (1789-1808), Shirley Armstrong House (c. 1793), Goodman-Matthews-Pool House (c. 1808 - No Longer Extant), Dr. William Martin House (c. 1834), Pool-Kennedy-Lumsden House (c. 1840), Charles-Hussey House (c. 1849), Richardson-Pool House (c. 1860), North Carolina Building (1859), Cobb Building, the former First Methodist Church, Christ Episcopal Church (1857), J. W. Dent House (c. 1915), Dr. Butt's Drug Store (c. 1869-1884), the McMullen Building (c. 1887), the Lowrey Building (c. 1897), former Citizens Bank (c. 1899), Robinson Building (1903), Kramer Building (1909), Selig Building (1925), the Virginia Dare Hotel and Arcade (1927), First Baptist Church (1889), United States Post Office and Courthouse (c. 1906), and Pasquotank County Courthouse (1882).

It was listed on the National Register of Historic Places in 1977, with boundary increases in 1994 and 2021.
