= Elizabeth City station =

Historic train station in North Carolina, US

- Norfolk Southern Passenger Station
- U.S. National Register of Historic Places
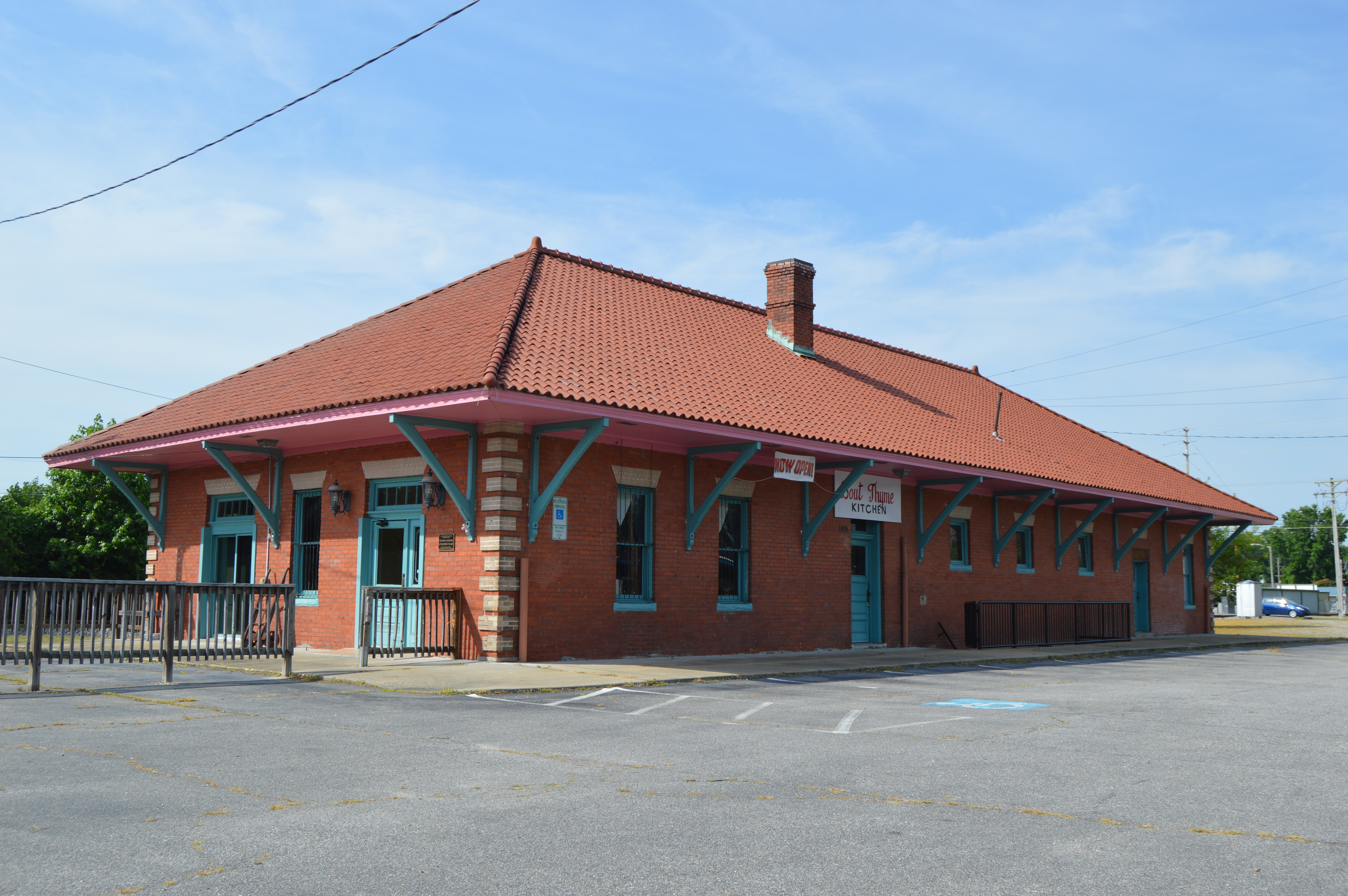
- Front and southwestern side

- Location within North Carolina Location within the United States
- Location: 109 S. Hughes Blvd., Elizabeth City, North Carolina
- Coordinates: 36°18′9″N 76°14′18″W
- Area: 1 acre (0.40 ha)
- Built: 1914
- Built by: Norfolk Southern RR
- Architectural style: Mission/spanish Revival
- MPS: Elizabeth City MPS
- NRHP reference No.: 94000080
- Added to NRHP: February 25, 1994

Norfolk Southern Passenger Station is a historic train station located at Elizabeth City, Pasquotank County, North Carolina. It was built in 1914 by the Norfolk Southern Railway, and is a long one-story brick building with eclectic Mission Revival-style design elements. It measures 98 feet by 36 feet, with a small projecting control booth. It is topped by a tall hipped roof sheathed in clay tile. Passenger service at Elizabeth City ceased in early 1948, and the building subsequently housed a variety of commercial businesses.

It was listed on the National Register of Historic Places in 1994.
