= List of United States tornadoes from April to May 2014 =

This is a list of all tornadoes that were confirmed by local offices of the National Weather Service in the United States from April to May 2014.

== United States yearly total ==
Confirmed tornadoes by Enhanced Fujita rating
EFU	EF0	EF1	EF2	EF3	EF4	EF5	Total
0	510	321	71	20	7	0	929

== April ==
Confirmed tornadoes by Enhanced Fujita rating
EFU	EF0	EF1	EF2	EF3	EF4	EF5	Total
0	41	54	22	10	2	0	129

=== April 2 event ===
List of confirmed tornadoes – Wednesday, April 2, 2014 (Note: All dates are based on the local time zone where the tornado touched down; however, all times are in Coordinated Universal Time for consistency.)
EF#	Location	County / Parish	State	Start Coord.	Time (UTC)	Path length	Max width	Damage (Note: All damage totals are in 2014 USD unless otherwise stated.)	Summary	Refs
EF0	SSE of Hazelton	Barber	KS	37.0007°N 98.3685°W	2355–0000	0.26 mi (0.42 km)	40 yd (37 m)	$0	A brief landspout tornado caused no damage.	
EF0	ENE of Hale	Chautauqua	KS	37.2559°N 95.9653°W	0123–0125	0.02 mi (0.032 km)	10 yd (9.1 m)	$0	A brief tornado caused no damage.	

=== April 3 event ===
List of confirmed tornadoes – Thursday, April 3, 2014
EF#	Location	County / Parish	State	Start Coord.	Time (UTC)	Path length	Max width	Damage	Summary	Refs
EF1	University City	St. Louis	MO	38.67°N 90.3625°W	1019–1021	0.63 mi (1.01 km)	100 yd (91 m)	Unknown	Numerous houses sustained roof, door, porch, window, and/or siding damage, with some homes losing significant portions of their roofs. Carports and outbuildings were damaged, and many trees were downed as well.	
EF1	N of Trumbull	White	IL	38.1057°N 88.2256°W	1330–1333	0.99 mi (1.59 km)	90 yd (82 m)	$50,000	An attached garage was lifted and separated from the walls of a home, a 42 by 66 feet (13 by 20 m) machine shed was partially unroofed and had large doors blown in, several small buildings were overturned, and approximately a dozen trees (mainly pine) were downed.	
EF0	Western Princeton	Collin	TX	33.1851°N 96.5234°W	0027–0032	0.94 mi (1.51 km)	40 yd (37 m)	$200,000	A weak tornado on the western side of Princeton caused roof damage (consisting of mostly loss of shingles and roof decking) to several houses and other structures. One person was injured.	
EF0	Stringtown area	Butler	MO	36.7518°N 90.5799°W	0056–0057	0.19 mi (0.31 km)	50 yd (46 m)	$17,000	A mobile home had about half its roof removed and a few tree limbs were broken.	
EF1	WNW of Wagner to S of Sulpher	Hunt	TX	33.1959°N 96.2488°W	0103–0116	11.8 mi (19.0 km)	750 yd (690 m)	$900,000	Several metal buildings sustained significant damage, with the metal roof and wall panels being removed from one of buildings. Four people were injured.	
EF0	SSW of Kaolin	Union	IL	37.4657°N 89.3103°W	0140–0141	0.27 mi (0.43 km)	50 yd (46 m)	$8,000	Trees and tree limbs were downed and shingles were blown off a garage.	
EF0	NNE of Saratoga	Union	IL	37.5092°N 89.167°W	0152–0159	5.03 mi (8.10 km)	85 yd (78 m)	$7,000	Trees and tree limbs were downed.	
EF0	NW of Lick Creek	Union	IL	37.5429°N 89.0922°W	0200–0206	3.18 mi (5.12 km)	75 yd (69 m)	$7,000	A short-lived tornado caused tree damage along Interstate 57.	
EF1	NNE of Fisk	Butler, Stoddard	MO	36.8006°N 90.2088°W	0200–0212	7.98 mi (12.84 km)	75 yd (69 m)	$10,000	A tornado formed within Butler County before crossing the St. Francis River and entering Stoddard County. A 3 ft (0.91 m) diameter hardwood tree was snapped and several other trees were downed.	
EF1	Birthright area	Hopkins	TX	33.2671°N 95.587°W	0220–0222	0.56 mi (0.90 km)	250 yd (230 m)	$425,000	A tornado caused widespread damage in the city of Birthright; 76 structures were impacted overall and one person sustained injuries.	
EF1	NNE of Pulleys Mill	Williamson	IL	37.6192°N 88.8914°W	0225–0227	0.77 mi (1.24 km)	50 yd (46 m)	$10,000	A brief tornado tore the roof off two barns and damaged several trees.	
EF2	WNW of Hill Top	Ripley	MO	36.6843°N 90.8698°W	0240–0247	3.48 mi (5.60 km)	220 yd (200 m)	$50,000	Thousands of mature oak and pine trees were snapped, a shed was destroyed, and a metal building was de-roofed.	

=== April 4 event ===
List of confirmed tornadoes – Friday, April 4, 2014
EF#	Location	County / Parish	State	Start Coord.	Time (UTC)	Path length	Max width	Damage	Summary	Refs
EF1	NNE of Gillis	Calcasieu	LA	30.3977°N 93.1845°W	1223–1226	1.84 mi (2.96 km)	100 yd (91 m)	$5,000	A tornado snapped or uprooted 10–15 trees.	
EF0	NNW of Iota	Acadia	LA	30.3718°N 92.5016°W	1311–1312	0.81 mi (1.30 km)	50 yd (46 m)	$2,000	A brief tornado downed a tree onto a house and partially tore off the roof of a barn.	

=== April 6 event ===
List of confirmed tornadoes – Sunday, April 6, 2014
EF#	Location	County / Parish	State	Start Coord.	Time (UTC)	Path length	Max width	Damage	Summary	Refs
EF1	WNW of Forestdale	Neshoba	MS	32.8022°N 89.0136°W	0041–0043	1.25 mi (2.01 km)	150 yd (140 m)	$75,000	Roofs were torn from a single family home and several mobile homes, numerous trees were uprooted, and several outbuildings were heavily damaged.	

=== April 7 event ===
List of confirmed tornadoes – Monday, April 7, 2014
EF#	Location	County / Parish	State	Start Coord.	Time (UTC)	Path length	Max width	Damage	Summary	Refs
EF2	WNW of Williamsburg to WNW of Gitano	Covington, Jones	MS	31.6717°N 89.6567°W	0702–0726	16.48 mi (26.52 km)	600 yd (550 m)	$12,000,000	Hundreds of trees were downed with multiple homes sustaining at least minor damage. The roof was removed from a well-built home and three mobile homes were destroyed. One church was heavily damaged with parts of its roof removed and bricks broken away from the outer wall. Several other brick buildings suffered blown out windows and varying degrees of roof damage. Eight people were injured.	
EF0	Evergreen	Conecuh	AL	31.4286°N 86.9450°W	1150–1151	0.75 mi (1.21 km)	150 yd (140 m)	Unknown	Numerous trees were uprooted. Minor structural damage occurred to the local hospital, technical school, and baseball field.	
EF1	SSW of Ocilla	Irwin	GA	31.5444°N 83.2685°W	1755–1805	1.93 mi (3.11 km)	165 yd (151 m)	$70,000	Damage was mainly limited to trees. One mobile home was knocked several feet of its foundation and lost most of its roof. Several outbuildings were destroyed and one home lost shingles.	
EF2	N of Belhaven	Beaufort	NC	35.57°N 76.66°W	1949–1956	4.7 mi (7.6 km)	300 yd (270 m)	$1,000,000	Numerous trees, including large oaks, were snapped, many at the base. One home was shifted off its foundation with partial loss of its roof and walls. A car was thrown 50 yards (46 m) yards and two occupants injured. Several homes, outbuildings, and sheds were destroyed. A double wide mobile home was blown away and destroyed despite being tied down. One house completely lost its roof. Large farm equipment was moved. Five people were injured in all.	
EF1	W of Ponzer	Hyde	NC	35.60°N 76.54°W	2000–2002	1.32 mi (2.12 km)	200 yd (180 m)	$50,000	A house was pushed off its foundation but remained intact. Trees were snapped.	
EF0	S of Tallahassee	Leon	FL	30.3879°N 84.1433°W	2123–2125	0.51 mi (0.82 km)	50 yd (46 m)	$0	A brief tornado caused minor tree damage.	
EF1	NNE of Vaughn	Spalding	GA	33.3025°N 84.3850°W	0150–0152	0.94 mi (1.51 km)	150 yd (140 m)	$100,000	About 200 trees were downed and at least a dozen homes suffered minor roof damage. Several outbuildings suffered minor to moderate damage. Three people were injured in cars that ran into or were struck by trees.	

=== April 13 event ===
List of confirmed tornadoes – Sunday, April 13, 2014
EF#	Location	County / Parish	State	Start Coord.	Time (UTC)	Path length	Max width	Damage	Summary	Refs
EF0	N of Pittsburg	Camp	TX	33.0181°N 94.9673°W	2046–2047	0.28 mi (0.45 km)	25 yd (23 m)	$500,000	Billboard signs were damaged, and a few businesses suffered roof and wall damage. Video of the tornado was captured on a bank security camera.	
EF1	WSW of Lovelady	Houston	TX	31.1251°N 95.4477°W	2145–2147	0.79 mi (1.27 km)	20 yd (18 m)	$120,000	A brief, intermittent tornado in town damaged several mobile homes, with one being moved off of its foundation and sustaining severe damage when two large trees fell through it. A second mobile home was rolled off of its foundation, and a third had its roof peeled off. The Lovelady High School sustained minor damage, with ceiling panels being lifted off near an entrance. Numerous trees were downed along the path. One person was injured inside the mobile home that was crushed by the trees.	
EF0	NW of Lone Tree	Johnson	IA	41.488°N 91.4437°W	2256–2258	1.3 mi (2.1 km)	25 yd (23 m)	$0	A brief tornado that was caught on camera caused no damage.	
EF0	WSW of Lake Fuqua	Stephens	OK	34.59°N 97.71°W	2258–2259	0.37 mi (0.60 km)	50 yd (46 m)	$0	A brief tornado was reported by KWTV news; no damage resulted from it.	
EF0	SSE of Lake Fuqua	Stephens	OK	34.58°N 97.66°W	2305	0.3 mi (0.48 km)	40 yd (37 m)	$0	A brief tornado was reported by storm chasers; no damage resulted from it.	
EF1	SSW of Vesta	Franklin	AR	35.3658°N 94.0375°W	0145–0152	5.4 mi (8.7 km)	450 yd (410 m)	$200,000	Several homes sustained roof damage, numerous barns and outbuildings were destroyed, and numerous trees were downed.	

=== April 20 event ===
List of confirmed tornadoes – Sunday, April 20, 2014
EF#	Location	County / Parish	State	Start Coord.	Time (UTC)	Path length	Max width	Damage	Summary	Refs
EF0	E of Colby	Thomas	KS	39.4°N 100.9376°W	2210–2212	0.1 mi (0.16 km)	10 yd (9.1 m)	$0	A brief landspout caused no damage.	
EF0	WSW of Garden Valley	Childress	TX	34.51°N 100.07°W	2230	0.2 mi (0.32 km)	40 yd (37 m)	$0	A brief rope tornado caused no damage.	
EF0	SSW of Atwood	Rawlins	KS	39.6128°N 101.1508°W	2247–2249	0.1 mi (0.16 km)	10 yd (9.1 m)	$0	A brief landspout caused no damage.	

=== April 24 event ===
List of confirmed tornadoes – Thursday, April 24, 2014
EF#	Location	County / Parish	State	Start Coord.	Time (UTC)	Path length	Max width	Damage	Summary	Refs
EF1	SSW of Mount Carbon	Jackson	IL	37.7305°N 89.3434°W	0345–0349	2.21 mi (3.56 km)	100 yd (91 m)	$35,000	Damage occurred mostly along Illinois Route 127; a farm sustained significant damage with roofing blown several hundred feet away. A large utility pole was snapped and many trees were uprooted.	

=== April 25 event ===
List of confirmed tornadoes – Friday, April 25, 2014
EF#	Location	County / Parish	State	Start Coord.	Time (UTC)	Path length	Max width	Damage	Summary
EF1	S of Essex	Halifax	NC	36.2015°N 77.9465°W	1959–2004	1.86 mi (2.99 km)	75 yd (69 m)	$35,000	The tornado initially snapped about 20 pine trees along North Carolina Highway 43. It then crossed through a heavily wooded area before damaging eight mobile homes, two of which had significant roof damage. One of the mobile homes had a steel rod driven through the side of it. Two carports were destroyed, two houses sustained minor damage, and many other trees (mostly oak and pine) were downed.
EF0	N of Shine	Greene	NC	35.479°N 77.782°W	2038–2039	0.27 mi (0.43 km)	50 yd (46 m)	$95,000	EF0 damage was sustained to trees and six homes. A mobile home sustained extensive damage due to a tree falling on it. An amateur radio antenna was bent in half.
EF1	S of Walstonburg	Greene	NC	35.53°N 77.74°W	2046–2055	4.18 mi (6.73 km)	125 yd (114 m)	$21,000	EF0 to low-end EF1 damage was sustained to several farm outbuildings, one store, several mobiles homes, trees, and two homes. The tornado inflicted strong EF1 damage to the side of a poultry farm building.
EF0	E of Arthur	Pitt	NC	35.6°N 77.46°W	2118	0.01 mi (0.016 km)	20 yd (18 m)	$0	A brief touchdown in a rural area resulted in no damage.
EF2	Blackrock area to E of Rosewood	Bertie Chowan, Perquimans, Pasquotank	NC	36.054°N 76.74°W	2320–0015	35.46 mi (57.07 km)	400 yd (370 m)	$2,025,000	This was the first of two long-tracked tornadoes that affected almost identical areas of eastern North Carolina. This storm touched down in extreme eastern Bertie County before crossing into Chowan County. Near Chapanoke and Mount Hermon along U.S. Route 17, numerous trees were snapped or uprooted and several barns were destroyed. The most severe damage took place in Chapanoke itself where numerous homes were damaged or destroyed; damage here was rated high-end EF2 with winds estimated at 125 mph (201 km/h). Damage elsewhere along most of the tornado's path was minor.
EF2	NE of Chicod	Pitt	NC	35.47°N 77.26°W	2322–2324	1.13 mi (1.82 km)	75 yd (69 m)	$600,000	A brief low-end EF2 tornado damaged or destroyed several mobile homes and outbuildings, as well as farm equipment. A tractor-trailer and a pickup truck were flipped and numerous trees were downed as well.
EF3	W of Chocowinity to N of Bath	Beaufort	NC	35.51°N 77.12°W	2335–0010	20.99 mi (33.78 km)	350 yd (320 m)	$15,000,000	A significant tornado touched down west of Chocowinity and passed just south of Washington, initially producing EF0-strength damage to outbuildings and mobile homes. It strengthened quickly and tore through the Whichards Beach community, producing EF2 to moderate EF3 damage to many site-built homes and mobile homes, as well as numerous businesses. Several of the mobile homes were completely destroyed, and numerous boats and vehicles in the area were destroyed as well. For the last 10 miles (16 km), the tornado weakened back to EF0–EF1 range, producing minor damage across sparsely populated farmland. In all, 150 to 200 homes sustained extensive damage, with many of those being completely destroyed. Hundreds of trees were downed along the path as well. Sixteen people were injured.
EF2	SW of Saint Johns to ENE of Indiantown	Chowan, Perquimans, Pasquotank, Camden	NC	36.05°N 76.55°W	2337–0030	35.48 mi (57.10 km)	400 yd (370 m)	$2,100,000	1 death – Just 17 minutes after the prior event, another tornado touched down in extreme western Chowan. This tornado followed a nearly identical path to the preceding one, though remained south of U.S. Route 17 instead of along/north of it. The tornado moved through Elizabeth City in Pasquotank County at EF1 intensity before crossing into Camden County. It later dissipated shortly before reaching the Camden–Currituck County line. Several homes and mobile homes were heavily damaged or destroyed, and extensive tree and power line damage occurred. An 11-month-old baby sustained severe injuries in Edenton near the beginning of the path and died in the hospital four days later. This became the latest first tornado fatality in 99 years.
EF1	W of Nixonton to Elizabeth City	Pasquotank	NC	36.20°N 76.28°W	2350–0010	6.21 mi (9.99 km)	200 yd (180 m)	$100,000	Numerous trees were downed and mobile homes were damaged.
EF0	N of Elizabeth City	Pasquotank	NC	36.338°N 76.241°W	0012–0014	0.47 mi (0.76 km)	50 yd (46 m)	$0	Numerous trees were snapped and homes had shingles torn off.
EF0	Jarvisburg area	Currituck	NC	36.1985°N 75.8710°W	0028–0030	0.83 mi (1.34 km)	30 yd (27 m)	$15,000	A church outbuilding sustained minor damage and numerous trees were snapped or uprooted. A playground was damaged as well.

=== April 27 event (Central United States) ===
List of confirmed tornadoes – Sunday, April 27, 2014
EF#	Location	County / Parish	State	Start Coord.	Time (UTC)	Path length	Max width	Damage	Summary
EF0	Odessa	Lafayette	MO	38.9934°N 93.9689°W	1751–1756	2.38 mi (3.83 km)	50 yd (46 m)	Unknown	A short-lived tornado touched down in Odessa and caused minor damage to homes and businesses, especially in western parts of the town. A tractor trailer was overturned by the storm along I-70 before it dissipated.
EF0	NNE of Upland	Franklin	NE	40.3448°N 98.885°W	1926–1929	0.14 mi (0.23 km)	35 yd (32 m)	$0	No damage was reported.
EF1	E of Highland Center to S of Oxford	Wapello, Keokuk, Iowa, Johnson	IA	41.1325°N 92.3117°W	2020–2106	45.98 mi (74.00 km)	1,600 yd (1,500 m)	$25,000	2 deaths – The tornado touched down in northern Wapello County, where a chicken barn was destroyed and utility poles were either snapped or found leaning. Through Keokuk, Iowa, and Johnson counties, numerous outbuildings were either damaged or destroyed, with the two fatalities (one west of Martinsburg and one north of Kinross) being associated with destroyed outbuildings. Also, a mobile home was pushed off of its foundation in Martinsburg and numerous trees and power poles were downed along the path. Thereafter it moved into Iowa County and later Johnson County where it traversed mainly rural areas. Damage in these areas was limited predominantly to trees and outbuildings.
EF0	N of Bradshaw	York	NE	41.6117°N 91.8329°W	2140–2141	0.07 mi (0.11 km)	45 yd (41 m)	$0	A brief tornado was observed by storm chasers; no damage resulted from the event.
EF0	S of Springville	Linn	IA	41.9625°N 91.3819°W	2140	0.5 mi (0.80 km)	50 yd (46 m)	$0	A brief tornado was observed by storm chasers; power to traffic lights was knocked out by the storm. The tornado was generated by the same storm that produced the 2020–2106 UTC EF1 tornado.
EF0	NNW of Swedehome	Polk	NE	41.2007°N 97.7065°W	2217–2218	0.4 mi (0.64 km)	45 yd (41 m)	$0	A brief tornado was observed by storm chasers; no damage resulted from the event.
EF2	Quapaw, OK to Baxter Springs, KS	Ottawa (OK), Cherokee (KS)	OK, KS	36.912°N 94.8215°W	2229–2242	11.37 mi (18.30 km)	325 yd (297 m)	$13,000,000	1 death – See section on this tornado – An additional 37 people were injured.
EF1	N of Octavia	Le Flore	OK	34.548°N 94.7109°W	2231–2234	1.5 mi (2.4 km)	250 yd (230 m)	$0	Many trees were downed along US 259. Surveyors were unable to access areas where the tornado likely touched down and dissipated and these portions of the track were estimated by NEXRAD Doppler weather radar.
EF2	N of Fort Scott to E of Pleasanton	Bourbon, Linn	KS	37.9269°N 94.7125°W	2240–2306	16.13 mi (25.96 km)	400 yd (370 m)	$500,000	The tornado touched down near Hammond, tossing grain bins and destroying several outbuildings before moving north-northeastward into Linn County. There, the tornado strengthened and destroyed an outdoor garage containing heavy equipment, nearly removing it from its foundation. An empty semi trailer was tossed over 200 yd (180 m) into a grove of trees and other vehicles were tossed around as well. It then destroyed a church that was built in the 1880s before dissipating in an open field. Numerous trees were downed along the path.
EF0	WSW of Milo	Vernon	MO	37.7302°N 94.3995°W	2315–2316	0.34 mi (550 m)	100 yd (91 m)	$0	A brief tornado touched down in a forested area and caused some damage to trees; inaccessibility prevented surveyors from directly assessing the event.
EF4	W of Ferndale to Mayflower/Vilonia to N of El Paso	Pulaski, Faulkner, White	AR	34.7787°N 92.652°W	0006–0102	41.1 mi (66.1 km)	1,320 yd (1,210 m)	$223,450,000	16 deaths – See article on this tornado – 193 people were injured.
EF2	SE of Joy to Center Hill to SSE of Mount Pisgah	White	AR	35.2491°N 91.9215°W	0116–0125	7.32 mi (11.78 km)	880 yd (800 m)	$1,400,000	Two manufactured homes, two barns, and a tractor shed were destroyed, a site-built home had its exterior walls collapsed, and a metal barn was leaned over. A site-built home and a few mobile homes sustained roof damage, and hundreds of trees were downed as well. One person was injured.
EF0	Steprock	White	AR	35.4236°N 91.674°W	0138–0140	1.64 mi (2.64 km)	250 yd (230 m)	$100,000	A brief tornado downed numerous trees, resulting in damage five homes.
EF1	NNW of Bare Stone to N of Denmark	White, Jackson	AR	35.4639°N 91.6414°W	0143–0149	5.28 mi (8.50 km)	100 yd (91 m)	$110,000	A farm building was destroyed, a home was damaged, and several trees were downed.
EF1	WNW of Union Hill	Independence	AR	35.5439°N 91.5524°W	0152–0153	0.84 mi (1.35 km)	50 yd (46 m)	$20,000	A brief tornado downed trees and power lines.
EF0	SW of Goodhope	Douglas	MO	36.91°N 92.81°W	0445–0450	0.88 mi (1.42 km)	100 yd (91 m)	$10,000	Several outbuildings were damaged and many trees were downed.

=== April 27 event (Washington) ===
List of confirmed tornadoes – Sunday, April 27, 2014
EF#	Location	County / Parish	State	Start Coord.	Time (UTC)	Path length	Max width	Damage	Summary
EF0	Eatonville	Pierce	WA	46.8649°N 122.2625°W	0030–0031	0.2 mi (0.32 km)	25 yd (23 m)	$5,000	A carport was destroyed, a garage was damaged, a power pole was left leaning, and a sign was damaged. A few structures lost shingles and siding was peeled back on one building. Trees were damaged and a garbage can was lofted into the trees.

=== April 28 event ===
List of confirmed tornadoes – Monday, April 28, 2014
EF#	Location	County / Parish	State	Start Coord.	Time (UTC)	Path length	Max width	Damage	Summary
EF2	Hosston to W of Plain Dealing	Caddo, Bossier	LA	32.8866°N 93.875°W	0809–0815	5.06 mi (8.14 km)	550 yd (500 m)	$1,020,000	A strong tornado caused minor damage to a house in Hosston before moving east. Another home sustained major roof damage, while a third was shifted off of its foundation. Numerous trees were snapped and uprooted along the path.
EF0	NE of Millington	Shelby	TN	35.3615°N 89.7486°W	1146–1148	1.54 mi (2.48 km)	75 yd (69 m)	$25,000	A short-lived tornado caused roof damage to homes and downed trees.
EF1	E of Sparta	White	TN	35.8808°N 85.2931°W	1737–1738	2.05 mi (3.30 km)	100 yd (91 m)	$30,000	Dozens of trees were snapped, and an occupied vehicle was thrown from a road. Several homes suffered minor damage and a grain silo was completely destroyed.
EF0	SE of Holy Bluff	Yazoo	MS	32.7526°N 90.6067°W	1857–1858	0.24 mi (0.39 km)	50 yd (46 m)	$0	A brief touchdown in an open field was reported by storm chasers.
EF3	SW of Tupelo to Bay Springs Lake	Lee, Itawamba, Prentiss	MS	34.2261°N 88.8242°W	1938–2020	30.97 mi (49.84 km)	440 yd (400 m)	$18,010,000	1 death – A large, multiple vortex wedge tornado moved through Tupelo, heavily damaging or destroying numerous homes and businesses. A four-story hotel sustained major damage, along with Joyner Elementary School and a maintenance shop. Extensive tree and power line damage occurred, and vehicles were flipped as well. 84 homes were destroyed in the Tupelo area, while 169 homes suffered major damage, and 351 other homes had minor damage. Six mobile homes were destroyed, nine mobile homes had major damage, while 6 others had minor damage. 17 businesses were destroyed, and 9 others suffered major damage. Major damage also occurred in rural areas outside of town, including at Elvis Presley Lake, where a 400-foot communication tower was toppled. Major damage continued in rural portions of Itawamba County, where 10 homes were destroyed, 29 homes suffered major damage, and 107 other homes had minor damage. 14 mobile homes were destroyed and 17 had major damage, while 30 other mobile homes suffered minor damage. Damage in Prentiss County was minor. 32 people were injured.
EF1	SSE of Winona to WSW of Kilmichael	Montgomery	MS	33.4039°N 89.6647°W	1951–1956	3.41 mi (5.49 km)	100 yd (91 m)	$70,000	One mobile home was destroyed, a second one was damaged, several homes sustained roof damage, and numerous trees were downed.
EF4	NE of Renfroe to Louisville	Leake, Neshoba, Attala, Winston	MS	32.8828°N 89.4308°W	2051–2147	33.39 mi (53.74 km)	1,320 yd (1,210 m)	$126,150,000	10 deaths – See the article on this tornado – 84 people were injured.
EF1	Northern Russellville	Franklin	AL	34.5219°N 87.7494°W	2056–2102	3.19 mi (5.13 km)	100 yd (91 m)	Unknown	A school complex sustained damage to its athletic fields. An elementary school awning was damaged, and a house sustained minor roof damage. Many trees were downed, some of which landed on homes and caused major structural damage.
EF3	SE of Rogersville to Athens	Limestone	AL	34.7753°N 87.2324°W	2147–2214	15.56 mi (25.04 km)	600 yd (550 m)	Unknown	2 deaths – A two-story condo was collapsed. A large, metal boat-storing building sustained EF2 damage, with a boat tossed 100 yd (91 m). Additional residences and condos had roof and exterior wall and siding damage, and several docks with metal protective coverings were destroyed. Several homes sustained damage, including an unanchored one that was pushed off its foundation, and a metal building was heavily damaged. A trailer park sustained EF2 damage, where two fatalities occurred. Numerous trees were snapped or uprooted, and several power poles were snapped. Thirty people were injured.
EF1	S of Vicksburg	Warren	MS	32.2835°N 90.8697°W	2156–2205	4.67 mi (7.52 km)	200 yd (180 m)	$400,000	Several trees were snapped or uprooted. Tin was pulled from a roof. One person was injured.
EF2	W of Union City, TN to W of Fulton, KY	Obion (TN), Fulton (KY)	TN, KY	36.4286°N 89.1416°W	2210–2227	12.08 mi (19.44 km)	150 yd (140 m)	$280,000	A total of eighteen structures were damaged by the tornado, mostly in Tennessee. Roofs were torn off and barns were destroyed. A machine shed sustained major damage, and a 700-pound weight was thrown 15 feet, a 40-pound jack was thrown 50 yards, and a steel trailer was bent. Significant tree damage occurred in Kentucky, and a church lost part of its roof. A barn was destroyed and a home sustained minor damage before the tornado dissipated. One person was injured.
EF1	N of Edwards to NNW of Clinton	Hinds	MS	32.3559°N 90.5975°W	2220–2242	13.75 mi (22.13 km)	500 yd (460 m)	$500,000	Several trees were snapped and uprooted and a fence was destroyed. A tin carport was destroyed and a significant amount of roofing material was torn off of a house.
EF1	SSW of Oktoc to NNW of Clinton	Noxubee, Oktibbeha	MS	33.23°N 88.79°W	2214–2229	7.11 mi (11.44 km)	100 yd (91 m)	$135,000	Several trees were snapped or uprooted.
EF0	NNW of Hamilton	Marion	AL	34.1854°N 87.998°W	2238–2253	7.72 mi (12.42 km)	100 yd (91 m)	$15,000	A building had shingles blown off, a shed was damaged, and numerous trees were downed; a tornado emergency was issued prior to the tornado at 2227 UTC.
EF1	Crawford	Lowndes	MS	33.3011°N 88.6286°W	2239–2241	0.64 mi (1.03 km)	100 yd (91 m)	$25,000	The roof of a mobile home was damaged and many trees were knocked down in town.
EF0	SE of Clinton	Hickman	KY	36.6537°N 88.8654°W	2246–2247	1.03 mi (1.66 km)	25 yd (23 m)	$2,000	A short-lived tornado downed large tree limbs.
EF1	NW of Utica area to WNW of Dry Grove	Hinds	MS	32.1229°N 90.6352°W	2248–2305	10.86 mi (17.48 km)	300 yd (270 m)	$500,000	Numerous trees and power lines were downed, with some damage to homes. A metal pole was blown through the side of a house and a small shed was also blown over. Another home suffered roof damage nearby. Tornado caused roof, siding, and skirting damage to some manufactured homes near the end of the path.
EF1	Hazel Green	Madison	AL	34.9476°N 86.6465°W	2250–2305	8.91 mi (14.34 km)	100 yd (91 m)	Unknown	Multiple homes in town sustained minor roof damage, a carport was collapsed, and hundreds of trees were downed, including an oak tree at a church that was believed to be around 150 years old.
EF2	NNE of Crawford to Columbus	Lowndes	MS	33.3664°N 88.538°W	2253–2315	10.31 mi (16.59 km)	300 yd (270 m)	$700,000	A strong wedge tornado destroyed a church along Highway 45 and caused significant damage to a well-constructed barn and several homes. Several power poles and hundreds of trees were snapped along the path of the storm. Irrigation pivots were flipped as well. Tornado dissipated at the south edge of Columbus.
EF2	NE of Wares Crossroads	Troup, Heard	GA	33.122°N 85.0556°W	2300–2310	5.7 mi (9.2 km)	150 yd (140 m)	$41,000	Four to six houses were damaged, and hundreds of hardwood trees were snapped or uprooted.
EF1	NW of Madison	Madison	MS	32.5141°N 90.1947°W	2300–2306	3.82 mi (6.15 km)	200 yd (180 m)	$450,000	Several tree limbs were snapped or downed. Shingle damage occurred to a home.
EF1	SE of Columbus to SSE of Steens	Lowndes	MS	33.49°N 88.39°W	2308–2319	6.35 mi (10.22 km)	250 yd (230 m)	$700,000	The tornado snapped and uprooted numerous trees. Falling trees caused damage to some roofs, and some outbuildings were also damaged.
EF2	SW of Flintville to NW of Huntland	Lincoln	TN	35.0186°N 86.4875°W	2309–2324	9.53 mi (15.34 km)	250 yd (230 m)	Unknown	Many trees were snapped and uprooted. The roof of an office building was blown off, two metal sheds were destroyed, and a metal silo was vaulted 150 yd (140 m). A mobile home was pushed off its foundation, and several single-family homes sustained minor roof damage.
EF0	SW of Canton	Madison	MS	32.5886°N 90.0994°W	2313–2314	0.8 mi (1.3 km)	75 yd (69 m)	$50,000	The tornado broke door and window glass at two homes, and caused shingle damage to several other homes. Several trees were knocked down as well.
EF1	SSE of Steens, MS to NW of Millport, AL	Lowndes (MS), Lamar (AL)	MS, AL	33.5251°N 88.3037°W	2319–2333	10.03 mi (16.14 km)	500 yd (460 m)	$500,000	In Mississippi, the tornado caused damage to a speedway, and several homes sustained roof and exterior damage. Dozens of trees were snapped and uprooted. In Alabama, numerous additional trees were snapped and uprooted, and several well-built homes sustained minor roof and exterior damage.
EF3	W of Richland to E of Pelahatchie	Hinds, Rankin, Scott	MS	32.2291°N 90.2225°W	2327–0015	29.72 mi (47.83 km)	400 yd (370 m)	$13,284,000	1 death – Several commercial and industrial buildings in Richland and Pearl were heavily damaged by this rain-wrapped tornado, a mobile home park in Pearl was severely damaged, and an auto dealership sustained significant roof damage. One metal frame industrial building was severely mangled. Numerous homes and several businesses all along the path sustained less severe EF1-strength damage, and Brandon Middle School's campus suffered minor damage; however, a gas station along Interstate 20 near Pelahatchie sustained significant damage shortly before the tornado dissipated. Many trees were downed along the path. The fatality occurred when a car was thrown 200 yards from Highway 49 in Richland. At least ten other people were injured. Tornado passed very close to the NWS Jackson radar site.
EF2	S of Columbus, MS to W of Shaw, AL	Lowndes (MS), Pickens (AL)	MS, AL	33.4382°N 88.4064°W	2338–0002	14.27 mi (22.97 km)	500 yd (460 m)	$500,000	Near the Mississippi–Alabama state line, two mobile homes were destroyed. Numerous trees were also downed, some of which landed on homes and outbuildings. In Alabama, several homes were damaged. One home was shifted off of its foundation, trapping ten people in the basement, five of whom suffered minor injuries. Several mobile homes were completely destroyed and one small concrete building had its roof torn off and one wall destroyed. Several roofs were damaged and trees uprooted near the end of the path.
EF1	Madden area	Leake	MS	32.6746°N 89.4246°W	0008–0019	5.05 mi (8.13 km)	100 yd (91 m)	$400,000	A chicken house was destroyed and three others were damaged. Two sheds were destroyed and the roof of a mobile home was damaged. Numerous trees were downed as well.
EF1	SE of Glen Allen to NW of Eldridge	Fayette, Marion	AL	33.8878°N 87.7094°W	0035–0048	6.97 mi (11.22 km)	350 yd (320 m)	$250,000	Several trees were snapped or uprooted. Several outbuildings were almost completely destroyed while others lost portions of their roofs.
EF3	E of Forest to WNW of Lake	Scott	MS	32.3703°N 89.4564°W	0038–0046	4.27 mi (6.87 km)	150 yd (140 m)	$700,000	A significant tornado destroyed a wood-frame home, leaving only interior walls standing and scattering the debris away from the foundation. Numerous trees were snapped and uprooted, and a chicken house was completely destroyed, with much debris carried away from the site. Three people were injured, one seriously.
EF1	NE of Lake to SW of Decatur	Newton	MS	32.3824°N 89.2825°W	0054–0110	9.57 mi (15.40 km)	150 yd (140 m)	$300,000	Trees were downed and homes sustained shingle damage. A chicken house sustained major damage as well.
EF3	SE of Belleview to SE of Lynchburg	Lincoln, Moore	TN	35.0066°N 86.5497°W	0109–0133	26.76 mi (43.07 km)	500 yd (460 m)	Unknown	2 deaths – See section on this tornado
EF2	S of Decatur	Newton	MS	32.4116°N 89.1147°W	0112–0131	5.59 mi (9.00 km)	400 yd (370 m)	$750,000	Several homes sustained significant roof damage, a cart shack at a country club was destroyed, and the golf course at the country club sustained extensive tree damage. Many other trees were downed elsewhere along the path.
EF1	S of Higdon to Shiloh	Jackson, DeKalb	AL	34.7945°N 85.6557°W	0118–0129	6.07 mi (9.77 km)	100 yd (91 m)	Unknown	A tornado caused mostly minor roof, carport, underpinning, and siding damage to multiple homes and mobile homes. Some outbuildings and a church were damaged as well. Numerous trees were snapped and uprooted along the path.
EF1	SSW of Duffee	Newton, Lauderdale	MS	32.4262°N 88.9417°W	0135–0155	13.11 mi (21.10 km)	100 yd (91 m)	$2,750,000	Damage from this tornado was primarily limited to snapped and uprooted trees, downed power lines, and some relatively minor damage to several structures.
EF1	Boldo area	Walker	AL	33.8344°N 87.1945°W	0140–0143	2.39 mi (3.85 km)	150 yd (140 m)	Unknown	Several trees were snapped and uprooted. Two homes sustained minor roof damage and a church sustained minor damage as well.
EF1	SE of York	Sumter	AL	32.4208°N 88.271°W	0230–0242	1.03 mi (1.66 km)	150 yd (140 m)	Unknown	Two well-built homes sustained significant roof damage and other structural damage. Several more homes sustained roof damage and several outbuildings were destroyed. A convenience store and local fire station were heavily damaged. Numerous trees were snapped and uprooted.
EF3	Welti to Berlin	Cullman	AL	34.0957°N 86.7598°W	0239–0258	8.88 mi (14.29 km)	350 yd (320 m)	Unknown	In Welti, the tornado snapped and uprooted numerous hardwood trees, heavily damaged a home, and completely destroyed a building that was under construction. A large travel trailer was also rolled, and damage in Welti was rated EF2. The tornado intensified to EF3 strength past Welti, snapping numerous trees and striking a chicken farm, where a well-built brick house had its top floor wiped away and blown several hundred feet into a ravine. Debris was embedded into nearby fields, and some trees on the property were mangled and partially debarked. A house lost its roof and numerous trees and power poles were downed further along the path. The tornado the re-intensified to high EF2/low EF3 strength as it significantly damaged a power substation. The tornado then struck another chicken farm at EF3 strength, obliterating several large metal chicken houses, with severe mangling of steel trusses noted. 25,000 chickens were killed in this one location. A mobile home was completely destroyed before the tornado abruptly dissipated.
EF3	SE of Sandersville	Jones, Wayne	MS	31.7420°N 89.0884°W	0240–0256	10.46 mi (16.83 km)	880 yd (800 m)	$1,850,000	Hundreds of trees were snapped and uprooted, with some denuded and partially debarked. A mobile home was destroyed, and a number of houses and additional mobile homes sustained heavy damage. A wood frame home was destroyed, with only some interior walls remaining. Fifteen people were injured.
EF1	NE of Little Sandy to S of Cottondale	Tuscaloosa	AL	33.0625°N 87.6345°W	0259–0320	12.47 mi (20.07 km)	1,500 yd (1,400 m)	Unknown	Numerous homes sustained minor shingle damage, and one home had part of its roof torn off. A small porch was ripped away from a double-wide mobile home, and hundreds of trees were downed, with several falling on and causing major damage to about 25 mobile homes. Thirteen people were injured.
EF1	Kimberly to S of Hayden	Jefferson, Blount	AL	33.7514°N 86.8303°W	0300–0320	8.78 mi (14.13 km)	800 yd (730 m)	Unknown	This tornado began near Interstate 65 and tracked northeast, snapping or uprooting hundreds of trees. The tornado moved directly through Kimberly, where several structures sustained varying degrees of damage, with the local fire department experiencing major damage. The most extensive damage occurred to the Kimberly Church of God where uplift of most of the roof structure resulted in exterior wall collapse. A large metal industrial building had one of its walls blown out as well. Four people were injured.
EF1	ENE of Cohutta, GA	Whitfield (GA), Bradley (TN)	GA, TN	34.951°N 84.8718°W	0305–0315	3.95 mi (6.36 km)	100 yd (91 m)	$120,000	A tornado caused a chicken coop to collapse, killing 16,000 chickens. A nearby farm building was also destroyed. The storm continued northeast into Tennessee where it shifted a home off its foundation before dissipating.
EF2	N of Waynesboro	Wayne	MS	31.7579°N 88.7559°W	0309–0320	9.2 mi (14.8 km)	250 yd (230 m)	$1,000,000	Several single-family houses and mobile homes sustained heavy damage or were destroyed.
EF2	Graysville	Jefferson	AL	33.5856°N 87.0055°W	0313–0323	5.46 mi (8.79 km)	1,800 yd (1,600 m)	Unknown	A strong wedge tornado snapped or uprooted numerous trees along its path. It caused significant damage to homes and businesses in Graysville, including one manufactured home that was destroyed and three others that sustained major damage. Near the Adamsville Parkway, two brick homes had exterior walls collapse while a manufactured home was damaged. Three people were injured.
EF1	NE of Brookwood to NW of Weller	Tuscaloosa, Jefferson	AL	33.3129°N 87.2197°W	0355–0404	4.46 mi (7.18 km)	675 yd (617 m)	Unknown	A tornado snapped and uprooted a number of trees. Minor tree damage occurred along the later part of the path.
EF1	SE of North Johns	Jefferson	AL	33.3162°N 87.111°W	0400–0419	7.62 mi (12.26 km)	913 yd (835 m)	Unknown	A tornado snapped and uprooted hundreds of trees.
EF2	Bessemer	Jefferson	AL	33.3592°N 86.995°W	0416–0425	5.14 mi (8.27 km)	600 yd (550 m)	Unknown	Hundreds of trees were uprooted or snapped, many of which fell on homes. The worst damage occurred at the municipal golf course, where the clubhouse was destroyed. Several homes and an apartment complex suffered roof damage.
EF1	NNW of Highland Lake	Blount	AL	33.8908°N 86.4871°W	0422–0435	7.81 mi (12.57 km)	1,000 yd (910 m)	Unknown	A few homes and buildings sustained largely minor damage, although one chicken barn and one older home were heavily impacted. Hay barns and outbuildings sustained significant damage, and numerous trees were snapped or uprooted.

=== April 29 event ===
List of reported tornadoes – Tuesday, April 29, 2014
EF#	Location	County / Parish	State	Start Coord.	Time (UTC)	Path length	Max width	Damage	Summary
EF1	SSE of Grove Hill	Clarke	AL	31.5759°N 87.7633°W	0515–0517	0.31 mi (0.50 km)	200 yd (180 m)	$5,000	Numerous trees were snapped and uprooted. Two homes and a barn sustained minor roof damage.
EF2	N of Springville	St. Clair, Blount	AL	33.7993°N 86.5395°W	0524–0543	14.6 mi (23.5 km)	1,300 yd (1,200 m)	Unknown	A home under construction was swept off its foundation thrown 50 yd (46 m) into a lake. A small utility trailer was thrown similar distances, a manufactured home was destroyed, and numerous trees were snapped or uprooted. Numerous additional homes sustained damage, including one that had its roof ripped off and walls collapsed. Two people were injured.
EF3	E of Sardis City to SE of Crossville	Etowah, DeKalb	AL	34.1703°N 86.0439°W	0532–0547	11.73 mi (18.88 km)	600 yd (550 m)	Unknown	A home was lifted off its block foundation and moved 60–80 ft (18–24 m), but its walls remained mostly intact. Several manufactured homes were destroyed and two others suffered significant damage to their roofs and exterior walls. A two-story home was destroyed with just a few interior walls left standing and the debris scattered hundreds of yards. A chicken house was completely destroyed. In DeKalb County near the Aroney community, a trailer home was completely destroyed with its undercarriage so mangled that it was nearly unrecognizable. Several other homes suffered significant roof damage further along the path, with one roof almost completely removed. A barn and an outbuilding were destroyed as well. Many trees were snapped and uprooted along the path, including a few that were debarked.
EF2	Northern Dawson	DeKalb	AL	34.3073°N 85.9305°W	0554–0600	2.47 mi (3.98 km)	200 yd (180 m)	Unknown	A strong tornado struck the north side of the small community of Dawson, where several homes and mobile homes sustained roof damage, and one home was severely damaged and lost most of its roof. Several large farm buildings were significantly damaged, and numerous trees were snapped and uprooted.
EF2	W of Fort Payne	DeKalb	AL	34.3491°N 85.8401°W	0606–0627	11.71 mi (18.85 km)	200 yd (180 m)	Unknown	A mobile home was separated from its undercarriage and completely destroyed, and other homes and mobile homes sustained roof and window damage. Numerous trees and power poles were snapped and along the path.
EF1	NW of Sardis City	Etowah	AL	34.0896°N 86.1550°W	0617–0627	6.28 mi (10.11 km)	200 yd (180 m)	Unknown	A tornado touched down, snapping and uprooting trees. One house was shifted off its foundation but suffered only minor roof damage. A wooden barn was heavily damaged as well. Several trailers were damaged with one losing its roof and a portion of its exterior walls, and another losing most of its roof and carport. A two-story house lost part of its roof covering.
EF0	Aroney to S of Kilpatrick	DeKalb	AL	34.2243°N 86.0781°W	0628–0632	2.42 mi (3.89 km)	75 yd (69 m)	Unknown	Tornado caused minor damage to homes, farm buildings, and trees.
EF1	S of Mentone to Lookout Mountain	DeKalb	AL	34.5048°N 85.6174°W	0636–0651	10.2 mi (16.4 km)	200 yd (180 m)	Unknown	South of Mentone, numerous trees were downed and outbuildings sustained minor damage. The tornado then struck Mentone, where only minor tree damage occurred. More severe tree damage occurred north of town before the tornado dissipated.
EF1	Pumpkin Center area	DeKalb	AL	34.4282°N 85.6466°W	0723–0725	1.05 mi (1.69 km)	200 yd (180 m)	Unknown	Numerous trees were snapped and uprooted, and a barn was leveled. Tin roofing from the barn was found 1/3 of a mile away.
EF0	SW of Society Hill	Macon	AL	32.4170°N 85.4585°W	0825–0827	1.74 mi (2.80 km)	75 yd (69 m)	Unknown	Society Hill Methodist Church sustained minor roof damage and numerous trees were uprooted.
EF3	NW of Crawford to Smiths Station	Russell, Lee	AL	32.4650°N 85.2336°W	0856–0912	11.45 mi (18.43 km)	1,200 yd (1,100 m)	Unknown	A tornado touched down northwest of Crawford and tracked northeast. Damage was initially confined to trees before it intensified. After crossing SR 169, it reached EF3 intensity and lifted six manufactured homes off their foundations and rolled them, completely destroying them. A two-story home nearby had its second floor destroyed. Three nearby wood frame homes were also lifted off their foundations and completely destroyed, with others sustaining roof damage. Hundreds of trees in the area were snapped or uprooted and some experienced debarking. Continuing northeast, dozens more homes sustained varying degrees of damage. The tornado later dissipated after crossing US 280 and causing minor tree damage in Smith's Station. Thirteen people were injured.
EF0	SW of Cove City	Craven	NC	35.17°N 77.35°W	1825–1826	0.04 mi (0.064 km)	25 yd (23 m)	$0	Tornado briefly touched down in an open field, causing no damage.
EF1	E of Stedman	Cumberland	NC	35.02°N 78.682°W	1952–1959	1.72 mi (2.77 km)	200 yd (180 m)	$50,000	Nearly a dozen homes sustained roof damage, ranging from loss of shingles to a single-wide mobile home that lost its entire roof. Dozens of trees were downed as well.
EF0	NNE of Conetoe	Edgecombe	NC	35.848°N 77.434°W	2209–2220	4.15 mi (6.68 km)	100 yd (91 m)	$25,000	Several mobile homes and outbuildings sustained minor damage, and numerous trees were downed as well.
EF0	NE of Shine	Greene	NC	35.441°N 77.7891°W	2349–2350	0.02 mi (0.032 km)	25 yd (23 m)	$0	Tornado briefly touched down in an open field, causing no damage.
EF1	SW of Hobbton	Sampson	NC	35.1491°N 78.3948°W	0010–0112	0.81 mi (1.30 km)	100 yd (91 m)	$355,000	Brief tornado leveled a hog house, caused roof damage to a home, and downed several trees.

=== April 30 event ===
List of confirmed tornadoes – Wednesday, April 30, 2014
EF#	Location	County / Parish	State	Start Coord.	Time (UTC)	Path length	Max width	Damage	Summary
EF1	S of Graceville	Jackson	FL	30.8785°N 85.5282°W	0644–0652	1.62 mi (2.61 km)	100 yd (91 m)	$200,000	Several homes were damaged and numerous trees were downed. One house was severely damaged when a large oak tree fell through it.
EF1	SE of Campbellton	Jackson	FL	30.8788°N 85.3641°W	0652–0700	4.61 mi (7.42 km)	150 yd (140 m)	$3,000	Numerous trees were downed.

== May ==
Confirmed tornadoes by Enhanced Fujita rating
EFU	EF0	EF1	EF2	EF3	EF4	EF5	Total
0	95	22	9	4	0	0	130

=== May 6 event ===
List of confirmed tornadoes – Tuesday, May 6, 2014
EF#	Location	County / Parish	State	Start Coord.	Time (UTC)	Path length	Max width	Damage	Summary	Refs
EF0	E of Midvale	Fremont	WY	43.2194°N 108.3833°W	2005–2009	4.79 mi (7.71 km)	30 yd (27 m)	$0	A brief tornado touched down over an open field.	
EF1	ENE of Midvale	Fremont	WY	43.2966°N 108.3367°W	2007–2010	1.52 mi (2.45 km)	50 yd (46 m)	$12,000	A brief tornado toppled a few power poles.	

=== May 7 event ===
List of confirmed tornadoes – Wednesday, May 7, 2014
EF#	Location	County / Parish	State	Start Coord.	Time (UTC)	Path length	Max width	Damage	Summary	Refs
EF0	SSE of Eden	Sweetwater	WY	41.905°N 109.3848°W	2108–2110	0.53 mi (0.85 km)	30 yd (27 m)	$0	A brief tornado touched down near U.S. Route 191.	
EF0	E of Platteville	Weld	CO	40.23°N 104.81°W	2115–2125	2.62 mi (4.22 km)	100 yd (91 m)	$0	A tornado touched down over open fields.	
EF0	SSE of Platner	Washington	CO	40.02°N 103.03°W	2205	0.1 mi (0.16 km)	50 yd (46 m)	$0	A tornado touched down over open fields.	
EF0	E of Akron	Washington	CO	40.13°N 103.08°W	2222–2230	5.46 mi (8.79 km)	100 yd (91 m)	$0	A tornado touched down over open fields.	
EF0	W of Holyoke	Phillips	CO	40.6°N 102.63°W	2325	0.1 mi (0.16 km)	50 yd (46 m)	$0	A tornado touched down over open fields.	
EF0	SSW of Burkburnett	Wichita	TX	34.033°N 98.602°W	0003–0004	0.2 mi (0.32 km)	75 yd (69 m)	$0	A brief tornado touched down over an open field.	
EF0	Wichita Mountains Wildlife Refuge	Comanche	OK	34.767°N 98.697°W	0006–0009	1.5 mi (2.4 km)	400 yd (370 m)	$0	Numerous trees were snapped or uprooted along the slopes of Moko Mountain.	

=== May 8 event ===
List of confirmed tornadoes – Thursday, May 8, 2014
EF#	Location	County / Parish	State	Start Coord.	Time (UTC)	Path length	Max width	Damage	Summary	Refs
EF0	NE of Ridgley	Barry	MO	36.7525°N 93.9845°W	1845–1850	2.39 mi (3.85 km)	50 yd (46 m)	$10,000	Numerous trees were snapped and uprooted.	
EF0	SW of Bagdad	Lincoln	CO	39.08°N 103.62°W	2110	0.1 mi (0.16 km)	50 yd (46 m)	$0	A tornado touched down over open fields.	
EF0	Cockrell Hill area	Dallas	TX	32.757°N 96.889°W	2015–2016	0.46 mi (0.74 km)	120 yd (110 m)	$80,000	A brief tornado caused minor damage to a warehouse in Cockrell Hill.	
EF0	SW of Hugo	Lincoln	CO	39.05°N 103.57°W	2127	0.1 mi (0.16 km)	50 yd (46 m)	$0	A tornado touched down over open fields.	
EF0	ENE Butterfield	Watonwan	MN	43.9552°N 94.6083°W	2151–2154	0.83 mi (1.34 km)	50 yd (46 m)	$0	A brief tornado touched down over open fields.	
EF0	NNE of Madelia	Watonwan, Brown, Blue Earth	MN	44.1073°N 94.379°W	2209–2213	2.1 mi (3.4 km)	50 yd (46 m)	$1,000	A brief tornado caused minor damage.	
EF1	NW of Ava	Douglas	MO	36.9964°N 92.7143°W	2210–2215	2.5 mi (4.0 km)	100 yd (91 m)	$15,000	Numerous trees were snapped and powerlines were downed. A barn was destroyed and a highway sign was damaged	
EF0	W of Frost	Navarro	TX	32.08°N 96.84°W	2222	Unknown	Unknown	$0	A tornado briefly touched down and was photographed by a spotter.	
EF1	SE of Taral	Pope	AR	35.3094°N 93.1162°W	0144–0147	1.66 mi (2.67 km)	50 yd (46 m)	$250,000	A tornado overturned a mobile home and destroyed a chicken house.	

=== May 10 event ===
List of confirmed tornadoes – Saturday, May 10, 2014
EF#	Location	County / Parish	State	Start Coord.	Time (UTC)	Path length	Max width	Damage	Summary	Refs
EF0	NW of Monteview	Jefferson	ID	43.9914°N 112.6153°W	1747–1753	0.02 mi (0.032 km)	15 yd (14 m)	$0	A brief tornado touched down over open fields.	
EF1	E of Black	Geneva	AL	31.0012°N 85.6421°W	2007–2016	2.15 mi (3.46 km)	100 yd (91 m)	$85,000	A house sustained considerable damage and metal barn was destroyed. Support beams at the barn were blown over, which resulted in concrete footings being pulled out of the ground at that location.	
EF2	N of Sibley to Orrick to SW of Henrietta	Jackson, Ray	MO	39.2125°N 94.1701°W	2215–2255	12.63 mi (20.33 km)	500 yd (460 m)	Unknown	See section on this tornado	
EF0	N of Lexington	Ray	MO	39.2118°N 93.8694°W	2300–2302	0.64 mi (1.03 km)	25 yd (23 m)	$0	Brief tornado caused no damage.	
EF1	NNE of Marshall	Saline	MO	39.1665°N 93.172°W	0026–0043	7.27 mi (11.70 km)	1,350 yd (1,230 m)	$10,000	Large wedge tornado damaged trees, power lines, and farm structures.	
EF0	NW of Severy	Greenwood	KS	37.6598°N 96.2804°W	0116–0117	0.08 mi (0.13 km)	75 yd (69 m)	$0	Rope tornado touched down in an open field, causing no damage.	

=== May 11 event ===
List of confirmed tornadoes – Sunday, May 11, 2014
EF#	Location	County / Parish	State	Start Coord.	Time (UTC)	Path length	Max width	Damage	Summary	Refs
EF0	WNW of Deweese	Clay	NE	40.3824°N 98.2745°W	2026–2027	0.07 mi (0.11 km)	150 yd (140 m)	$0	Tornado briefly touched down in a field, causing no damage.	
EF3	NNW of Fairfield to S of Saronville to NE of Sutton	Clay, Fillmore	NE	40.4926°N 98.1207°W	2050–2128	20.21 mi (32.52 km)	1,300 yd (1,200 m)	$14,000,000	See section on this tornado	
EF0	NW of Charleston	Lee	IA	40.6059°N 91.5592°W	2124	0.1 mi (0.16 km)	30 yd (27 m)	$0	Brief tornado snapped tree limbs.	
EF2	NW of Grafton to N of Fairmont	Fillmore	NE	40.6638°N 97.7309°W	2125–2141	9.38 mi (15.10 km)	750 yd (690 m)	$3,500,000	A home was shifted 30 ft (9.1 m) off its foundation, and another lost part of its roof. Grain bins were destroyed and irrigation pivots were overturned. Widespread tree and power pole damage occurred.	
EF0	S of Grafton	Fillmore	NE	40.6185°N 97.6994°W	2125–2126	0.04 mi (0.064 km)	100 yd (91 m)	$0	Brief anticyclonic tornado remained over open fields with no damage.	
EF1	NW of Fairmont to NW of Exeter	Fillmore	NE	40.6424°N 97.5922°W	2140–2148	6.2 mi (10.0 km)	150 yd (140 m)	$150,000	Anticyclonic tornado pushed an outbuilding and a grain bin off of their foundations, and the roof of another outbuilding was partially blown off. Numerous irrigation pivots were overturned, a home sustained minor roof damage, and extensive tree damage occurred.	
EF3	N of Exeter to Beaver Crossing to S of Goehner	Fillmore, York, Seward	NE	40.6922°N 97.4531°W	2157–2228	19.14 mi (30.80 km)	2,640 yd (2,410 m)	$11,400,000	See section on this tornado	
EF0	E of McCool Junction	York	NE	40.7501°N 97.3875°W	2204–2206	0.61 mi (0.98 km)	25 yd (23 m)	$0	Satellite tornado moved southwest and merged with the main Beaver Crossing EF3 tornado, causing no damage.	
EF0	NW of Beaver Crossing	Seward	NE	40.79°N 97.29°W	2213–2219	1.71 mi (2.75 km)	100 yd (91 m)	$0	Another satellite of the Beaver Crossing EF3 tornado caused minor tree damage.	
EF2	E of Beaver Crossing	Seward	NE	40.77°N 97.2°W	2223–2238	7.96 mi (12.81 km)	500 yd (460 m)	Unknown	Tornado rapidly developed after the initial Beaver Crossing EF3 tornado dissipated. Large outbuildings were completely destroyed, trees were snapped, power lines were downed, and a semi-truck was flipped.	
EF2	S of Garland	Seward	NE	40.872°N 97.0351°W	2253–2305	4.67 mi (7.52 km)	500 yd (460 m)	Unknown	Multiple homes were impacted, including one that had its roof torn off. Large, well-constructed outbuildings were destroyed, and extensive tree and power line damage occurred.	
EF1	E of McCool Junction to N of Beaver Crossing	York, Seward	NE	40.7407°N 97.3808°W	2258–2310	5.55 mi (8.93 km)	700 yd (640 m)	$60,000	Irrigation pivots were overturned, grain bins were destroyed, and power poles were snapped. Outbuildings were destroyed and tree damage occurred as well.	
EF1	NW of Malcolm	Lancaster	NE	40.9211°N 96.9135°W	2307–2313	3 mi (4.8 km)	400 yd (370 m)	Unknown	Tornado completely destroyed several outbuildings and damaged the roof of a house at a farmstead. Trees were snapped and a hay bale was thrown nearly one half-mile.	
EF2	N of Raymond	Lancaster	NE	40.97°N 96.7955°W	2311–2320	2.5 mi (4.0 km)	300 yd (270 m)	Unknown	A house near the beginning of the path sustained structural damage, and a well-built garage was destroyed with a nearby camper being rolled over 100 yards. Several farmsteads were hit, including one where the roof was partially removed from the farmhouse, farm machinery was tossed, and every outbuilding on the property was destroyed. Trees were uprooted as well.	
EF1	S of Frizell	Pawnee	KS	38.1383°N 99.2157°W	2312–2318	2.5 mi (4.0 km)	300 yd (270 m)	Unknown	Multiple-vortex tornado remained over rural areas, causing tree damage and overturning irrigation sprinkler pivots.	
EF1	WNW of Raymond	Lancaster	NE	40.959°N 96.7986°W	2320–2330	5.27 mi (8.48 km)	280 yd (260 m)	Unknown	The roof was torn off of an outbuilding and tree damage occurred.	
EF0	E of Ceresco	Saunders	NE	41.0609°N 96.6082°W	2342–2345	1.8 mi (2.9 km)	200 yd (180 m)	Unknown	Tornado remained over open country and caused no damage.	
EF0	E of Ardell	Edwards	KS	37.8772°N 99.4722°W	2344–2345	0.75 mi (1.21 km)	25 yd (23 m)	$0	Brief, weak tornado.	
EF1	SE of Daykin to NE of Swanton	Jefferson, Saline	NE	40.2988°N 97.2741°W	2355–0015	15.5 mi (24.9 km)	500 yd (460 m)	Unknown	A church, a home, and a farmstead sustained minor damage near the beginning of the path. Extensive tree damage occurred as the tornado struck Swanton, and minor structural damage occurred in town as well. A modular home sustained roof damage before the tornado dissipated. One person was injured.	
EF1	SW of Waterloo to S of Elkhorn	Saunders, Douglas	NE	41.1632°N 96.3776°W	2359–0025	10.7 mi (17.2 km)	800 yd (730 m)	Unknown	Tornado touched down near the Two Rivers State Recreation Area. Numerous trees were toppled, some of which caused damage to homes and vehicles. Homes in the Elk Valley subdivision sustained shingle damage.	
EF1	NW of Elkhorn to S of Bennington	Douglas	NE	41.2989°N 96.254°W	0021–0027	5.16 mi (8.30 km)	200 yd (180 m)	Unknown	Tornado moved through several subdivisions. Numerous trees and power poles were downed, and homes sustained roof and garage door damage. One home lost a large section of its roof. A farm shed was damaged before the tornado dissipated.	
EF0	N of Spink	Union	SD	42.8713°N 96.7332°W	0032–0038	2.5 mi (4.0 km)	50 yd (46 m)	$20,000	A two-story garage lost part of one of its second story walls, a hog barn was damaged, and the top of a grain bin was ripped off. Tree damage occurred as well.	
EF1	ESE of Middleburg	Sioux	IA	43.0973°N 96.0144°W	0135–0146	4 mi (6.4 km)	100 yd (91 m)	$3,000,000	Three farmsteads were damaged, with a house sustaining damage at one of them. Structures and vehicles sustained considerable damage at a dairy farm.	
EF0	NE of Hudson	Stafford	KS	38.1762°N 98.5622°W	0144–0148	3.43 mi (5.52 km)	50 yd (46 m)	$0	Tornado moved through open fields, causing no damage.	
EF0	NNE of Newkirk	Sioux	IA	43.1031°N 95.9293°W	0150–0152	0.86 mi (1.38 km)	50 yd (46 m)	$0	Tornado remained over open country and caused no damage.	
EF0	E of Sheldon	O'Brien	IA	43.178°N 95.814°W	0159–0201	0.86 mi (1.38 km)	50 yd (46 m)	$5,000	Tree damage occurred and a vehicle was damaged by flying debris.	
EF0	ESE of Springvale	Pratt	KS	37.5155°N 98.9246°W	0203–0206	4.6 mi (7.4 km)	50 yd (46 m)	$0	Weak tornado caused no damage.	
EF0	SW of Sterling	Rice	KS	38.191°N 98.2257°W	0212–0213	0.42 mi (0.68 km)	50 yd (46 m)	$0	Brief tornado caused no damage	
EF0	NW of Sterling	Rice	KS	38.2345°N 98.2205°W	0220–0222	1.02 mi (1.64 km)	50 yd (46 m)	$0	Tornado caused power flashes but no noticeable damage.	
EF2	SSW of Guthrie Center to ESE of Fanslers	Guthrie	IA	41.6108°N 94.5128°W	0243–0248	10.34 mi (16.64 km)	240 yd (220 m)	$1,300,000	A large condominium building was severely damaged, losing its roof and many of its second floor walls. Numerous trees were snapped and barns were damaged as well.	
EF0	NNW of Inman	McPherson	KS	38.2951°N 97.789°W	0251–0253	1.25 mi (2.01 km)	75 yd (69 m)	$0	Tornado caused power flashes but no noticeable damage.	
EF0	WSW of Inman	McPherson	KS	38.2239°N 97.8003°W	0254–0256	0.68 mi (1.09 km)	50 yd (46 m)	$0	Brief tornado caused no damage.	
EF1	E of Fanslers	Guthrie	IA	41.7239°N 94.4243°W	0256–0303	4.33 mi (6.97 km)	190 yd (170 m)	$400,000	Trees were uprooted, including one that crushed a car.	
EF0	E of McPherson	McPherson	KS	38.363°N 97.6304°W	0305–0308	1.13 mi (1.82 km)	75 yd (69 m)	$0	Brief tornado caused no damage.	
EF0	N of Dallas Center	Dallas	IA	41.7351°N 93.9776°W	0321–0327	5.91 mi (9.51 km)	100 yd (91 m)	$100,000	Farm buildings were damaged.	
EF0	SW of Napier	Boone	IA	41.9471°N 93.7634°W	0344–0346	1.68 mi (2.70 km)	100 yd (91 m)	$25,000	A short-lived tornado caused minor damage to a farmstead.	

=== May 12 event ===
List of confirmed tornadoes – Monday, May 12, 2014
EF#	Location	County / Parish	State	Start Coord.	Time (UTC)	Path length	Max width	Damage	Summary	Refs
EF0	SW of Shawville	Lorain	OH	41.3474°N 82.0332°W	2345–2350	1.02 mi (1.64 km)	100 yd (91 m)	$75,000	Tornado remained mainly over farmland. Several trees were downed and a few buildings sustained minor roof damage. Downgraded from EF1 to EF0 post-survey.	
EF0	WNW of Poe	Medina	OH	41.086°N 81.864°W	0015–0017	0.21 mi (0.34 km)	40 yd (37 m)	$25,000	Homes and businesses sustained minor roof and fascia damage.	

=== May 14 event ===
List of confirmed tornadoes – Wednesday, May 14, 2014
EF#	Location	County / Parish	State	Start Coord.	Time (UTC)	Path length	Max width	Damage	Summary	Refs
EF0	SSW of Mount Washington	Bullitt	KY	37.9318°N 85.5882°W	1823–1827	1.5 mi (2.4 km)	50 yd (46 m)	$15,000	A short-lived tornado snapped many tree limbs and caused minor structural damage	
EF0	W of Perote	Bullock	AL	31.9493°N 85.7406°W	1918–1920	0.87 mi (1.40 km)	200 yd (180 m)	$0	A brief tornado damaged several trees	
EF0	SE of Alexander City	Tallapoosa	AL	32.903°N 85.9304°W	1921–1925	1.89 mi (3.04 km)	150 yd (140 m)	$0	A short-lived tornado uprooted numerous trees and caused minor structural damage	
EF0	NNW of Millerville	Clay	AL	33.2496°N 85.949°W	2028–2029	0.1 mi (0.16 km)	30 yd (27 m)	$0	A brief tornado damaged or uprooted 25–30 trees.	
EF0	WNW of Letan	Box Butte	NE	42.07°N 103.24°W	2030–2035	0.78 mi (1.26 km)	40 yd (37 m)	$0	A weak landspout touched down west of Kilpatrick Lake.	
EF2	NE of Hopkinsville	Christian	KY	36.9142°N 87.4512°W	2136–2140	3.74 mi (6.02 km)	150 yd (140 m)	$100,000	A half-dozen homes sustained minor to moderate damage. Two pole barns were destroyed. Portable storage buildings were moved 20–25 yd (18–23 m). Numerous trees were snapped and uprooted.	
EF3	SE of Cedarville	Greene	OH	39.6808°N 83.8480°W	2144–2203	8.93 mi (14.37 km)	400 yd (370 m)	$500,000	The tornado touched down near Cedarville, damaging a home and a camper. A nearby farmstead was impacted, where a barn lost a large section of its roof and a few walls were collapsed. Several fences and outbuildings were completely destroyed, and another home had its windows blown out with significant roof damage. A trailer was flipped over and a detached garage was completely destroyed. A pickup truck was picked up and dragged about 75 yd (69 m) away into a field from the garage, and a lawn tractor was thrown several hundred yards. A farmstead in the direct path of the tornado sustained significant damage, where the poorly anchored farmhouse completely collapsed, with very few interior walls remaining. Healthy hardwood trees on the property were debarked and denuded. Several barns were completely destroyed and several grain silos were thrown up to one-half mile away. Another home lost sections of its roof and walls and was completely spattered with mud before the tornado rapidly weakened and dissipated.	
EF0	Eastman area	Dodge	GA	32.1861°N 83.1767°W	0349–0354	1.72 mi (2.77 km)	100 yd (91 m)	$50,000	An anticyclonic tornado touched down near the Dodge County Hospital, causing minor damage. Moderate damage occurred in the town of Eastman, with a few structures losing their roof.	
EF1	N of Homer	Banks	GA	34.3542°N 83.5003°W	0403–0413	7.75 mi (12.47 km)	200 yd (180 m)	$50,000	A tornado moved through mostly wooded areas, causing extensive tree damage. A few homes had minor roof damage along the path as well.	

=== May 15 event ===
List of confirmed tornadoes – Thursday, May 15, 2014
EF#	Location	County / Parish	State	Start Coord.	Time (UTC)	Path length	Max width	Damage	Summary	Refs
EF0	SSW of Charlotte	Mecklenburg	NC	35.1361°N 80.9180°W	1046–1047	0.67 mi (1.08 km)	30 yd (27 m)	$10,000	The tornado removed siding from one industrial building and tore away a glass panel from a second. A large awning was thrown or rolled. Numerous trees were downed.	
EF1	NW of Bass	Columbia	FL	30.1615°N 82.7894°W	1315–1317	0.40 mi (0.64 km)	50 yd (46 m)	Unknown	Numerous trees were snapped or uprooted. An outbuilding lost a large portion of its tin roof.	
EF0	Doral area	Miami-Dade	FL	25.7858°N 80.3288°W	1830–1833	0.27 mi (0.43 km)	30 yd (27 m)	Unknown	A tornado touched down west of Miami International Airport and tracked east-northeast. Street signs, trees, and a vehicle were damaged along its path.	
EF1	SW of Durham	Durham	NC	35.9538°N 78.9347°W	2210–2213	0.76 mi (1.22 km)	150 yd (140 m)	$250,000	Dozens of trees were snapped or uprooted and approximately 40 homes sustained roof or structural damage, mainly from downed trees.	
EF0	Lock Haven area	Clinton	PA	41.133°N 77.431°W	2303–2304	0.32 mi (0.51 km)	100 yd (91 m)	$5,000	Part of a warehouse roof was lifted, allowing part of the wall to collapse inward. The chimney of one house was toppled and a carport was lifted and thrown into another house. Large trees and tree limbs were snapped.	

=== May 16 event ===
List of confirmed tornadoes – Friday, May 16, 2014
EF#	Location	County / Parish	State	Start Coord.	Time (UTC)	Path length	Max width	Damage	Summary	Refs
EF0	SSE of Sunny Bank	Loudoun	VA	38.9626°N 77.6952°W	0731–0735	0.5 mi (0.80 km)	75 yd (69 m)	$5,000	Trees were damaged.	

=== May 18 event ===
List of confirmed tornadoes – Sunday, May 18, 2014
EF#	Location	County / Parish	State	Start Coord.	Time (UTC)	Path length	Max width	Damage	Summary	Refs
EF0	NW of Belle Creek Airport	Powder River	MT	45.16°N 105.16°W	2350–0000	0.1 mi (0.16 km)	25 yd (23 m)	$0	A brief tornado touched down over an open field.	
EF0	SSE of Agate	Sioux	NE	42.01°N 103.45°W	0035–0040	2.07 mi (3.33 km)	30 yd (27 m)	$0	A brief tornado touched down over an open field.	
EF0	SW of Berea	Box Butte	NE	42.1°N 103.15°W	0120–0130	6.18 mi (9.95 km)	30 yd (27 m)	$0	A tornado touched down over an open field.	

=== May 20 event ===
List of confirmed tornadoes – Tuesday, May 20, 2014
EF#	Location	County / Parish	State	Start Coord.	Time (UTC)	Path length	Max width	Damage	Summary	Refs
EF0	South Morrill area	Scotts Bluff	NE	45.16°N 105.16°W	2325–2330	0.68 mi (1.09 km)	25 yd (23 m)	$0	A brief tornado touched down over an open field.	

=== May 21 event ===
List of confirmed tornadoes – Wednesday, May 21, 2014
EF#	Location	County / Parish	State	Start Coord.	Time (UTC)	Path length	Max width	Damage	Summary	Refs
EF0	SW of Elko	Elko	NV	40.8515°N 115.7414°W	1938–1940	0.23 mi (0.37 km)	25 yd (23 m)	$0	Tornado left some debris stuck in a fence.	
EF0	Elko	Elko	NV	40.8362°N 115.7832°W	1948–1954	0.26 mi (0.42 km)	125 yd (114 m)	$2,000	Tornado struck Elko, uprooting a large tree and snapping off tree limbs. A car wash had shingles torn off and several shopping carts were thrown into the air, one of which was slammed into the back of a car.	
EF0	Buckley Air Force Base area	Arapahoe	CO	39.7°N 104.81°W	2005–2010	0.1 mi (0.16 km)	50 yd (46 m)	$0	Brief tornado caused no damage.	
EF0	NE of Aurora	Adams	CO	39.7607°N 104.8101°W	2030	0.1 mi (0.16 km)	50 yd (46 m)	$0	Brief tornado caused no damage.	
EF0	N of Watkins	Adams	CO	39.75°N 104.60°W	2045	0.1 mi (0.16 km)	50 yd (46 m)	$0	Brief tornado caused no damage.	
EF0	ENE of Byers	Arapahoe	CO	39.73°N 104.17°W	2220–2225	0.1 mi (0.16 km)	50 yd (46 m)	$0	Tornado reported on the ground for at least five minutes. Remained over open country and caused no damage.	
EF0	SW of Gold Acres	Lander	NV	40.21°N 116.93°W	2330–2335	0.24 mi (0.39 km)	50 yd (46 m)	$0	Tornado occurred in a rugged area with no noticeable damage.	
EF0	NE of Strasburg	Adams	CO	39.87°N 104.04°W	2306	0.1 mi (0.16 km)	50 yd (46 m)	$0	Brief tornado caused no damage.	
EF0	NW of American Falls	Power	ID	42.8465°N 113.0487°W	0040–0100	3 mi (4.8 km)	20 yd (18 m)	$1,000	Trees were uprooted and limbs were snapped off, and irrigation lines were damaged. A house had shingles torn off, and a shed door was torn off as well.	
EF0	N of Wheatland	Platte	WY	42.2021°N 105.0049°W	0115–0120	0.94 mi (1.51 km)	25 yd (23 m)	$0	Tornado touched down and lifted four times near Interstate 25, causing no damage.	

=== May 22 event ===
List of confirmed tornadoes – Thursday, May 22, 2014
EF#	Location	County / Parish	State	Start Coord.	Time (UTC)	Path length	Max width	Damage	Summary	Refs
EF0	ESE of Mosca	Alamosa	CO	37.5979°N 105.613°W	1845–1850	0.3 mi (0.48 km)	25 yd (23 m)	$0	A brief tornado touched down over an open field.	
EF3	NW of Duanesburg to NW of Knox	Schenectady, Albany	NY	42.82°N 74.19°W	1933–1955	7 mi (11 km)	440 yd (400 m)	Unknown	Numerous homes, barns, and vehicles were damaged, with one house being destroyed along U.S. Highway 20, with only a few walls left standing. The roof of a motel was damaged and a trailer was flipped. Trees and power lines were downed as well.	
EF1	ESE of Marydel	Kent	DE	39.098°N 75.667°W	2054–2055	0.35 mi (560 m)	50 yd (46 m)	$150,000	Approximately 15 homes were damaged and two people were injured.	
EF0	NE of Prince George	Prince George	VA	37.26°N 77.24°W	2145–2146	0.69 mi (1.11 km)	25 yd (23 m)	$25,000	A brief tornado destroyed a shed, caused minor damage to a house, and snapped trees.	
EF0	E of Powcan	King and Queen	VA	37.78°N 76.94°W	2205–2206	0.85 mi (1.37 km)	50 yd (46 m)	$5,000	A brief tornado down numerous trees.	
EF0	NW of Waverly	Sussex	VA	37.05°N 77.10°W	2220–2221	1.38 mi (2.22 km)	100 yd (91 m)	$25,000	A NAPA store and a church sustained minor damage, homes suffered broken windows and damaged siding, and numerous trees were downed, a few of which caused damage at a cemetery.	

=== May 23 event ===
List of confirmed tornadoes – Friday, May 23, 2014
EF#	Location	County / Parish	State	Start Coord.	Time (UTC)	Path length	Max width	Damage	Summary	Refs
EF0	S of Casper	Natrona	WY	42.7319°N 106.4228°W	1935–1945	2 mi (3.2 km)	40 yd (37 m)	$0	Tornado made two touchdowns and was reported by spotters and law enforcement.	
EF0	NW of Jal	Lea	NM	32.2718°N 103.4672°W	0105–0108	3.65 yd (3.34 m)	300 yd (270 m)	$0	Brief tornado that touched down twice.	

=== May 24 event ===
List of confirmed tornadoes – Saturday, May 24, 2014
EF#	Location	County / Parish	State	Start Coord.	Time (UTC)	Path length	Max width	Damage	Summary	Refs
EF0	NNE of Cowley	Big Horn	WY	44.9217°N 108.443°W	2036–2044	0.77 mi (1.24 km)	20 yd (18 m)	$0	Sighted by spotters near the airport.	
EF0	WNW of Ozona	Crockett	TX	30.9255°N 101.8355°W	2221–2223	0.12 mi (0.19 km)	50 yd (46 m)	$0	Brief touchdown on top of a ridge.	

=== May 25 event ===
List of confirmed tornadoes – Sunday, May 25, 2014
EF#	Location	County / Parish	State	Start Coord.	Time (UTC)	Path length	Max width	Damage	Summary	Refs
EF0	ESE of Florissant	Teller	CO	38.9285°N 105.2666°W	1739–1742	0.08 mi (130 m)	25 yd (23 m)	$0	A brief tornado that caused no damage.	
EF0	NW of Longfellow	Pecos	TX	30.3808°N 102.8741°W	1845–1847	1.16 mi (1.87 km)	200 yd (180 m)	$0	Brief landspout tornado with no damage.	

=== May 26 event ===
List of confirmed tornadoes – Monday, May 26, 2014
EF#	Location	County / Parish	State	Start Coord.	Time (UTC)	Path length	Max width	Damage	Summary	Refs
EF0	E of Cedar Creek	Bastrop	TX	30.0941°N 97.4599°W	1646–1647	0.5 mi (0.80 km)	30 yd (27 m)	$10,000	A brief tornado caused minor damage to single home.	
EF0	WNW of Ludlow	Aroostook	ME	46.1478°N 67.9915°W	1750–1751	0.23 mi (0.37 km)	180 yd (160 m)	$0	Several trees were either split or uprooted.	
EF0	SW of Patricia	Martin	TX	32.4985°N 102.1052°W	2038–2039	0.6 mi (0.97 km)	200 yd (180 m)	$0	Brief tornado caused no damage.	
EF0	W of Sinton	San Patricio	TX	28.0553°N 97.6463°W	2120–2122	0.12 mi (0.19 km)	50 yd (46 m)	$0	A brief tornado touched down over a farm and caused no damage.	
EF2	NW of Coahoma	Howard	TX	32.2946°N 101.2859°W	2238–2241	1.01 mi (1.63 km)	400 yd (370 m)	$45,000	A 78,000 lb (35,000 kg) pumpjack (including the concrete base and piping) was overturned. The track could not be determined due to abundant rainfall, wet soil, and lack of vegetation.	
EF0	SW of Smyer	Hockley	TX	33.5125°N 102.1983°W	2252–2259	2.05 mi (3.30 km)	30 yd (27 m)	$500	Tornado caused roof damage to an outbuilding.	
EF0	WNW of Garden City	Glasscock	TX	31.8935°N 101.5937°W	2257–2300	1.13 mi (1.82 km)	500 yd (460 m)	$0	Multiple-vortex tornado remained over open country and caused no damage.	
EF0	E of Garden City	Glasscock	TX	31.87°N 101.3807°W	2326–2327	0.67 mi (1.08 km)	200 yd (180 m)	$0	Brief rain-wrapped tornado caused no damage.	
EF0	E of Garden City	Glasscock	TX	31.8462°N 101.3554°W	2342–2343	0.79 mi (1.27 km)	300 yd (270 m)	$0	Brief tornado caused no damage.	
EF2	S of Watford City	McKenzie	ND	47.71°N 103.28°W	0046–0056	0.46 mi (0.74 km)	100 yd (91 m)	$2,500,000	Brief, but strong tornado moved through an oil refinery workers' trailer park, with thirteen camper trailers being destroyed and two others being damaged. One of the trailers was flipped and had its frame thrown about 120 feet (37 m). In addition, a wooden power pole was snapped, and both wooden and metal fences were damaged, along with over a dozen vehicles, one of which was moved about 60 feet (18 m) and flipped over onto its roof. Nine people were injured by the tornado.	
EF0	WSW of Sterling City	Sterling	TX	31.72°N 101.2102°W	2347–2349	0.22 mi (0.35 km)	40 yd (37 m)	$0	Tornado remained over open country and caused no damage.	

=== May 27 event ===
List of confirmed tornadoes – Tuesday, May 27, 2014
EF#	Location	County / Parish	State	Start Coord.	Time (UTC)	Path length	Max width	Damage	Summary	Refs
EF0	SE of Nuyaka	Okmulgee	OK	35.6111°N 96.0689°W	1738	0.3 mi (0.48 km)	50 yd (46 m)	$5,000	A brief tornado snapped tree limbs and moved a trailer.	
EF0	W of Ringling	Jefferson	OK	34.18°N 97.6775°W	1855	0.1 mi (0.16 km)	30 yd (27 m)	$0	Tornado confirmed via photograph.	
EF0	NE of Faxon	Comanche	OK	34.51°N 98.49°W	1900–1902	0.12 mi (0.19 km)	50 yd (46 m)	$0	A brief tornado caused minor damage to furniture and an outbuilding.	
EF0	NNW of Silver City	Pennington	SD	44.113°N 103.593°W	1917–1928	2.16 mi (3.48 km)	200 yd (180 m)	$0	A brief tornado snapped trees	
EF1	E of Alice	Jim Wells	TX	27.7519°N 98.0538°W	2330–2340	2.34 mi (3.77 km)	550 yd (500 m)	$1,600,000	This tornado produced shingle damage to the roof tops of several homes, lifted the roof deck off of several homes, and snapped a dozen power poles at their midpoint. The tornado also destroyed a metal building and a portable building, broke overhead doors, blew off the siding of several metal buildings, and downed numerous trees.	
EF1	Premont area	Jim Wells	TX	27.3649°N 98.1278°W	0045–0052	5.26 mi (8.47 km)	650 yd (590 m)	$250,000	One tree was uprooted, numerous tree limbs were snapped, and homes sustained roof damage in town. Numerous power poles were snapped outside of town as well.	

=== May 28 event ===
List of confirmed tornadoes – Wednesday, May 28, 2014
EF#	Location	County / Parish	State	Start Coord.	Time (UTC)	Path length	Max width	Damage	Summary	Refs
EF1	S of Lions	St. John the Baptist	LA	30.0389°N 90.5975°W	1032–1034	2.55 mi (4.10 km)	75 yd (69 m)	Unknown	A tornado damaged a firehouse and snapped several trees and power poles nearby. An oil refinery sustained some damage as well.	
EF0	NNE of Le Roy	McLean	IL	40.3673°N 88.7569°W	1747–1750	0.2 mi (0.32 km)	50 yd (46 m)	$0	A brief tornado touched down over an open field	
EF0	SE of Panola	Woodford	IL	40.7632°N 89.0007°W	1940–1950	0.61 mi (0.98 km)	100 yd (91 m)	$0	A brief tornado touched down over an open field	

=== May 30 event ===
List of confirmed tornadoes – Friday, May 30, 2014
EF#	Location	County / Parish	State	Start Coord.	Time (UTC)	Path length	Max width	Damage	Summary	Refs
EF0	W of Clewiston	Hendry	FL	26.73°N 81.16°W	2038–2039	0.25 mi (0.40 km)	10 yd (9.1 m)	$0	An emergency manager reported a brief tornado.	
EF0	Riverview	Hillsborough	FL	27.8175°N 82.2657°W	2045–2047	0.45 mi (0.72 km)	25 yd (23 m)	$50,000	Ten to twelve houses sustained minor damage, primarily to their roofs and windows. A fence and pool enclosure were damaged.	
EF0	NE of Highmore	Hand	SD	44.604°N 99.278°W	2230–2258	5.42 mi (8.72 km)	50 yd (46 m)	$0	Several citizens reported a long-lived tornado over open country.	

=== May 31 event ===
List of confirmed tornadoes – Saturday, May 31, 2014
EF#	Location	County / Parish	State	Start Coord.	Time (UTC)	Path length	Max width	Damage	Summary	Refs
EF0	E of Rockville	Charleston	SC	32.6005°N 80.0889°W	1430–1431	0.11 mi (0.18 km)	30 yd (27 m)	Unknown	Bench chairs and umbrellas were tossed.	
EF0	SE of Jackson	Sublette	WY	43.34°N 110.0059°W	1934–1936	0.32 mi (0.51 km)	30 yd (27 m)	$0	A waterspout was reported over Dollar Lake.	
EF0	N of Forsyth	Rosebud	MT	46.73°N 106.76°W	2055–2100	0.1 mi (0.16 km)	25 yd (23 m)	$0	Law enforcement reported a rope tornado.	
EF0	N of Volborg	Custer	MT	45.86°N 105.68°W	0115–0125	0.1 mi (0.16 km)	25 yd (23 m)	$0	An NWS employee reported a tornado.	

== See also ==
- Tornadoes of 2014
- Tornado outbreak of April 27–30, 2014
- List of United States tornadoes from January to March 2014
- List of United States tornadoes from June to July 2014
