= North Carolina tornado outbreak of April 2014 =

Weather event in the United States

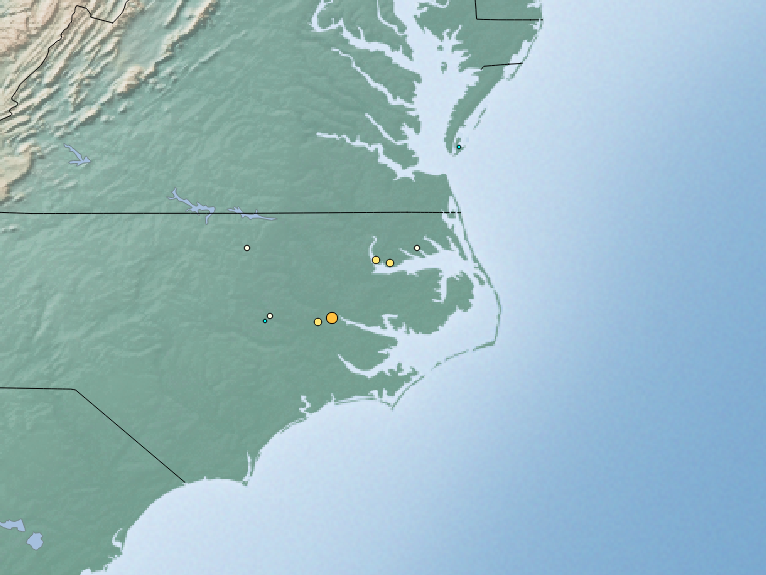
- Map of all the tornadoes that occurred during the outbreak

Meteorological history
- Formed: April 25, 2014

Tornado outbreak
- Tornadoes: 11
- Max. rating: EF3 tornado
- Duration: 4 hours, 31 minutes
- Highest winds: 150 mph (240 km/h) (Washington Park, North Carolina EF3 tornado); 80 mph (130 km/h) (Rocky, Oklahoma on April 23)
- Largest hail: 4.25 in (10.8 cm) in West, Mississippi on April 24

Overall effects
- Fatalities: 1
- Injuries: 19
- Damage: $20.145 million (2014 USD)

On April 25, 2014, a localized tornado outbreak struck North Carolina, resulting in the first tornado-related fatality during that year in the United States. The event marked the latest formation of the first EF3 or stronger tornado during a calendar year and latest date for the first tornadic death.

Throughout North Carolina, the tornadoes killed 1 person and injured 27 others. A total of 327 homes were damaged or destroyed across four counties, with 60% of these being in Beaufort County.

== Meteorological synopsis ==
=== Preceding severe weather event (April 22–24) ===
On April 20, meteorologists at the Storm Prediction Center noted that a significant change in the large-scale synoptic pattern across the United States would allow for a trough to move inland over the Northwestern United States. They noted the possibility of isolated severe thunderstorms across the Rocky Mountain Foothills. This system moved into the region two days later and prompted the issuance of a slight-risk around the Yellowstone National Park region in Idaho, Montana, and Wyoming. Ahead of the trough, upper-level cooling above modest surface heating enhanced low-level lapse rates and allowed for scattered severe storms. Due to a lack of significant moisture, with dew points in the area only at 30 °F (−1 °C), activity was constrained. A severe thunderstorm watch was issued for the region by 2:30 p.m. MDT (2030 UTC) as a cold front associated with the trough moved through. Straight-line winds up to 66 mph (106 km/h) occurred in the area. Further south, a gust of 72 mph (116 km/h) was measured in northwest of Wild Horse, Colorado during a downburst. Across Idaho, approximately 1,600 Rocky Mountain Power customers lost electricity due to the storms. A two vehicle accident near Fredregill was also blamed on the system.

On April 23, the system continued steadily eastward across the Central United States. Daytime heating ahead of the system fueled instability that later fed widespread severe activity that extended from Texas to Nebraska. Convective available potential energy (CAPE) values across the area averaged 1,000 J/kg in Kansas and peaked near 2,000 J/kg in Texas. In contrast to the risk of supercells capable of producing very large hail, only two reports of 2 in (5.1 cm) diameter hail were received that day. In some places, hail from the storms lasted more than 10 minutes and accumulated on the ground. Hurricane-force winds were reported with a few of the cells, namely near Rocky, Oklahoma where gusts reached 80 mph (130 km/h) in a downburst. In Ripley, Oklahoma, straight-line winds tore a metal roof off a home and damaged a few others.

By April 24, the system had transformed into a shortwave trough over the Central Plains with a cold front extending southward to the Gulf of Mexico. Several area of low pressure were excepted to form along this front and propagate northward, congealing into a single system later that day. Ahead of the front, weak, elevated thunderstorms formed; however, a second line closer to the front became better defined during the day due to enhanced moisture. There was initially some question as to the intensity these storms would achieve due to the preceding line limiting daytime heating.

=== Tornado outbreak ===
In advance of a compact shortwave trough and associated cold front, numerous severe thunderstorms developed across central and eastern North Carolina into southern Virginia. An EF3 tornado tracked through the Whichards Beach area, damaging or destroying 100 homes, and injuring 16 people. A separate circulation produced a series of damaging tornadoes near Elizabeth City, including two EF2s, one of which resulted in a fatality. This event marks the latest time of formation of the first EF3+ tornado in any year on record.

Straight-line winds estimated at 75 to 80 mph (121 to 129 km/h) destroyed an outbuilding and part of a barn near Louisburg in Franklin County.

== Confirmed tornadoes ==
Confirmed tornadoes by Enhanced Fujita rating
EFU	EF0	EF1	EF2	EF3	EF4	EF5	Total
0	4	3	3	1	0	0	11

=== April 25 event ===
List of confirmed tornadoes – Friday, April 25, 2014 (Note: All dates are based on the local time zone where the tornado touched down; however, all times are in Coordinated Universal Time for consistency.)
EF#	Location	County / Parish	State	Start Coord.	Time (UTC)	Path length	Max width	Damage (Note: All damage totals are in 2014 USD unless otherwise stated.)	Summary
EF1	S of Essex	Halifax	NC	36.2015°N 77.9465°W	1959–2004	1.86 mi (2.99 km)	75 yd (69 m)	$35,000	The tornado initially snapped about 20 pine trees along North Carolina Highway 43. It then crossed through a heavily wooded area before damaging eight mobile homes, two of which had significant roof damage. One of the mobile homes had a steel rod driven through the side of it. Two carports were destroyed, two houses sustained minor damage, and many other trees (mostly oak and pine) were downed.
EF0	N of Shine	Greene	NC	35.479°N 77.782°W	2038–2039	0.27 mi (0.43 km)	50 yd (46 m)	$95,000	EF0 damage was sustained to trees and six homes. A mobile home sustained extensive damage due to a tree falling on it. An amateur radio antenna was bent in half.
EF1	S of Walstonburg	Greene	NC	35.53°N 77.74°W	2046–2055	4.18 mi (6.73 km)	125 yd (114 m)	$21,000	EF0 to low-end EF1 damage was sustained to several farm outbuildings, one store, several mobiles homes, trees, and two homes. The tornado inflicted strong EF1 damage to the side of a poultry farm building.
EF0	E of Arthur	Pitt	NC	35.6°N 77.46°W	2118	0.01 mi (0.016 km)	20 yd (18 m)	$0	A brief touchdown in a rural area resulted in no damage.
EF2	Blackrock area to E of Rosewood	Bertie Chowan, Perquimans, Pasquotank	NC	36.054°N 76.74°W	2320–0015	35.46 mi (57.07 km)	400 yd (370 m)	$2,025,000	This was the first of two long-tracked tornadoes that affected almost identical areas of eastern North Carolina. This storm touched down in extreme eastern Bertie County before crossing into Chowan County. Near Chapanoke and Mount Hermon along U.S. Route 17, numerous trees were snapped or uprooted and several barns were destroyed. The most severe damage took place in Chapanoke itself where numerous homes were damaged or destroyed; damage here was rated high-end EF2 with winds estimated at 125 mph (201 km/h). Damage elsewhere along most of the tornado's path was minor.
EF2	NE of Chicod	Pitt	NC	35.47°N 77.26°W	2322–2324	1.13 mi (1.82 km)	75 yd (69 m)	$600,000	A brief low-end EF2 tornado damaged or destroyed several mobile homes and outbuildings, as well as farm equipment. A tractor-trailer and a pickup truck were flipped and numerous trees were downed as well.
EF3	W of Chocowinity to N of Bath	Beaufort	NC	35.51°N 77.12°W	2335–0010	20.99 mi (33.78 km)	350 yd (320 m)	$15,000,000	A significant tornado touched down west of Chocowinity and passed just south of Washington, initially producing EF0-strength damage to outbuildings and mobile homes. It strengthened quickly and tore through the Whichards Beach community, producing EF2 to moderate EF3 damage to many site-built homes and mobile homes, as well as numerous businesses. Several of the mobile homes were completely destroyed, and numerous boats and vehicles in the area were destroyed as well. For the last 10 miles (16 km), the tornado weakened back to EF0–EF1 range, producing minor damage across sparsely populated farmland. In all, 150 to 200 homes sustained extensive damage, with many of those being completely destroyed. Hundreds of trees were downed along the path as well. Sixteen people were injured.
EF2	SW of Saint Johns to ENE of Indiantown	Chowan, Perquimans, Pasquotank, Camden	NC	36.05°N 76.55°W	2337–0030	35.48 mi (57.10 km)	400 yd (370 m)	$2,100,000	1 death – Just 17 minutes after the prior event, another tornado touched down in extreme western Chowan. This tornado followed a nearly identical path to the preceding one, though remained south of U.S. Route 17 instead of along/north of it. The tornado moved through Elizabeth City in Pasquotank County at EF1 intensity before crossing into Camden County. It later dissipated shortly before reaching the Camden–Currituck County line. Several homes and mobile homes were heavily damaged or destroyed, and extensive tree and power line damage occurred. An 11-month-old baby sustained severe injuries in Edenton near the beginning of the path and died in the hospital four days later. This became the latest first tornado fatality in 99 years.
EF1	W of Nixonton to Elizabeth City	Pasquotank	NC	36.20°N 76.28°W	2350–0010	6.21 mi (9.99 km)	200 yd (180 m)	$100,000	Numerous trees were downed and mobile homes were damaged.
EF0	N of Elizabeth City	Pasquotank	NC	36.338°N 76.241°W	0012–0014	0.47 mi (0.76 km)	50 yd (46 m)	$0	Numerous trees were snapped and homes had shingles torn off.
EF0	Jarvisburg area	Currituck	NC	36.1985°N 75.8710°W	0028–0030	0.83 mi (1.34 km)	30 yd (27 m)	$15,000	A church outbuilding sustained minor damage and numerous trees were snapped or uprooted. A playground was damaged as well.

== Aftermath ==
In the wake of the tornadoes, North Carolina Governor Pat McCrory declared a state of emergency for Beaufort, Perquimans, Chowan and Pasquotank Counties. He subsequently made a request for federal disaster aid to the Federal Emergency Management Agency (FEMA) on May 2. Two public shelters were opened in Beaufort County. On May 9, FEMA formally denied McCrory's request, stating that the scale of damage was not severe enough to warrant assistance. Though McCrory could have appealed to President Barack Obama, he opted not to and placed priority on providing affected residents with immediate aid. On May 14, local disaster aid in conjunction with the Small Business Administration was approved for residents in Beaufort, Pasquotank, and Perquimans Counties.

== See also ==
- List of tornadoes and tornado outbreaks
- Tornado outbreak of April 27–30, 2014 – A deadly tornado outbreak that occurred just two days later across much of the Central and Eastern United States
