= Taral =

Taral may refer to:

- Fred Taral, American Hall of Fame jockey
- Taral Hicks, actress and musician
- Taral Wayne, Canadian science fiction fan artist
- Taral, Arkansas, an unincorporated community in Pope County, Arkansas
