= Weeksville, North Carolina =

Unincorporated community in North Carolina, US

Coordinates: 36°12′18″N 76°8′54″W

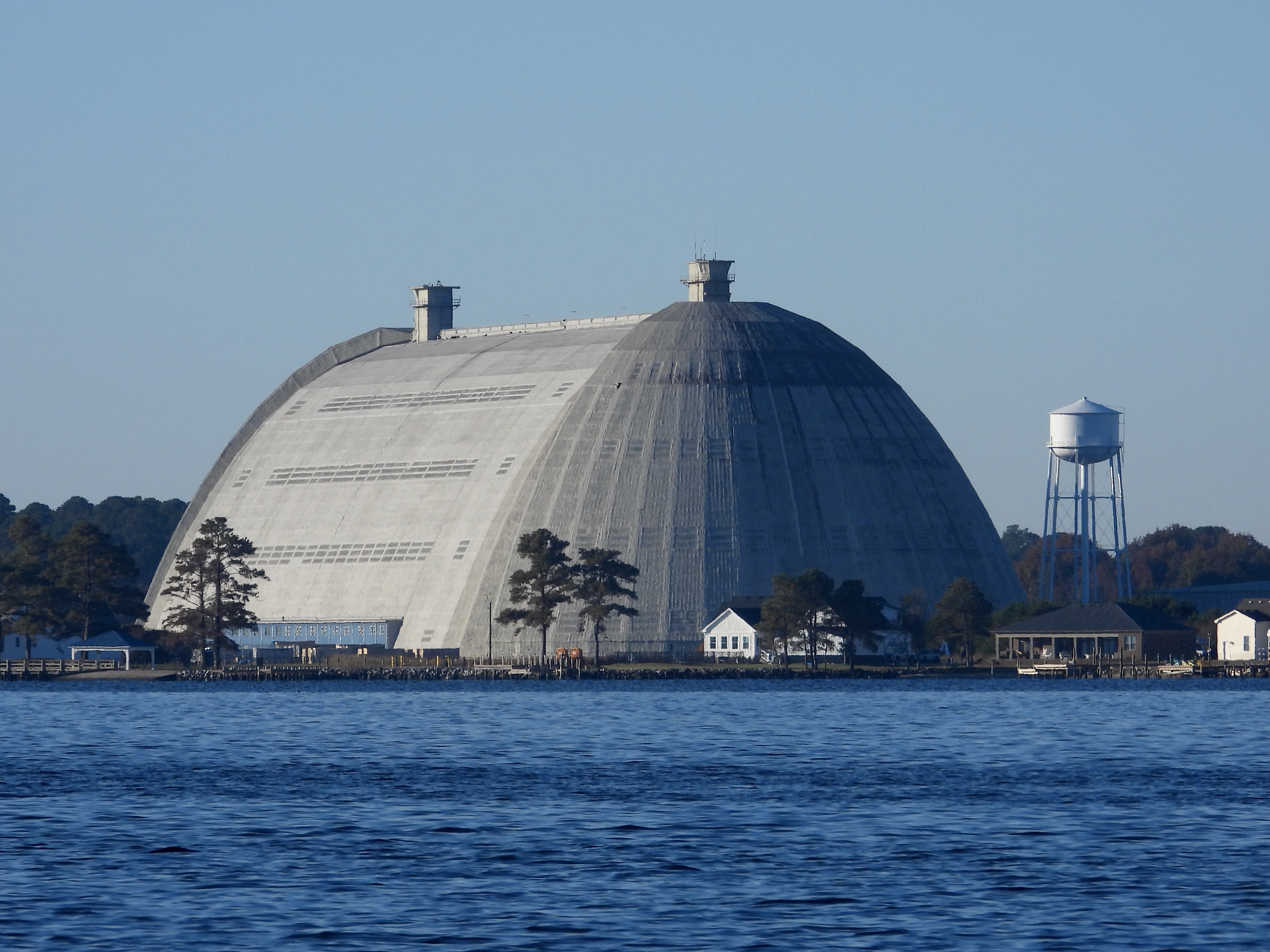
Steel dirigible hangar at NAS Weeksville

Weeksville is an unincorporated community in Pasquotank County, North Carolina, United States. It lies roughly midway on the NC 344 highway, at an elevation of 3 feet (0.91 m). The community is home to Weeksville Elementary School, a Methodist church, gas station, volunteer fire department, Lions Club chapter, and county recycling center.

Of historical significance are the facilities of the aerostat manufacturer TCOM, located on the former grounds of Naval Air Station (NAS) Weeksville. Two dirigible hangars, one steel and one wooden, were constructed at NAS Weeksville in 1942. The larger wooden hangar, one of the largest wooden structures in the world, succumbed to fire on August 3, 1995. The slightly smaller steel hangar, one of the world's largest steel structures, remains as of 2015.

During World War II, flight operations out of NAS Weeksville were instrumental in repelling German U-boat attacks on Allied merchant shipping along the Eastern Seaboard.

It is part of the Elizabeth City Micropolitan Statistical Area.
