= Elvis Presley Lake =

Lake in United States

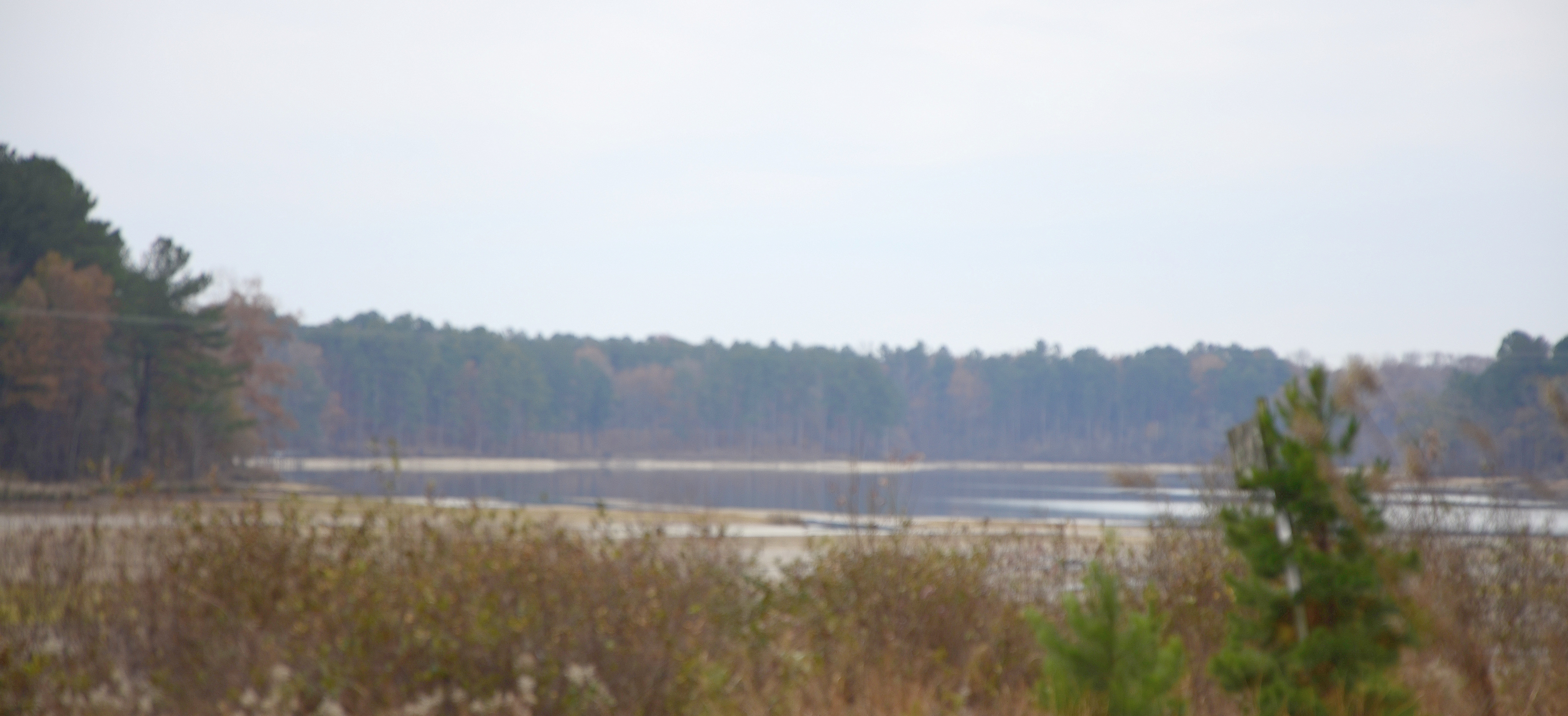

- Location of Elvis Presley Lake Elvis Presley Lake (the United States)
- Location: Lee County, Mississippi, United States
- Coordinates: 34°18′19.08″N 88°39′10.39″W
- Surface area: 322 acres (130 ha)
- Max. depth: 35 ft (11 m)

Elvis Presley Lake is a lake in Lee County, Mississippi, United States.

The lake is named for musician Elvis Presley, who was born in nearby Tupelo.

== Features ==
A campground is located on the east shore of the lake. Private cottages are also located on the lake.

Boating is permitted on Elvis Presley Lake, and a boatramp is located at the campground. Other recreational activities include swimming and fishing, and hiking trails are located nearby.

Blue catfish are abundant in the lake.

A tornado in 2014 destroyed a fishing pier and 95 percent of the trees at the campground.
