= Elizabeth City micropolitan area =

Elizabeth City Micropolitan Area
- Micropolitan Statistical Area
- Elizabeth City, NC Micropolitan Statistical Area
- Jurisdictions in the Hampton Roads MSA are colored in red. Jurisdictions in the CSA, but not the MSA, are colored in pink.
- Country: United States
- State: North Carolina
- Largest city: Elizabeth City
- Time zone: UTC−5 (EST)
  - Summer (DST): UTC−4 (EDT)

The Elizabeth City Micropolitan Statistical Area, as defined by the United States Census Bureau, is an area consisting of one county in the Inner Banks region of eastern North Carolina, anchored by the area of Elizabeth City. It is part of a bigger Virginia Beach-Chesapeake-Norfolk, VA-NC Combined Statistical Area.

As of 2024, the Micropolitan Statistical Area had a population of 41,418, down from the 2010 census count of 64,094, due to the removal of Perquimans and Camden counties from the area. Camden County was moved to the Virginia Beach-Chesapeake-Norfolk MSA, whereas Perquimans County was removed entirely.

== Counties ==
- Pasquotank

== Communities ==
- Elizabeth City (Principal city)
- Nixonton (unincorporated)
- Woodville (unincorporated)

== Demographics ==
As of the census of 2014, there were 64,754 people, 24,229 households, and 17,120 families residing within the μSA. The racial makeup of the USA was 63.9% White, 31.2% African American, 0.3% Native American, 1.0% Asian, 0.0% Pacific Islander, 1.5% from other races, and 2.0% from two or more races. Hispanic or Latino of any race were 3.3% of the population.

The median income for a household in the USA was $33,158, and the median income for a family was $39,000. Males had a median income of $31,199 versus $21,752 for females. The per capita income for the USA was $16,408.

== See also ==
- North Carolina census statistical areas
