= Mount Hermon Township, Pasquotank County, North Carolina =

Township in Pasquotank County, North Carolina, U.S.

Coordinates: 36°16′20″N 76°16′25″W

Mount Hermon is a township in Pasquotank County, North Carolina. Bordering Nixonton, Providence, Elizabeth City, and Perquimans County, this township has an area of 34.7 square miles and a population of 4,206 (as of 2000).

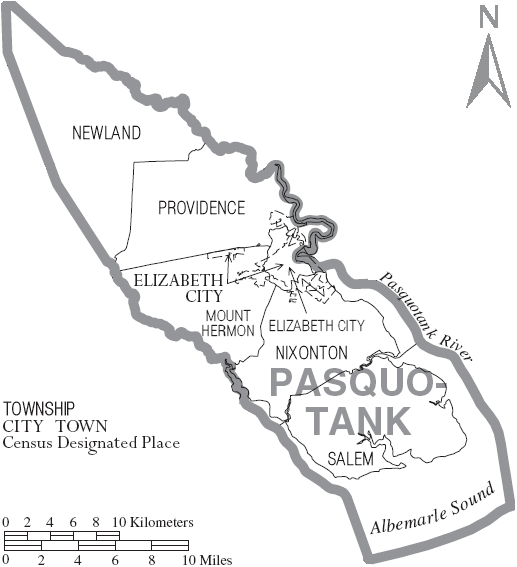
The townships of Pasquotank County
