= Aroney, Alabama =

Unincorporated community in Alabama, United States

- Unincorporated community
- Location within Alabama
- Coordinates: 34°13′18″N 086°04′55″W
- Country: United States
- State: Alabama
- County: DeKalb
- Elevation: 1,099 ft (335 m)
- Time zone: UTC-6 (Central (CST))
  - Summer (DST): UTC-5 (CDT)
- ZIP code: 35957
- Area code: 256
- GNIS ID: 150074

Aroney is an unincorporated community located on Sand Mountain in far southwestern DeKalb County, Alabama, United States, approximately five miles east of the city of Boaz.

== History ==
The Aroney post office was established in 1890. It has been since been discontinued. The community's name was incorrectly spelled "Arona" on the 1966 USGS Base Maps. Ever since, the misspelling has been duplicated on many other maps and geographical databases. The spelling continues to be used by the USGS, which lists "Aroney" as a variant spelling. Conversely, "Aroney" is the name of the post office in the USGS database.

== People ==
The people of Aroney, Alabama are historically farmers. They grew cotton during the 1950s and 1960s, but like many others when the cost of growing cotton outweighed the value of the cotton once it was picked, Aroney farmers shifted to growing soybeans and corn. Many of the farmers, at the urging of the state agricultural department, fenced in their fields and started raising cattle. The town never got big enough to require even a single stop light. For some period of time, there was a flashing light that was then downgraded to a 4-way stop intersection and finally to a through fare.

Until the last 20 years, the people of Aroney were related in some way. The area never grew large enough to justify a school system, but until the early 1970's, there was a small school called Center Point Junior High School. When built, the school housed classrooms for grades 1–9, but as time went on it was downgraded to grades 1-6 and eventually closed in 1976. All that is left of the school is the front doorsteps and the lunchroom.

== Geography ==
Aroney is located at 34°13′18″N 086°04′55″W. Its average elevation is 1,099 feet (335 m) above sea level.
