= Ridgley, Missouri =

Unincorporated community in Missouri, US

Coordinates: 36°41′50″N 94°01′13″W

Ridgley is an unincorporated community in Barry County, in the U.S. state of Missouri.

== History ==
A post office called Ridgley was established in 1909, and remained in operation until 1919. The community's lofty elevation atop a ridge accounts for the name.
