= Vaughn, Georgia =

Unincorporated community in Spalding County, GA

- Unincorporated community
- Interactive map of Vaughn, Georgia
- Coordinates: 33°16′51.4″N 84°23′31.0″W
- Named for: James William Vaughn

Population (2020)
  - Total: 3,067

Vaughn, Georgia, is a census county division and unincorporated community in Spalding County, Georgia. The population was 3,067 according to the 2020 United States census.

== History ==
James William Vaughn and his family established a plantation in the area in the late 19th century. He donated some of his land, and as such, the community took his name. In 1894, the Vaughn Post Office was established. In the early 20th century, a Norfolk Southern Cedartown District railroad was built, and it went through Vaughn. At one point, it had brought First Lady Eleanor Roosevelt through town. The railroad is now closed, and sits abandoned. The Vaughn Post Office closed in 1953, and the area is now served by the Griffin Post Office, using ZIP Code 30223.

Today, Vaughn sits in unincorporated Spalding County on West McIntosh Road, near the border with Fayette County, Georgia.

== Demographics ==
According to 2020 census data, Vaughn has 3,067 people, which 13.5% of residents have a bachelor's degree or higher. The median household income is $75,306, higher than the Spalding County median household income of $53,803. However, 9.6% of residents in Vaughn are impoverished.
