= Pasquotank County, North Carolina =

County in North Carolina, United States

- County
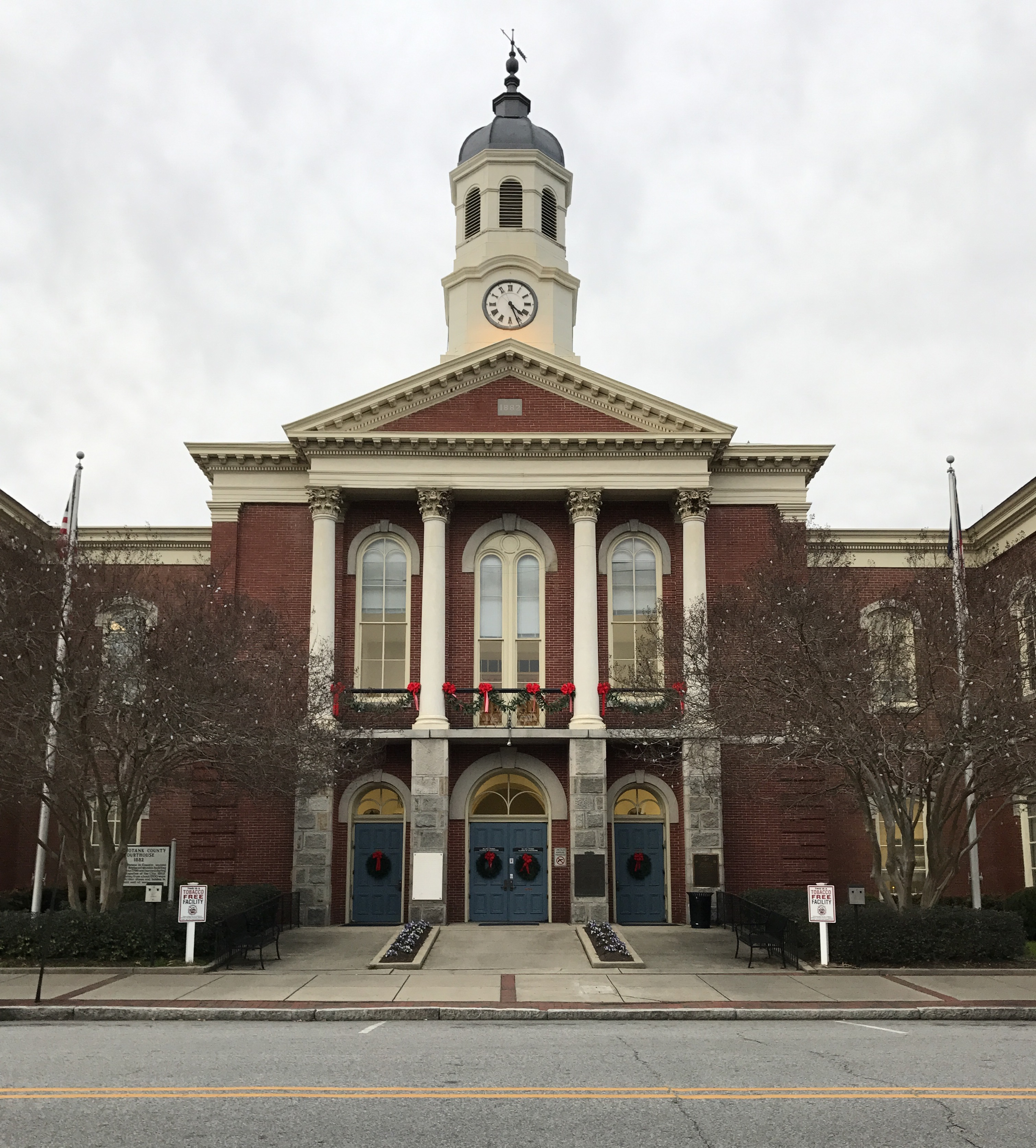
- Pasquotank County Courthouse

- Seal Logo

- Location within the U.S. state of North Carolina
- Coordinates: 36.27°N 76.26°W
- Country: United States
- State: North Carolina
- Founded: 1668
- Named for: Indian word meaning "where the current of the stream divides or forks"
- Seat: Elizabeth City
- Largest community: Elizabeth City

Area
  - Total: 289.33 sq mi (749.4 km^{2})
  - Land: 226.88 sq mi (587.6 km^{2})
  - Water: 62.45 sq mi (161.7 km^{2}) 21.58%

Population (2020)
  - Total: 40,568
  - Estimate (2025): 42,201 ▲
  - Density: 178.81/sq mi (69.04/km^{2})
- Time zone: UTC−5 (Eastern)
  - Summer (DST): UTC−4 (EDT)
- Congressional district: 1st
- Website: www.co.pasquotank.nc.us

Pasquotank County (PAS-kwoh-tayngk /ˈpæs.kwoʊ.teɪŋk/) is a county located in the U.S. state of North Carolina. As of the 2020 census, the population was 40,568. Its county seat is Elizabeth City. Pasquotank County is part of the Elizabeth City, NC Micropolitan Statistical Area, which is also included in the Virginia Beach-Chesapeake, VA-NC Combined Statistical Area.

== History ==
The county was originally created as Pasquotank Precinct and gained county status in 1739. The largest community and county seat is Elizabeth City.

== Geography ==
Interactive map of Pasquotank County

According to the U.S. Census Bureau, the county has a total area of 289.33 square miles (749.4 km^{2}), of which 226.88 square miles (587.6 km^{2}) is land and 62.45 square miles (161.7 km^{2}) (21.58%) is water. It is the fifth-smallest county in North Carolina by land area.

Almost all of the terrain in Pasquotank County is flatland with a topography near sea level, a characteristic of most of North Carolina's Coastal Plain. The county is flanked by two rivers: the Pasquotank and the Little River.

=== National protected area ===
- Great Dismal Swamp National Wildlife Refuge (part)

=== State and Local protected site ===
- Museum of the Albemarle

=== Major water bodies ===
- Albemarle Sound
- Big Flatty Creek
- Intracoastal Waterway
- Little River
- Newbegun Creek
- Pasquotank River

=== Adjacent counties ===
- Gates County – northwest
- Camden County – east
- Tyrrell County – south
- Perquimans County – southwest

=== Major highways ===
- Future I-87
- US 17
- US 17 Bus.
- US 17 Bus. Truck
- US 17 Byp.
- US 158
- NC 344

=== Major infrastructure ===
- Elizabeth City Regional Airport

== Demographics ==
Historical population
Census	Pop.	Note	%±
1790	5,477		—
1800	5,379		−1.8%
1810	7,674		42.7%
1820	8,008		4.4%
1830	8,641		7.9%
1840	8,514		−1.5%
1850	8,950		5.1%
1860	8,940		−0.1%
1870	8,131		−9.0%
1880	10,369		27.5%
1890	10,748		3.7%
1900	13,660		27.1%
1910	16,693		22.2%
1920	17,670		5.9%
1930	19,143		8.3%
1940	20,568		7.4%
1950	24,347		18.4%
1960	25,630		5.3%
1970	26,824		4.7%
1980	28,462		6.1%
1990	31,298		10.0%
2000	34,897		11.5%
2010	40,661		16.5%
2020	40,568		−0.2%
2025 (est.)	42,201	▲	4.0%
U.S. Decennial Census; 1790–1960 1900–1990; 1990–2000 2010 2020

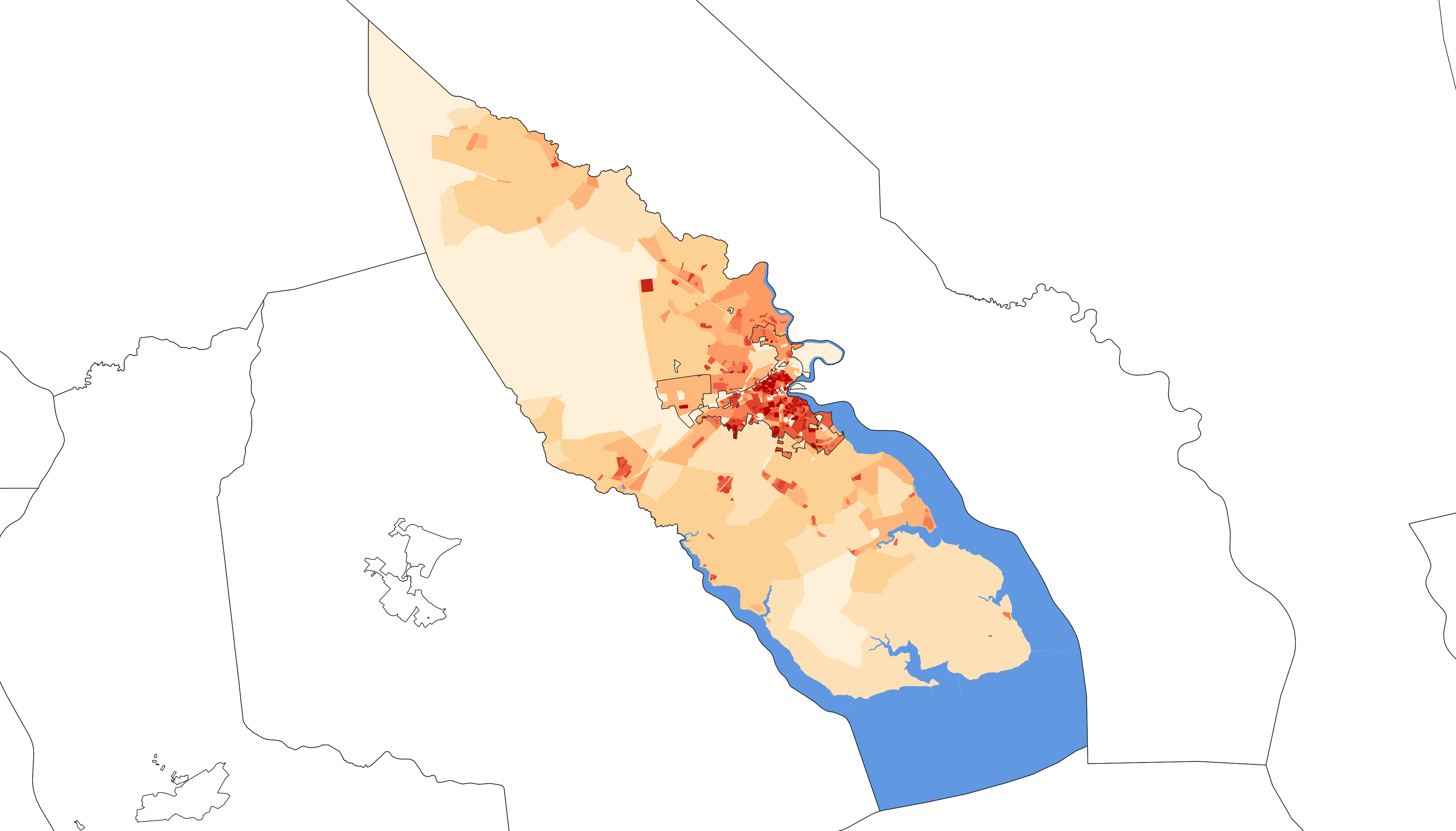
2020 population density of Pasquotank County NC by census block

=== 2020 census ===
Pasquotank County, North Carolina – Racial and ethnic composition Note: the US Census treats Hispanic/Latino as an ethnic category. This table excludes Latinos from the racial categories and assigns them to a separate category. Hispanics/Latinos may be of any race.
Race / Ethnicity (NH = Non-Hispanic)	Pop 1980	Pop 1990	Pop 2000	Pop 2010	Pop 2020	% 1980	% 1990	% 2000	% 2010	% 2020
White alone (NH)	17,767	19,259	19,665	22,369	21,577	62.42%	61.53%	56.35%	55.01%	53.19%
Black or African American alone (NH)	10,322	11,557	13,932	15,256	14,316	36.27%	36.93%	39.92%	37.52%	35.29%
Native American or Alaska Native alone (NH)	23	55	120	124	150	0.08%	0.18%	0.34%	0.30%	0.37%
Asian alone (NH)	148	176	298	449	458	0.52%	0.56%	0.85%	1.10%	1.13%
Native Hawaiian or Pacific Islander alone (NH)	x	x	13	15	28	x	x	0.04%	0.04%	0.07%
Other race alone (NH)	13	5	36	63	178	0.05%	0.02%	0.10%	0.15%	0.44%
Mixed race or Multiracial (NH)	x	x	404	743	1,624	x	x	1.16%	1.83%	4.00%
Hispanic or Latino (any race)	189	246	429	1,642	2,237	0.66%	0.79%	1.23%	4.04%	5.51%
Total	28,462	31,298	34,897	40,661	40,568	100.00%	100.00%	100.00%	100.00%	100.00%

As of the 2020 census, there were 40,568 people, 15,616 households, and 9,829 families residing in the county. The median age was 39.8 years, with 21.2% of residents under the age of 18 and 18.5% of residents 65 years of age or older. For every 100 females there were 95.3 males, and for every 100 females age 18 and over there were 93.2 males age 18 and over.

The racial makeup of the county was 54.3% White, 35.7% Black or African American, 0.5% American Indian and Alaska Native, 1.2% Asian, 0.1% Native Hawaiian and Pacific Islander, 2.5% from some other race, and 5.7% from two or more races. Hispanic or Latino residents of any race comprised 5.5% of the population.

54.9% of residents lived in urban areas, while 45.1% lived in rural areas.

There were 15,616 households in the county, of which 30.4% had children under the age of 18 living in them. Of all households, 44.2% were married-couple households, 17.4% were households with a male householder and no spouse or partner present, and 32.1% were households with a female householder and no spouse or partner present. About 28.0% of all households were made up of individuals and 12.3% had someone living alone who was 65 years of age or older.

There were 17,410 housing units, of which 10.3% were vacant. Among occupied housing units, 62.9% were owner-occupied and 37.1% were renter-occupied. The homeowner vacancy rate was 2.3% and the rental vacancy rate was 6.7%.

=== 2010 census ===
At the 2010 census, there were 40,661 people, 13,907 households, and 9,687 families residing in the county. The population density was 154 people per square mile (59 people/km^{2}). There were 14,289 housing units at an average density of 63 units per square mile (24 units/km^{2}). The racial makeup of the county was 56.7% White, 37.8% Black or African American, 0.3% Native American, 1.1% Asian, 0.0% Pacific Islander, 1.8% from other races, and 2.2% from two or more races. 4.0% of the population were Hispanic or Latino of any race.

There were 12,907 households, out of which 33.4% had children under the age of 18 living with them, 50.4% were married couples living together, 16.3% had a female householder with no husband present, and 29.5% were non-families. 25.4% of all households were made up of individuals, and 11.4% had someone living alone who was 65 years of age or older. The average household size was 2.52 and the average family size was 3.01.

In the county, the population was spread out, with 24.9% under the age of 18, 11.3% from 18 to 24, 28.4% from 25 to 44, 21.3% from 45 to 64, and 14.1% who were 65 years of age or older. The median age was 36 years. For every 100 females there were 93.8 males. For every 100 females age 18 and over, there were 90.1 males.

The median income for a household in the county was $30,444, and the median income for a family was $36,402. Males had a median income of $30,072 versus $21,652 for females. The per capita income for the county was $14,815. 18.4% of the population and 15.5% of families were below the poverty line. Out of the total people living in poverty, 25.5% are under the age of 18 and 17.9% are 65 or older.

== Government and politics ==
Pasquotank County is a member of the Albemarle Commission regional council of governments.

United States presidential election results for Pasquotank County, North Carolina
Year	Republican		Democratic		Third party(ies)	
Year	No.	%	No.	%	No.	%
1912	77	6.24%	972	78.83%	184	14.92%
1916	270	18.65%	1,177	81.28%	1	0.07%
1920	507	22.60%	1,736	77.40%	0	0.00%
1924	305	19.64%	1,236	79.59%	12	0.77%
1928	814	29.52%	1,943	70.48%	0	0.00%
1932	328	9.96%	2,946	89.49%	18	0.55%
1936	324	9.13%	3,226	90.87%	0	0.00%
1940	506	13.25%	3,314	86.75%	0	0.00%
1944	860	25.29%	2,540	74.71%	0	0.00%
1948	701	24.04%	1,976	67.76%	239	8.20%
1952	2,101	36.99%	3,579	63.01%	0	0.00%
1956	1,827	38.14%	2,963	61.86%	0	0.00%
1960	1,827	28.74%	4,530	71.26%	0	0.00%
1964	2,380	35.79%	4,269	64.21%	0	0.00%
1968	1,430	18.84%	2,564	33.78%	3,597	47.39%
1972	3,906	63.07%	2,115	34.15%	172	2.78%
1976	2,651	37.89%	4,302	61.49%	43	0.61%
1980	3,340	43.39%	4,128	53.62%	230	2.99%
1984	4,646	54.58%	3,854	45.27%	13	0.15%
1988	4,006	50.76%	3,860	48.91%	26	0.33%
1992	3,419	35.69%	4,709	49.15%	1,453	15.17%
1996	2,999	38.34%	4,233	54.12%	590	7.54%
2000	4,943	45.34%	5,874	53.88%	86	0.79%
2004	6,609	48.42%	6,984	51.17%	55	0.40%
2008	7,778	42.78%	10,272	56.50%	130	0.72%
2012	7,633	42.15%	10,282	56.78%	192	1.06%
2016	8,180	47.04%	8,615	49.54%	596	3.43%
2020	9,770	49.10%	9,832	49.41%	295	1.48%
2024	10,537	51.80%	9,549	46.94%	257	1.26%

== Education ==
Schools in Pasquotank county include College of The Albemarle, Elizabeth City State University, Mid-Atlantic Christian University, and Pasquotank County High School.

== Communities ==
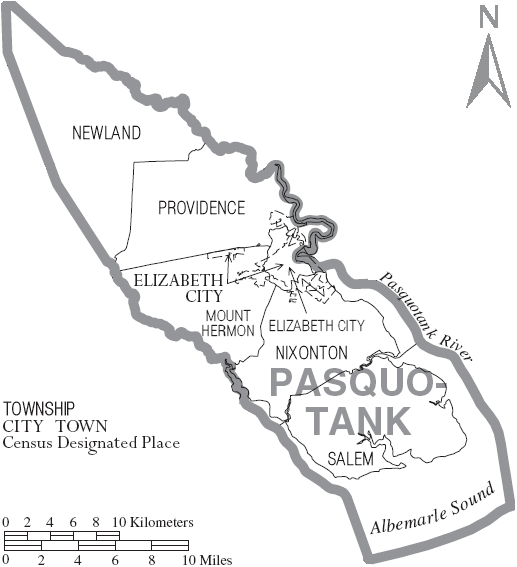
Map of Pasquotank County with municipal and township labels

=== City ===
- Elizabeth City (county seat and largest community; partly in Camden County)

=== Unincorporated communities ===
- Nixonton
- Weeksville

=== Townships ===
- Elizabeth City
- Mount Hermon
- Newland
- Nixonton
- Providence
- Salem

== See also ==
- List of counties in North Carolina
- National Register of Historic Places listings in Pasquotank County, North Carolina
