= Taral, Arkansas =

- Unincorporated community
- Position in Arkansas
- Coordinates: 35°21′37″N 93°07′18″W
- Country: United States
- State: Arkansas
- County: Pope
- Elevation: 410 ft (120 m)
- Time zone: UTC-6 (Central (CST))
  - Summer (DST): UTC-5 (CDT)
- GNIS feature ID: 62100

Taral is an unincorporated community in Pope County, Arkansas, United States.
