= Nixonton, North Carolina =

Nixonton
- Unincorporated community
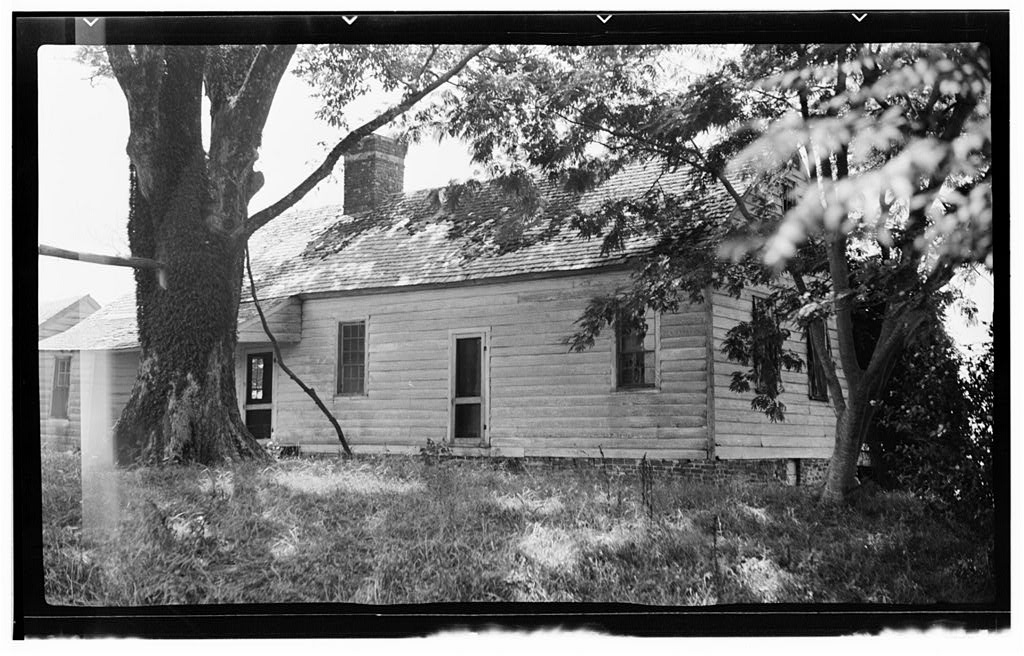
- Lane House on State Route 1137 in the town

- Location within the state of North Carolina
- Coordinates: 36°12′3″N 76°16′22″W
- Country: United States
- State: North Carolina
- County: Pasquotank
- Elevation: 0 ft (0 m)
- Time zone: UTC-5 (Eastern (EST))
  - Summer (DST): UTC-4 (EDT)
- GNIS feature ID: 1025582

Nixonton (also Nixons Town or Windmill Point) is an unincorporated community in Pasquotank County, North Carolina, United States. Nixonton was once a municipality, having been incorporated in 1758.

A small port, a hub for Quaker trade in the area, existed at the townsite from the 1740s. In 1746, Zachariah Nixon (III, d. 1752), bequeathed 161.5 acres of the land north of the Little River of Albemarle Sound in Pasquotank County to be incorporated as a town. The Nixons were an important settler family, and upon his death in 1752, Nixon gave his sons Francis (d. 1772) and Zachariah IV (d. 1775) large sums of land, including in what was then known as "Nixon town". By the time it was incorporated on December 5, 1758, over 50 acres of the town had been divided into a grid of half-acre lots with 70 permanent residents; it was named "Nixon's town" and Francis Nixon, among others, was appointed trustee to develop the town. In 1770, Nixonton was the only town in Pasquotank and in 1784 the Pasquotank court house was established Nixonton, which was also the county seat between 1785 (also when the town's prison was commissioned) and 1800, when it was replaced in both capacities by the newly-built Elizabeth (City). Nixonton Academy school existed between 1804 and the 1830s.

It is part of the Elizabeth City micropolitan area.
