= 1988 McDonald's All-American Boys Game =

American high school basketball game

East	West
105	99
	1st half	2nd half	Total
East	53	52	105
West	43	56	99
- Date: April 17, 1988
- Venue: The Pit, Albuquerque, NM
- MVP: Alonzo Mourning and Billy Owens
- Attendance: 12,815
- Network: ABC
- Announcers: Keith Jackson and Dick Vitale

McDonald's All-American

The 1988 McDonald's All-American Boys Game was an All-star basketball game played on Sunday, April 17, 1988 at The Pit in Albuquerque, New Mexico. The game's rosters featured the best and most highly recruited high school boys graduating in 1988. The game was the 11th annual version of the McDonald's All-American Game first played in 1978.

== 1988 game ==
The game was telecast live by ABC. The East team had many forwards and centers in its roster, among them Alonzo Mourning and Billy Owens, two of the top-ranked big men of their class. Kenny Williams, another highly regarded prospect, was selected but did not play. Chris Jackson, the highest ranked point guard in the nation, was also part of the East team. The West had Shawn Kemp and LaPhonso Ellis, two other forwards/centers who were in the top positions of the high school rankings, along with Darrick Martin and Lee Mayberry, two of the best guards. Mourning was the top scorer of the East with 16 points, while Owens had 10 points and 14 rebounds; Jackson scored 13 points and Malik Sealy had 12. Kemp scored 18 (the highest number of points in the game), while Todd Day had 15 points. Mourning and Owens were selected as co-MVPs. Of the 25 players, 21 went on to play at least 1 game in the NBA.

=== East roster ===
No.	Name	Height	Weight	Position	Hometown	High school	College of Choice
11	Litterial Green	6-1	185	G	Moss Point, MS	Moss Point	Undecided
21	Milton Bell	6-6	210	F	Richmond, VA	John Marshall	Georgetown
22	Malik Sealy	6-7	180	F	Bronx, NY	St. Nicholas of Tolentine	St. John's
25	Chris Jackson	6-0	170	G	Gulfport, MS	Gulfport	LSU
32	Jerrod Mustaf	6-10	200	C	Hyattsville, MD	DeMatha	Maryland
33	Alonzo Mourning	6-10	230	C	Chesapeake, VA	Indian River	Georgetown
34	Billy Owens	6-8	215	F	Carlisle, PA	Carlisle	Syracuse
35	Donald Hodge	6-10	230	C	Washington, DC	Calvin Coolidge	Temple
36	Crawford Palmer	6-8	225	C	Arlington, VA	Washington-Lee	Duke
42	Christian Laettner	6-10	225	C	Buffalo, NY	Nichols	Duke
43	Anthony Peeler	6-5	200	G	Kansas City, MO	Paseo	Missouri
50	Robert Werdann	6-10	250	C	Jamaica, NY	Archbishop Molloy	St. John's
N/A	Kenny Williams	6-9	220	F	Elizabeth City, NC	Northeastern	North Carolina

=== West roster ===
No.	Name	Height	Weight	Position	Hometown	High school	College of Choice
10	Todd Day	6-7	180	G/F	Memphis, TN	Hamilton	Arkansas
11	Lee Mayberry	6-2	170	G	Tulsa, OK	Will Rogers	Arkansas
15	Darrick Martin	5-11	170	G	Long Beach, CA	St. Anthony	UCLA
24	Don MacLean	6-9	220	F	Simi Valley, CA	Simi Valley	UCLA
32	Raymond Thompson	6-5	195	G	Summit, IL	Argo	Iowa
33	Stacey Poole	6-5	200	F	Jacksonville, FL	Nathan B. Forrest	Florida
34	Matt Steigenga	6-7	220	F	Grand Rapids, MI	South Christian	Michigan State
40	Shawn Kemp	6-10	230	F	Elkhart, IN	Concord	Kentucky
42	Chris Mills	6-6 1/2	210	F	Los Angeles, CA	Fairfax	Kentucky
50	LaPhonso Ellis	6-9	220	C	East St. Louis, IL	Lincoln	Notre Dame
53	Stanley Roberts	6-11	265	C	Hopkins, SC	Lower Richland	LSU
55	Eric Anderson	6-8	210	F	Chicago, IL	St. Francis de Sales	Indiana

=== Coaches ===
The East team was coached by:

- Head coach Bob Hurley of St. Anthony (Jersey City, New Jersey)

The West team was coached by:

- Head coach Jim Hulsman of Albuquerque High School (Albuquerque, New Mexico)

== All-American Week ==
=== Contest winners ===
- The 1988 Slam Dunk contest was won by Matt Steigenga.
