= North Carolina Mr. Basketball =

Honor awarded to high school basketball players

The North Carolina Mr. Basketball honor recognizes the top boys’ high school senior basketball player in the state of North Carolina. The award is presented annually by the Charlotte Observer.

== Award winners ==
| Year | Player | High School | College | NBA draft |
|---|---|---|---|---|
| 1985 | Chucky Brown | North Brunswick | NC State | 1989 NBA draft : 2nd Rnd, 43rd overall by the Cleveland Cavaliers |
| 1986 | Robert Brickey | E. E. Smith | Duke | |
| 1987 | Henrik Rodl | Chapel Hill | North Carolina | |
| 1988 | Kenny Williams | Northeastern | Barton County CC | 1990 NBA draft : 2nd Rnd, 46th overall by the Indiana Pacers |
| 1989 | Bryant Feggins | Glenn | NC State | |
| 1990 | Rodney Rogers | Durham Hillside | Wake Forest | 1993 NBA draft : 1st Rnd, 9th overall by the Denver Nuggets |
| 1991 | Donald Williams | Garner | North Carolina | |
| 1992 | Todd Fuller | Charlotte Christian School | NC State | 1996 NBA draft : 1st Rnd, 11th overall by the Golden State Warriors |
| 1993 | Jeff Capel | South View | Duke | |
| 1994 | Ishua Benjamin | Concord | NC State | |
| 1995 | Antawn Jamison | Providence | North Carolina | 1998 NBA draft : 1st Rnd, 4th overall by the Toronto Raptors |
| 1996 | Vincent Whitt | Dudley | Clemson | |
| 1997 | Jenis Grindstaff | McDowell | Virginia Tech; Tennessee | |
| 1998 | Kris Lang | Hunter Huss | North Carolina | |
| 1999 | Jason Parker | West Charlotte | Kentucky | |
| 2000 | Scooter Sherrill | West Rowan | NC State | |
| 2001 | Anthony Richardson | Leesville Road | Florida State | |
| 2002 | Shavlik Randolph | Broughton | Duke | 2005 NBA draft : Undrafted, free agent signed by Philadelphia 76ers |
| 2003 | Chris Paul | West Forsyth | Wake Forest | 2005 NBA draft : 1st Rnd, 4th overall by the New Orleans Hornets |
| 2004 | Anthony Morrow | Charlotte Latin School | Georgia Tech | 2008 NBA draft : Undrafted, free agent signed by Golden State |
| 2005 | Kevin Swinton | Dudley | UNC Wilmington | |
| 2006 | Will Graves | Dudley | North Carolina | |
| 2007 | Demontez Stitt | Butler | Clemson | |
| 2008 | Ty Walker | New Hanover | Wake Forest | |
| 2009 | Mason Plumlee | Christ School | Duke | 2013 NBA draft: 1st Rnd, 22nd overall by the Brooklyn Nets |
| 2010 | Reggie Bullock | Kinston | North Carolina | 2013 NBA draft: 1st Rnd, 25th overall by the Los Angeles Clippers |
| 2011 | Terry Whisnant | Cherryville | Florida State; East Carolina | |
| 2012 | Rodney Purvis | Upper Room Christian Academy | NC State; Connecticut | |
| 2013 | Isaiah Hicks | Webb | North Carolina | |
| 2014 | Theo Pinson | High Point Wesleyan | North Carolina | 2018 NBA draft : Undrafted, free agent signed by Brooklyn Nets |
| 2015 | Brandon Ingram | Kinston | Duke | 2016 NBA draft : 1st Rnd, 2nd overall by the Los Angeles Lakers |
| 2016 | Bam Adebayo | High Point Christian Academy | Kentucky | 2017 NBA draft : 1st Rnd, 14th overall by the Miami Heat |
| 2017 | Lavar Batts | Jay M. Robinson | NC State; UNC Asheville | |
| 2018 | Coby White | Greenfield School | North Carolina | 2019 NBA draft : 1st Rnd, 7th overall by the Chicago Bulls |
| 2019 | Wendell Moore Jr. | Cox Mill | Duke | 2022 NBA draft: 1st Rnd, 26th overall by the Dallas Mavericks |
| 2020 | Tristan Maxwell | North Mecklenburg | Georgia Tech | |
| 2021 | Terquavion Smith | Farmville Central | NC State | 2023 NBA draft : Undrafted, free agent signed by Brooklyn Nets |
| 2022 | Cade Tyson | Carmel Christian | Minnesota, Belmont; North Carolina | |
| 2023 | Isaiah Evans | North Mecklenburg | Duke | 2026 NBA draft: 2nd Rnd, 33rd overall by the Brooklyn Nets |
| 2024 | Isaiah Evans | North Mecklenburg | Duke | 2026 NBA draft: 2nd Rnd, 33rd overall by the Brooklyn Nets |
| 2025 | Zymicah Wilkins | Christ School | NC State | |
| 2026 | Dionte Neal | Reidsville | UNC Greensboro | |

=== Schools with multiple winners ===
| School | Number of Awards | Years |
|---|---|---|
| Dudley | 3 | 1996, 2005, 2006 |
| North Mecklenburg | 3 | 2020, 2023, 2024 |
| Kinston | 2 | 2010, 2015 |
| Christ School | 2 | 2009, 2025 |

== See also ==
- North Carolina Miss Basketball
