= E. E. Smith (disambiguation) =

There are multiple people with the name "E. E. Smith".

== People ==
- E. E. "Doc" Smith, science fiction author and food engineer
- Ezekiel Ezra Smith, Principal and Chief Administrative Officer of the State Colored Normal School, now Fayetteville State University
- Evelyn E. Smith, science fiction and mystery author, also known by the pseudonym Delphine C. Lyons

== Places ==
- E. E. Smith High School, named for Ezekiel Ezra Smith, in Fayetteville, North Carolina
