= Kenny Williams (basketball, born 1969) =

American basketball player (born 1969)

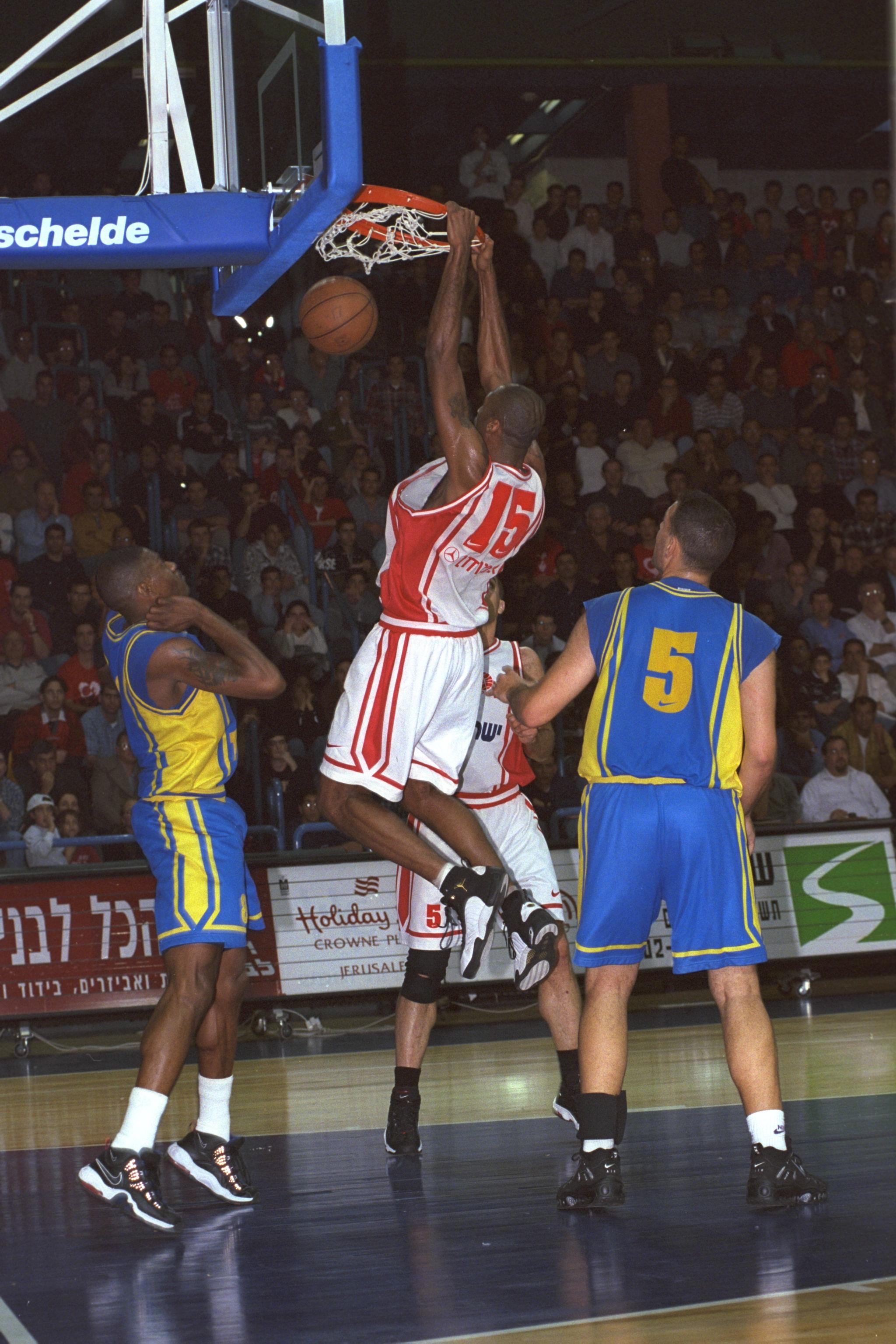
- Williams dunking the ball while playing for Hapoel Jerusalem

Personal information
- Born: June 9, 1969 (age 57) Elizabeth City, North Carolina, U.S.
- Listed height: 6 ft 9 in (2.06 m)
- Listed weight: 235 lb (107 kg)

Career information
- High school: Northeastern (Elizabeth City, North Carolina); Fork Union Military Academy (Fork Union, Virginia)
- College: Barton CC (1988–1989)
- NBA draft: 1990: 2nd round, 46th overall pick
- Drafted by: Indiana Pacers
- Playing career: 1990–2006
- Position: Small forward / power forward
- Number: 44

Career history
- 1990–1994: Indiana Pacers
- 1994–1995: Olitalia Forlì
- 1995: ASVEL Villeurbanne
- 1995–1997: Carne Montana Forlì
- 1997–2001: Hapoel Jerusalem
- 2001–2002: Bnei HaSharon
- 2003–2004: Ironi Ramat Gan
- 2004–2005: Hapoel Tel Aviv
- 2005–2006: Maccabi Habik'a

Career highlights
- First-team Parade All-American (1988); North Carolina Mr. Basketball (1988); McDonald's All-American (1988)

Career NBA statistics
- Points: 1,247 (4.8 ppg)
- Rebounds: 693 (2.7 rpg)
- Stats at NBA.com
- Stats at Basketball Reference

Kenneth Ray Williams (born June 9, 1969) is an American former professional basketball player, most notably with the National Basketball Association's Indiana Pacers. He was known for his stellar leaping ability and off-court problems.

== Biography ==
Williams, a 6' 9" forward, was a prep sensation at Elizabeth City (N.C.) Northeastern High School. His sophomore year, he averaged over 20 points and 12 rebounds a game. He played in the Hampton Roads Basketball Classic in Norfolk, scoring 42 points, and winning the MVP award over the likes of Alonzo Mourning, JR Reid, and Dennis Scott. He was named first team AP All-State. Prior to his junior year, he transferred to Fork Union Military Academy in Virginia, where he averaged 17 points and 12 rebounds for a 29–0 team. In his senior year, he averaged 31 points per game and 12 rebounds a game, and was named state player of the year for North Carolina in 1988. Williams was named first-team USA Today (over such players as Shawn Kemp and Stanley Roberts) and first-team Parade All-American. Williams was selected to play in the McDonald's All-American Game and the Capital Classic, though he only played in the Classic, scoring eight points. In addition, he played two scrimmages against Mourning, and more than held his own, scoring 41 points in the first scrimmage and outrebounding Alonzo in both scrimmages.

Williams was one of the top four players in the class of 1988, along with Alonzo Mourning, Billy Owens and Kemp. He was heavily recruited by the University of North Carolina, but was not offered a scholarship because of his failure to meet the minimum academic standards. His commitment with UNC scared off some top recruits, among them Billy Owens. He instead enrolled at Barton County Community College in Barton County, Kansas (20.5 points and 8.9 rebounds per game).

In 1989–90, Williams attended Elizabeth City State University, where he did not play basketball. He was subsequently selected in the second round of the 1990 NBA draft by the Indiana Pacers (46th overall pick).

Williams played four seasons for the Pacers, from 1990–1994 and had a career high 6.3 points per game while playing in 68 games in 1993–94. He scored a career high 25 points in a Pacers win against the Miami Heat on February 9, 1994. For his career he averaged 4.8 points and 2.7 rebounds in 260 total games. He was also a contestant in the 1991 NBA Slam Dunk Contest but failed to advance into the second round.

Following his NBA career, Williams went to Europe and played in several countries, mainly in Israel: ASVEL Villeurbanne (1995–96), Forli (1996–97), Hapoel Jerusalem (1997–2000, 2001, being runner-up twice in the national cup and once in the league), Troy Pilsener Izmir (2000, returning to Hapoel shortly after), Bnei Herzeliya (2001–02), Maccabi Ironi Ramat Gan (2003–04), Hapoel Tel Aviv (2004–05, again losing in the league final) and Maccabi Giv'at Shmuel (2005–06).
