= Elizabeth City-Pasquotank Public Schools =

PK–12 graded school district in North Carolina, USA

Location
- Pasquotank County, North Carolina United States

District information
- Type: Public
- Grades: PK–12
- Established: 1969
- Superintendent: Rhonda James-Davis (Interim)
- Schools: 13
- Budget: $ 59,998,000
- NCES District ID: 3703540

Students and staff
- Students: 6,212
- Teachers: 445.64 (on FTE basis)
- Staff: 432.05 (on FTE basis)
- Student–teacher ratio: 13.94:1

Other information
- Website: www.ecpps.k12.nc.us

Elizabeth City-Pasquotank Public Schools (ECPPS) is a PK–12 graded school district serving Pasquotank County, North Carolina, including Elizabeth City. Its 13 schools serve 6,212 students as of the 2010–11 school year. It was formed in 1969 from the merger of the Elizabeth City Schools and the Pasquotank County Schools systems.

== History ==
The move towards merging the two school systems was approved by the North Carolina General Assembly in 1967. The separate school systems of Elizabeth City and Pasquotank County completed their merger in 1969.

== Student demographics ==
For the 2010–2011 school year, Elizabeth City-Pasquotank Public Schools had a total population of 6,212 students and 445.64 teachers on a full-time equivalent (FTE) basis. This produced a student-teacher ratio of 13.94:1. That same year, out of the student total, the gender ratio was 51% male to 49% female. The demographic group makeup was: White, 48%; Black, 44%; Hispanic, 5%; Asian/Pacific Islander, 1%; and American Indian, 0% (two or more races: 3%). For the same school year, 58.87% of the students received free and reduced-cost lunches.

== Governance ==
The primary governing body of Elizabeth City-Pasquotank Public Schools follows a council–manager government format with a seven-member Board of Education appointing a Superintendent to run the day-to-day operations of the system. The school system currently resides in the North Carolina State Board of Education's First District.

=== Board of education ===
The seven members of the Board of Education generally meet on the last Monday of each month. The current members of the board are:

- Sharon Warden (chair)
- Pam Pureza (Vice-chair)
- George Archuleta
- Virginia Housten
- Daniel Spence
- Rodney Walton
- Shelia H. Williams

=== Superintendent ===
The current interim superintendent of the system is Rhonda James-Davis.

== Member schools ==
Elizabeth City-Pasquotank Public Schools has thirteen schools ranging from pre-kindergarten to twelfth grade. Those twelve schools are separated into four high schools, two middle schools, and seven elementary schools. All schools have an Elizabeth City address.

=== High schools ===
- Elizabeth City Pasquotank Early College
- H. L. Trigg Community School; alternative, grades 6–12
- Northeastern High School
- Pasquotank County High School

=== Middle schools ===
- Elizabeth City Middle School
- River Road Middle School

=== Elementary schools ===
- Central Elementary School
- J. C. Sawyer Elementary School
- Northside Elementary School
- P. W. Moore Elementary School
- Pasquotank Elementary School
- Sheep-Harney Elementary School
- Weeksville Elementary School

== Athletics ==
According to the North Carolina High School Athletic Association, for the 2012–2013 school year:

- Northeastern and Pasquotank high schools are both 2A schools in the Northeastern Coastal Conference.
- Trigg Community School doesn't have athletic teams.

== See also ==
- List of school districts in North Carolina
