= 2007 CIAA basketball tournament =

The 2007 CIAA basketball tournament took place between February 26 and March 3, 2007 in Charlotte, North Carolina at the Charlotte Bobcats Arena.

Elizabeth City State won the men's championship securing a spot in the NCAA men's Division II basketball championship, and North Carolina Central won the women's championship to advance to the NCAA women's Division II women's basketball championship.

== Men's bracket ==
=== Play-in round ===
- Wed Feb 28
  - 8 NC Central def. 9 Saint Paul's 75-74
  - 7 Elizabeth City State def. 10 Livingstone 71-54
  - 6 Bowie State def. 11 Shaw 82-65

Quarterfinals; Thu Mar 1
1	Virginia Union	79
8	NC Central	68
4	St. Augustine's	61
5	Fayetteville State	60
3	Johnson C. Smith	62
6	Bowie State	68
2	Virginia State	55
7	Elizabeth City State	57

Semifinals; Fri Mar 2
1	Virginia Union	55
4	St. Augustine's	53
6	Bowie State	54
7	Elizabeth City State	59

Finals; Sat Mar 3
1	Virginia Union	60
7	Elizabeth City State	63

== Women's bracket ==
=== Play-in round ===
- Mon Feb 26
  - 8 Virginia State def. 9 Virginia Union 57-46
  - 10 Saint Paul's def. 7 Livingstone 58-56
  - 6 Johnson C. Smith def. 11 Saint Augustine's 58-45

Quarterfinals; Tue Feb 27
1	NC Central	75
8	Virginia State	41
2	Fayetteville State	68
7	Bowie State	76
3	St. Augustine's	47
6	Johnson C. Smith	58
4	Elizabeth City State	77
5	Shaw	61

Semifinals; Fri Mar 2
1	NC Central	76
5	Bowie State	65
6	Johnson C. Smith	52
7	Elizabeth City State	55

Finals; Sat Mar 3
1	NC Central	89
7	Elizabeth City State	72
