= Charlie Baggett =

American football player and coach (born 1953)

Profile
- Position: Quarterback

Personal information
- Born: January 21, 1953 (age 73); Fayetteville, North Carolina, U.S.

Career information
- High school: E. E. Smith (North Carolina)
- College: North Carolina (1971–1972); Michigan State (1973–1975)

Career history

Playing
- Hamilton Tiger-Cats (1976)

Coaching
- Bowling Green (1977) Offensive backfield coach; Bowling Green (1978) Defensive ends coach; Bowling Green (1979–1980) Offensive backfield coach; Minnesota (1981–1982) Wide receivers coach; Michigan State (1983–1984) Wide receivers coach; Michigan State (1985) Running back coach; Michigan State (1986–1987) Wide receivers coach; Michigan State (1988–1989) Running back coach; Michigan State (1990–1992) Wide receivers coach; Houston Oilers (1993–1994) Wide receivers coach; Michigan State (1995–1998) Associate head coach & wide receivers coach; Green Bay Packers (1999) Wide receivers coach; Minnesota Vikings (2000–2004) Wide receivers coach; Miami Dolphins (2005–2006) Assistant head coach & wide receivers coach; Washington (2007–2008) Wide receivers coach; St. Louis Rams (2009) Wide receivers coach; Tennessee (2010–2012) Assistant head coach & wide receivers coach

Charlie Baggett (born January 21, 1953), also known as Charles Baggett, is an American football coach and former player.

== Early life and playing career ==
Baggett was born on January 21, 1953, in Fayetteville, North Carolina. He attended E. E. Smith High School in Fayetteville, before enrolling at the University of North Carolina at Chapel Hill. Baggett later transferred to Michigan State University where he played quarterback on the football team. In 1974, he helped lead Michigan State to a 7–3–1 record while throwing for 965 yards with 10 TD. He would also run for 748 yards and 11 TD that year while masterminding an option offensive attack. His senior year in 1975 was a bit of a disappointment; despite going 7–4 he threw for just 854 yards with 4 TDs while rushing for 645 yards and 7 TDs. Baggett played one season (1976) with the CFL's Hamilton Tiger-Cats.

== Coaching career ==
Baggett served as wide receivers and running backs coach of the Bowling Green Falcons from 1977 to 1980 and wide receivers coach of the Minnesota Golden Gophers from 1981 to 1982, before being named wide receivers and running backs coach of the Michigan State Spartans. His first coaching job in the National Football League was with the Houston Oilers from 1993 to 1994. He later returned to Michigan State, staying there from 1995 to 1998. In 1999, he returned to the NFL as wide receivers coach of the Green Bay Packers, later holding the same position with the Minnesota Vikings and later became assistant head coach and offensive coordinator and wide receivers coach of the Miami Dolphins. From 2007 to 2008 he was wide receivers coach of the Washington Huskies before returning once again to the NFL in the same position with the St. Louis Rams. In 2010, he was hired as assistant head coach and wide receivers coach of the Tennessee Volunteers.

== Personal life ==
Baggett is married with one child.
