= Dimitrius Underwood =

American gridiron football player (born 1977)

No. 91
- Position: Defensive tackle

Personal information
- Born: March 29, 1977 (age 49); Philadelphia, Pennsylvania, U.S.
- Listed height: 6 ft 6 in (1.98 m)
- Listed weight: 312 lb (142 kg)

Career information
- High school: E. E. Smith (Fayetteville, North Carolina)
- College: Michigan State
- NFL draft: 1999: 1st round, 29th overall pick

Career history
- Minnesota Vikings (1999)*; Miami Dolphins (1999); Dallas Cowboys (2000–2001); Ottawa Renegades (2005)*
- * Offseason or practice squad member only

Career NFL statistics
- Games played: 19
- Tackles: 21
- Sacks: 4
- Stats at Pro Football Reference

Dimitrius Paul Underwood (born March 29, 1977) is an American former professional football player who was a defensive tackle in the National Football League (NFL) for the Miami Dolphins, and Dallas Cowboys. He played college football at Michigan State University.

== Early life ==
Underwood was born in Philadelphia on March 29, 1977, the youngest child of Paul, a former insurance salesman, and Eileen, an information specialist at IBM. The family would move to upstate New York, and later to his father's hometown of Fayetteville, North Carolina, after Eileen was laid off from her job.

He attended E.E. Smith High School. As a senior defensive tackle, he posted 87 tackles and 10 sacks, receiving honorable-mention All-state and All-Cape Fear Region honors. He also practiced wrestling, finishing second in his weight class at the 1993 state meet.

== College career ==
Underwood accepted a football scholarship from Michigan State University, to play under head coach Nick Saban. He was a reserve player as a true freshman, appearing in 11 games and making 9 tackles. He became a starter at left defensive end as a sophomore, tallying 37 tackles (8 for loss) and 5 sacks.

As a junior, he started all but one game at left defensive end, recording 57 tackles, 12 tackles for loss (second on the team), 8 sacks (second on the team), 2 forced fumbles, and one fumble recovery. He had 9 tackles (3 for loss), 2 sacks, and one pass defended against Indiana University. He finished the season with 7 tackles, one sack, and 2 forced fumbles in the Aloha Bowl against the University of Washington.

He missed his senior season because of a sprained right ankle injury, although it has been speculated that it was not the real reason.

== Professional career ==
=== Minnesota Vikings ===
Underwood was selected by the Minnesota Vikings in the first round (29th overall) of the 1999 NFL draft, after his stock rose with his pre-draft workouts. On August 1, he signed a five-year, $5.3 million contract with a $1.7 million bonus. He walked out of training camp the next day on August 2, after the first practice. On August 13, he was waived and forfeited a $1.75 million bonus saying he could not resolve the conflict between playing football and serving his Christian faith.

=== Miami Dolphins ===
On August 16, 1999, Underwood was claimed off waivers by the Miami Dolphins as 23 teams passed on him. He was signed for $395,000, then played in only one preseason game before injuring his shoulder, while also showing a lack of focus on football. Multiple times during team meetings, Underwood was found not taking notes, but instead writing about the apocalypse. He only played in the last preseason game against the Green Bay Packers, suffering a dislocated left shoulder.

Although he made the team, he was deactivated for the first 2 games because of his injury. In September, Underwood was arrested by police for failure to pay child support for his 17-month-old twins. Underwood cut his own throat and ran down a street in Lansing, Michigan. Following the team's bye week, he was placed on the reserve/non-football injury list on September 28.

Underwood later spent two months in protective care and was diagnosed with bipolar disorder. After he escaped from a psychiatric care facility, he was released by the Dolphins on December 17.

=== Dallas Cowboys ===
On March 10, 2000, he signed a two-year contract with the Dallas Cowboys, who took a chance on him because of the earlier success the team had with Alonzo Spellman, who also suffered from bipolar disorder. He was moved from defensive end to defensive tackle and was a backup player. He collected 23 tackles (one for loss), 4 sacks, and 14 quarterback pressures (led the team).

In January 2001, he tried to kill himself for the second time by running into traffic twice on a busy suburban highway. During the season he appeared in 4 games, making 3 tackles, 2 quarterback pressures, and one pass defended. He was released in October after he missed practices and was admitted to a psychiatric hospital.

=== Ottawa Renegades (CFL) ===
On May 24, 2005, he resurfaced in the Canadian Football League with the Ottawa Renegades, after four years out of football. However, he was cut during the preseason on June 13.

== Struggles with bipolar disorder ==
Starting in 2002, he served stints in the Dallas County Jail for aggravated robbery on a paraplegic driver, assault on a police officer, and evading arrest. He spent his time in a closed custody cell. In February 2003, Underwood was transferred from Lew Sterrett Justice Center to the North Texas State Hospital in Vernon.

In April 2004, Underwood was arrested for refusing to get out of his stalled car on a highway. He was taken to Parkland Memorial Hospital.

In 2007, Underwood entered the Philadelphia Industrial Correctional Center, and left in February 2011.

== Personal life ==
A few months after Underwood enrolled at Michigan State University, his father died from leukemia at the age of 47.

In a September 28, 2010 article, Yahoo Sports noted Underwood's mental health issues as a case in point in regard to the NFL falling short in helping players who suffer from various mental illnesses that are in no small part connected to the pressures of the job of an NFL athlete. The 2010 article also pointed out that "Underwood was tormented by visions of the apocalypse. He used to write notes discussing the end of the world on pieces of paper the size of postage stamps. When he was in a normal state, he could be engaging in conversation. He was funny and intelligent. He also exuded physical confidence and had extraordinary talent."
