= Aaron Curry (American football) =

American football player and coach (born 1986)

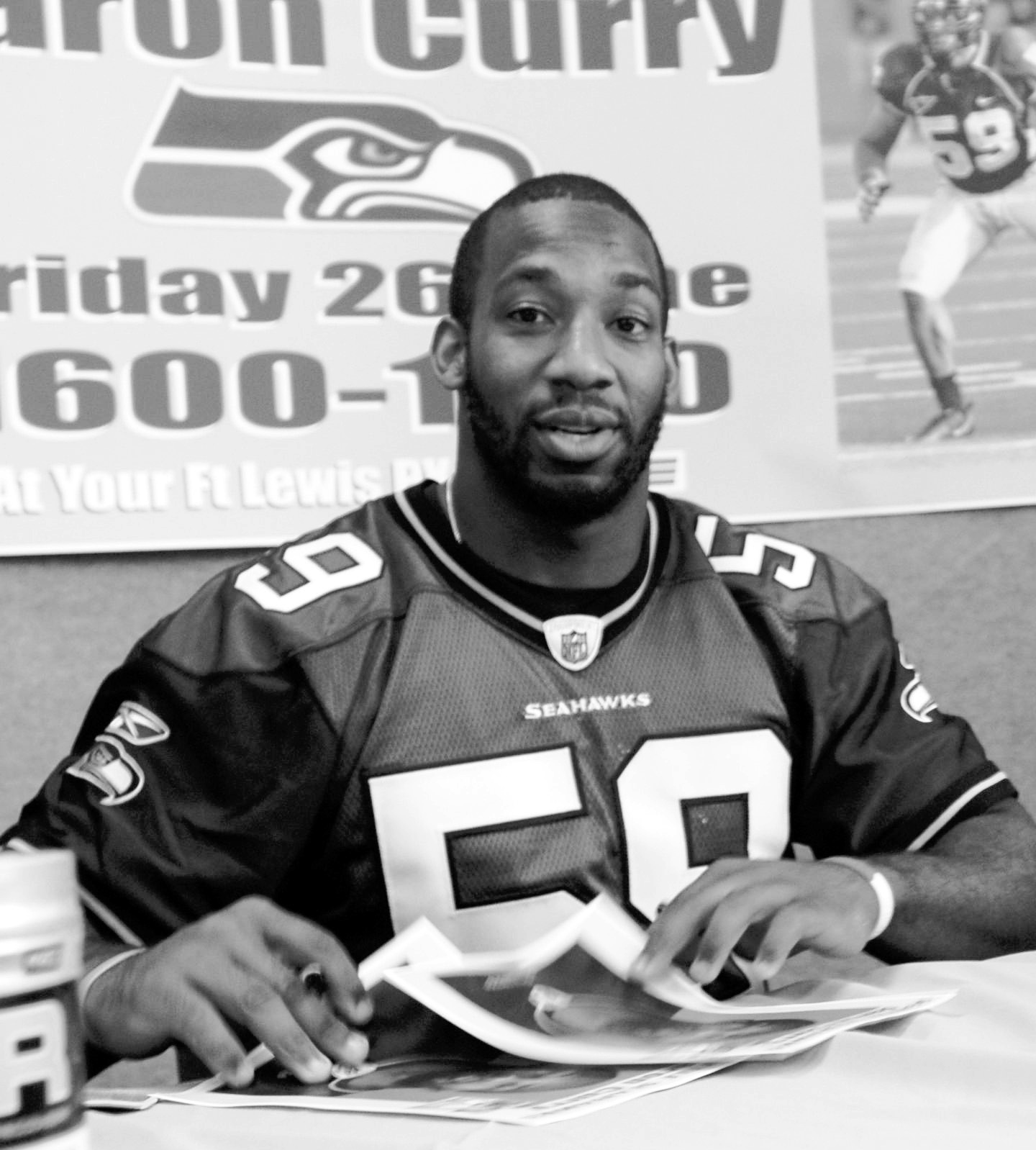
- Curry with the Seattle Seahawks in 2009

Personal information
- Born: April 6, 1986 (age 40); Fayetteville, North Carolina, U.S.
- Listed height: 6 ft 2 in (1.88 m)
- Listed weight: 255 lb (116 kg)

Career information
- Position: Linebacker (No. 59, 51)
- High school: E. E. Smith (Fayetteville)
- College: Wake Forest (2005–2008)
- NFL draft: 2009: 1st round, 4th overall pick

Career history

Playing
- Seattle Seahawks (2009–2011); Oakland Raiders (2011–2012); New York Giants (2013)*
- * Offseason or practice squad member only

Coaching
- Charlotte (2013) Strength and conditioning intern; Charlotte (2014) Graduate assistant; Charlotte (2015–2018) Defensive line coach; Seattle Seahawks (2019) Coaching assistant; Seattle Seahawks (2020–2022) Defensive assistant; Pittsburgh Steelers (2023–2024) Inside linebackers coach; New York Jets (2025) Linebackers coach

Awards and highlights
- Butkus Award (2008); First-team All-American (2008); First-team All-ACC (2008); Second-team All-ACC (2007)

Career NFL statistics
- Total tackles: 244
- Sacks: 5.5
- Forced fumbles: 4
- Fumble recoveries: 4
- Defensive touchdowns: 1
- Stats at Pro Football Reference

Aaron Curry (born April 6, 1986) is an American professional football coach and former linebacker who most recently served as the linebackers coach for the New York Jets of the National Football League (NFL). Curry was selected by the Seattle Seahawks in the first round (fourth overall) in the 2009 NFL draft out of Wake Forest. Curry also played for the Oakland Raiders in 2011 and 2012.

== Early life ==
Curry attended E. E. Smith High School in Fayetteville, North Carolina. While there he played linebacker and tight end. He earned all-conference and all-region honors and was the conference's defensive player of the year as a senior after recording 123 tackles. He was also selected to the North Carolina–South Carolina Shrine Bowl as a tight end.

Considered only a two-star recruit by both Rivals and Scout.com, Curry chose to play college football at Wake Forest over East Carolina, the only two scholarships he was offered. Curry said he chose Wake Forest in part because it was two hours from home, but mostly for revenge. "Anybody who passed me up, I was going to punish them. That's why I chose the ACC, [because] those schools like Carolina, Duke, and North Carolina State were right around the corner, and I wasn't wanted by any of them."

== College career ==
He played an on-the-ball 'Sam' linebacker [at Wake Forest], which not a lot of people play anymore. You have to be really strong. But they also put him out in space ... almost like a nickelback. Those are two almost mutually exclusive skill sets.

— Detroit Lions head coach Jim Schwartz on Curry.

As a freshman in 2005 he started 10 of 11 games and was the team's fifth leading tackler with 39. After his great season he was named second-team Freshman All-American and ACC All-Freshman Team by the Sporting News. As a sophomore in 2006 he started all 14 games at outside linebacker, finishing second on the team in tackles with 83. Curry's breakout season came as a junior in 2007. During the season, he tied the NCAA record for the most interception returns for touchdown in a season by a linebacker with three. He also broke the school record with 226 interception return yards. He finished the season second on the team and 13th in the ACC in tackles with 99, and earned Second-team All-ACC honors and second-team All-America honors from CollegeSportsReport.com. Curry seriously considered entering the 2008 NFL draft to provide for his family, but later chose to return.

In his senior season, he had 105 tackles, including 16 for a loss, and was the winner of the Butkus Award. Curry was also selected an All-American by ESPN, Pro Football Weekly, and Sports Illustrated.

Curry graduated in 2009 with a bachelor's degree in sociology.

=== Awards and honors ===
- Sporting News Freshman All-ACC 2005)
- Sporting News Freshman All-American (2005)
- Second-team All-ACC (2007)
- First-team All-ACC (2008)
- First-team All-American (2008)
- Butkus Award (2008)

== Playing career ==
=== Pre-draft ===
Curry was widely believed to be the best linebacker available in the 2009 NFL Draft. Considered a "safe pick", he was even in the debate for the No. 1 pick overall—which would've made him the first linebacker selected first overall since Aundray Bruce in 1988. ESPN's Mel Kiper, Jr. compared Curry to Keith Bulluck.

Pre-draft measurables
Height	Weight	Arm length	Hand span	40-yard dash	10-yard split	20-yard split	20-yard shuttle	Three-cone drill	Vertical jump	Broad jump	Bench press	Wonderlic
6 ft 1 3/4 in (1.87 m)	254 lb (115 kg)	32 5/8 in (0.83 m)	9 3/4 in (0.25 m)	4.56 s	1.61 s	2.67 s	4.51 s	7.15 s	37 in (0.94 m)	10 ft 4 in (3.15 m)	25 reps	26
All values from NFL Combine

=== Seattle Seahawks ===
Curry was selected in the first round with the fourth overall pick by the Seattle Seahawks in the 2009 NFL draft. He was the highest drafted linebacker since LaVar Arrington went second overall in the 2000 NFL draft to the Washington Redskins, and the highest Wake Forest Demon Deacon since Norm Snead went second overall to the Washington Redskins in the 1961 NFL draft.

On August 8, 2009, Curry signed a six-year, $60 million contract including $34 million guaranteed, the most money ever guaranteed to a non-quarterback rookie in NFL history.

Curry became the starting strongside linebacker for the Seahawks immediately. In his first career game against the St. Louis Rams he recorded four tackles. He recorded his first career sack against Chicago Bears quarterback Jay Cutler in week 3.

In 2009, Curry recorded 61 tackles and 2 sacks, and in 2010, he compiled 73 tackles and 3.5 sacks. In 2011, he lost his starting position to rookie K. J. Wright after just two starts. Since he failed to meet the expectations of a high draft pick, Curry is widely considered to be a draft bust.

=== Oakland Raiders ===
Curry was traded to the Oakland Raiders on October 12, 2011, in exchange for a seventh-round draft pick in 2012 and a conditional pick in 2013. On November 16, 2012, Curry was fined $23,625 for two offenses against the Baltimore Ravens. On November 20, Curry was waived by the Raiders after spending all but two weeks of the season on the physically unable to perform (PUP) list.

=== New York Giants ===
Curry signed a one-year contract with the New York Giants on May 10, 2013. On August 25, the Giants released Curry to trim down the 75-man roster. On August 28, Curry retired from the NFL.

=== NFL statistics ===
Year	Team	GP	COMB	TOTAL	AST	SACK	FF	FR	FR YDS	INT	IR YDS	AVG IR	LNG	TD	PD
2009	SEA	14	61	54	7	2.0	2	0	0	0	0	0	0	0	6
2010	SEA	16	73	60	13	3.5	2	0	0	0	0	0	0	0	1
2011	SEA	5	22	16	6	0.0	0	0	0	0	0	0	0	0	2
2011	OAK	11	46	32	14	0.0	0	2	6	0	0	0	0	0	3
2012	OAK	2	1	1	0	0.0	0	0	0	0	0	0	0	0	0
Career		48	203	163	40	5.5	4	2	0	0	0	0	0	0	12

== Coaching career ==
=== Charlotte 49ers ===
Just weeks after retiring from his playing career, Curry joined the Charlotte 49ers coaching staff under his former college linebackers coach Brad Lambert, spending the 2013 season as a strength and conditioning intern. In 2014, Curry became a graduate assistant, working with Charlotte’s linebackers. The next year, he was promoted to defensive line coach.

=== Seattle Seahawks ===
Curry joined the Seahawks coaching staff on March 11, 2020 as a defensive assistant after spending the 2019 season as a coaching assistant.

=== Pittsburgh Steelers ===
On February 22, 2023, Curry was hired as an inside linebackers coach by the Pittsburgh Steelers.

=== New York Jets ===
On January 31, 2025, the New York Jets hired Curry to serve as their linebackers coach. On January 23, 2026, Curry was fired by the Jets.

== Personal ==
Curry is the son of former Detroit Lions and Baltimore Colts defensive back Reggie Pinkney; he has had a minimal relationship with his father. His brother is former NFL linebacker Eric Barton.

Curry currently resides in North Carolina.
