= T. J. Bryan =

American academic administrator

T. J. (Thelma Jane) Bryan is an American educator who rose from poverty in rural Maryland to become the first African-American woman to be elected by the University of North Carolina Board of Governors to serve as Chancellor of one of its constituent institutions.

== Early life and education ==
Born on August 21, 1945, Bryan is one of six daughters born in Scotland, Maryland, to Joseph Webster Bryan and Mary Gertrude Bryan (née Holley). Neither Joseph nor Mary Bryan completed high school, but significantly two of their daughters (T. J. Bryan and Myrtle Elizabeth Bryan Dorsey) earned doctoral degrees and became higher-education chancellors—Bryan at Fayetteville State University (FSU) and Dorsey at Baton Rouge Community College and at St. Louis Community College. While Bryan served as FSU Chancellor, she established the Mary and Joseph Bryan Nursing Scholarship in honor of her parents.

A low-income, first-generation college student, Bryan earned a Bachelor of Arts degree in English from Morgan State College; she graduated as valedictorian of her class in 1970. She earned a Master of Arts degree in English from Morgan in 1974 and a Ph.D. in English language and literature from the University of Maryland at College Park in 1982.

== Professional beginnings ==
From 1978 to 1998, Bryan was a faculty member at Baltimore's Coppin State College (later University), where she rose to the rank of full professor. While at Coppin, she revised and directed the honors program and founded and directed one of the nation's fourteen original Ronald McNair Post-Baccalaureate Achievement Programs. Also, during this period, she served in progressively more complex academic-administrative roles—as Chair of the Department of Languages, Literature, and Journalism for three years; Dean of the Honors Division for eight years; and Dean of Arts and Sciences for seven years. One of the most significant national recognitions of her strengths during this period was her selection as the only recipient in the state of Maryland of a 1986-87 Fellowship for College Teachers from the National Endowment for the Humanities.

From 1998 to 2002, Bryan was Associate Vice Chancellor for Academic Affairs at the University System of Maryland. Four years later, in 2002, she became Vice Chancellor for Academic and Student Affairs at the Pennsylvania State System of Higher Education.

== Fayetteville State University ==
In June 2003, Bryan made history when she became the first woman elected by the UNC Board of Governors (BoG) to serve as Chancellor of Fayetteville State University. Bryan was also the first African-American woman elected by the BoG to lead a UNC institution.

Under Bryan's leadership, FSU made significant strides. The university developed its 2006-2011 strategic plan, its academic-strategic plan, and its facilities-master plan. During her chancellorship, enrollment at FSU grew from 5,329 students in fall 2003 to 6,692 students in fall 2007. Of special note is the 36% rise in the enrollment of Latino/Hispanic students, North Carolina's fastest-growing population group. Enrollment in distance-education courses quadrupled, growth that catapulted FSU into third place in such enrollment in the UNC. The university established dual-enrollment arrangements with fourteen community colleges throughout the state.

Also, the university made advances in academic-program quality and quantity. The percentage of full-time faculty with doctoral or first-professional degrees rose from 69% in 2003 to 90% in 2007. Bryan encouraged departments to seek specialized accreditations. In December 2006, FSU's School of Business and Economics was granted accreditation by the prestigious Association to Advance Collegiate Schools of Business. The Princeton Review's designation of the FSU MBA Program as one of the "Best 296 Business Schools: 2009 Edition" is an outgrowth of the emphasis placed on high academic standards during Bryan's chancellorship. Also, FSU was awarded initial accreditation by the Council on Social Work Education, continuing accreditation by the National Council for Accreditation of Teacher Education, and initial accreditation by the Commission on Collegiate Nursing Education. After her departure, the undergraduate program in computer science earned ABET accreditation—a pursuit that began during her chancellorship. Under Bryan's leadership, FSU signed seven memoranda of understanding with Asian universities and constructed a new state-of-the-art language lab that was one of the best in the UNC system and the nation. In fall 2004, the university established an honors program. From 2003 to 2007, FSU added ten bachelor's and two master's programs. New bachelor's programs included art education, biotechnology, communications, fire science, forensic science, generic nursing, and management-information systems. Master's programs in teaching and in criminal justice were added during her chancellorship.

Bryan was instrumental in the development of key community partnerships. During her tenure, award-winning Cross Creek Early College High School, a Cumberland County (NC) public high school located on the university campus, was launched, and Fayetteville Fire Station #14, serving the university's surrounding community, was constructed on the campus. An award-winning 2+2+2 collaboration among the university's fire-sciences program, the city of Fayetteville, area community colleges, and a local public high school was formed while she served as Chancellor. Beginning in 2006, FSU collaborated with the University of North Carolina-Pembroke to win Department of Defense funding for an electron microprobe, one of the few such instruments nationally on university campuses.

From 2003 to 2007, FSU made progress in other areas. Community-engagement activities increased. FSU Focus, Bryan's weekly radio show; the Chancellor's Distinguished Speakers' Series; and the FSU Community Advisory Council were three such initiatives that were launched. Non-state funding increased. Private donations doubled, and funding from grants grew almost threefold. Employee and student satisfaction increased.

A week before her departure in 2007, FSU hosted a tribute honoring Bryan. Approximately 1,000 persons attended this event over which the President of the FSU National Alumni Association and the President of the FSU Student Government Association presided. The FSU Board of Trustees, the FSU National Alumni Association, and the Cumberland County (NC) Commissioners presented her with tokens of their appreciation.

== Life after retirement ==
After retiring from FSU, Bryan pursued volunteer activities, running, writing, and piano studies. In her first eight months as a runner, Bryan participated in eleven races and placed first, second, or third in her division in 64% of them. In her first marathon, she qualified, at age 64, for the 2011 Boston Marathon. Improving her marathon time by seventeen minutes during the 2011 Boston Marathon, she qualified for the 2012 Boston Marathon.

Bryan resides in Maryland with her husband, David George Preston, whom she wed on March 17, 1980. They have one son, Bryan David Preston, who was born on June 3, 1981.
