= Crawford Palmer =

French-American basketball player

Personal information
- Born: 14 September 1970 (age 56) Ithaca, New York, U.S.
- Listed height: 6 ft 9 in (2.06 m)
- Listed weight: 225 lb (102 kg)

Career information
- High school: Washington-Lee (Arlington, Virginia)
- College: Duke (1988–1991); Dartmouth (1992–1993)
- NBA draft: 1993: undrafted
- Playing career: 1993–2006
- Position: Center

Career highlights
- NCAA champion (1991); McDonald's All-American (1988); Third-team Parade All-American (1988)
Medals
Representing France
Men's basketball
Olympic Games
| Silver medal – second place | 2000 Sydney | National team |

Henry Crawford Palmer (born September 14, 1970) is a French-American men's basketball player formerly with Strasbourg IG in France and the French men's national basketball team. Palmer, born in Ithaca, New York, attended Duke University from 1988 to 1991, then transferred to Dartmouth College. Palmer won a silver medal at the 2000 Summer Olympics playing for France.
