= Pasquotank County High School =

American public school in North Carolina

Location
- 1064 Northside Road; Elizabeth City, North Carolina 27909; United States; 36°21′55″N 76°16′25″W

Information
- Other name: P-TANK
- Type: Public
- Established: 2000 (26 years ago)
- School district: Elizabeth City-Pasquotank Public Schools
- CEEB code: 341144
- Principal: Juvanda Crutch
- Teaching staff: 33.46 (FTE)
- Grades Served: 9–12
- Enrollment: 653 (2024–2025)
- Student to teacher ratio: 19.52
- Colors: Navy blue and silver
- Mascot: Panther
- Website: pchs.ecpps.k12.nc.us

Pasquotank County High School (PCHS) is a school in Elizabeth City, Pasquotank County, North Carolina, United States. PCHS's mascot is the Panther. Its school colors are navy blue and silver. It is one of three high schools in the Elizabeth City-Pasquotank Public Schools system; the other being (sometimes considered a rival) Northeastern High School.

PCHS was established in 2000 to relieve the student population of Northeastern High School; however, all members of the senior class of 2001 remained at Northeastern, making the class of 2002 the first graduating class of Pasquotank County High School. The class of 2004 was the first group of students to start at Pasquotank County as freshmen and graduate, spending all four years as PCHS Panthers.

== Campus ==
The school is in a complex with two other schools, the new ECMS (Elizabeth City Middle School) building, and Northside Elementary School. Serving a total student population of 4,102

== Administration history ==
=== Patti Hamler (2000–2007) ===
Patti Hamler was the first Principal at PCHS opening the school in 2000. Hamler was the Elizabeth City-Pasquotank Public Schools Principal of the Year for 2003. Hamler left to become principal of Leesville Road Middle School in Wake County, North Carolina at the conclusion of the 2006–07 school year.

=== Cynthia Morris (2007–2008) ===
Cynthia Morris, who was an Assistant Principal at PCHS, served as interim principal for the Fall 2007 semester. In June 2008 it was announced that Morris would become the principal at Elizabeth City Middle School.

=== Amy Fyffe (2008–2017) ===
Amy Fyffe was named school principal at Pasquotank County High School beginning with the Spring 2008 semester. She was formerly a teacher and assistant principal at Northeastern High School. Fyffe was named the 2011 Elizabeth City-Pasquotank Public Schools principal of the year. At the end of the 2016–2017 school year it was announced that Fyffe would take up the principal position at the newly established Elizabeth City-Pasquotank Public Schools early college located on the campus of College of the Albemarle

=== Brian Ruffin (August 2017–November 2017) ===
Brian Ruffin was named school principal at Pasquotank County High School beginning with the Fall 2017 semester. He is coming to Pasquotank County High School from Hertford County Early College High School in Ahoskie, where he was school principal. He was removed from the position near the end of the Fall 2017 semester. It was reported that he was on "Self-Selective Sick leave"

== Sports ==
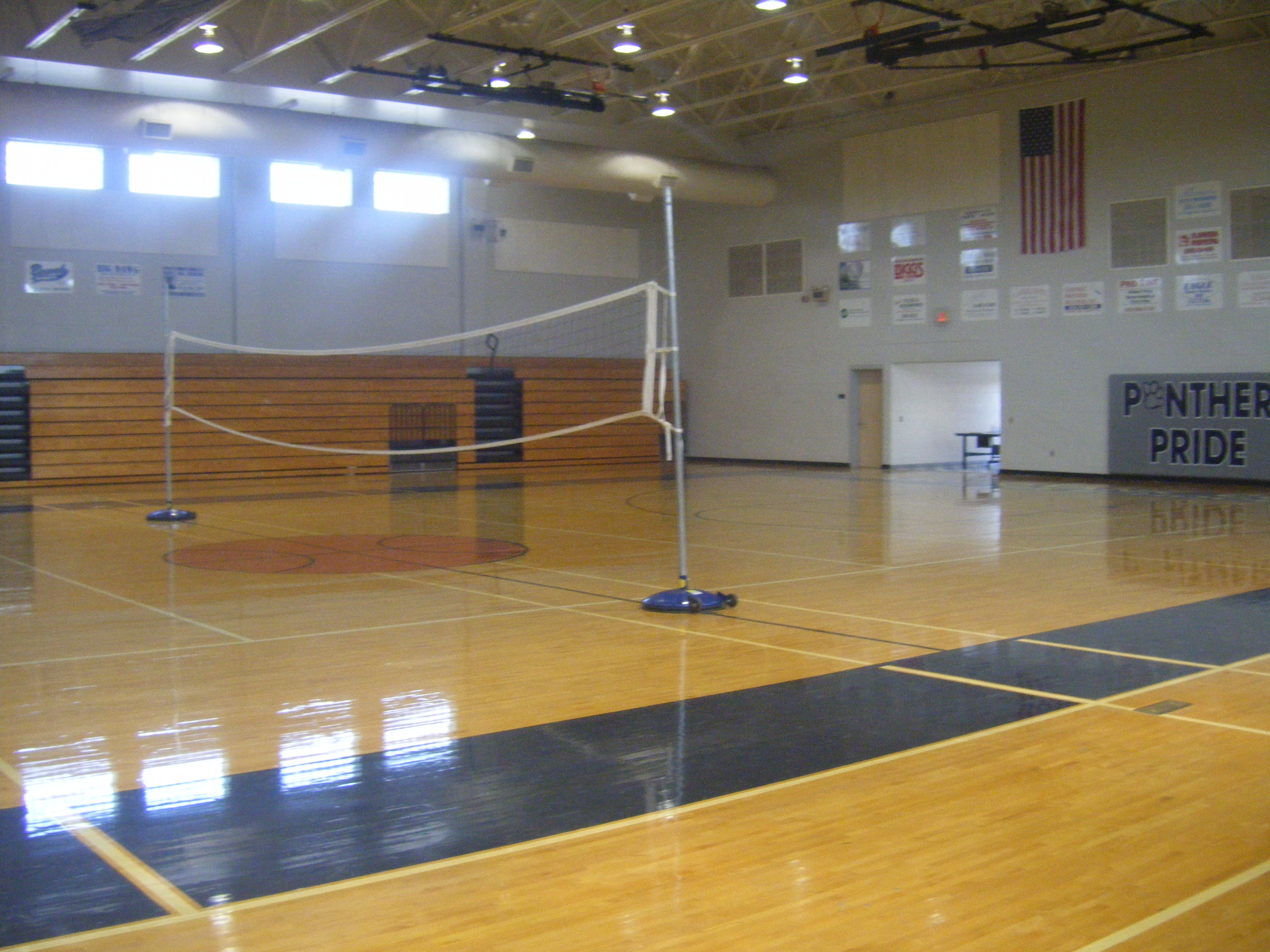

The school offers baseball, football, volleyball, track and field, tennis, golf, basketball, wrestling, soccer, and many other sports.

== School clubs ==
The school offers the clubs: Future Business Leaders of America, Family, Career, and Community Leaders of America, Future Farmers of America, National Honors Society, Drama Club, and many more.
