= Orange Street School =

Historic school building in North Carolina, United States

- U.S. National Register of Historic Places
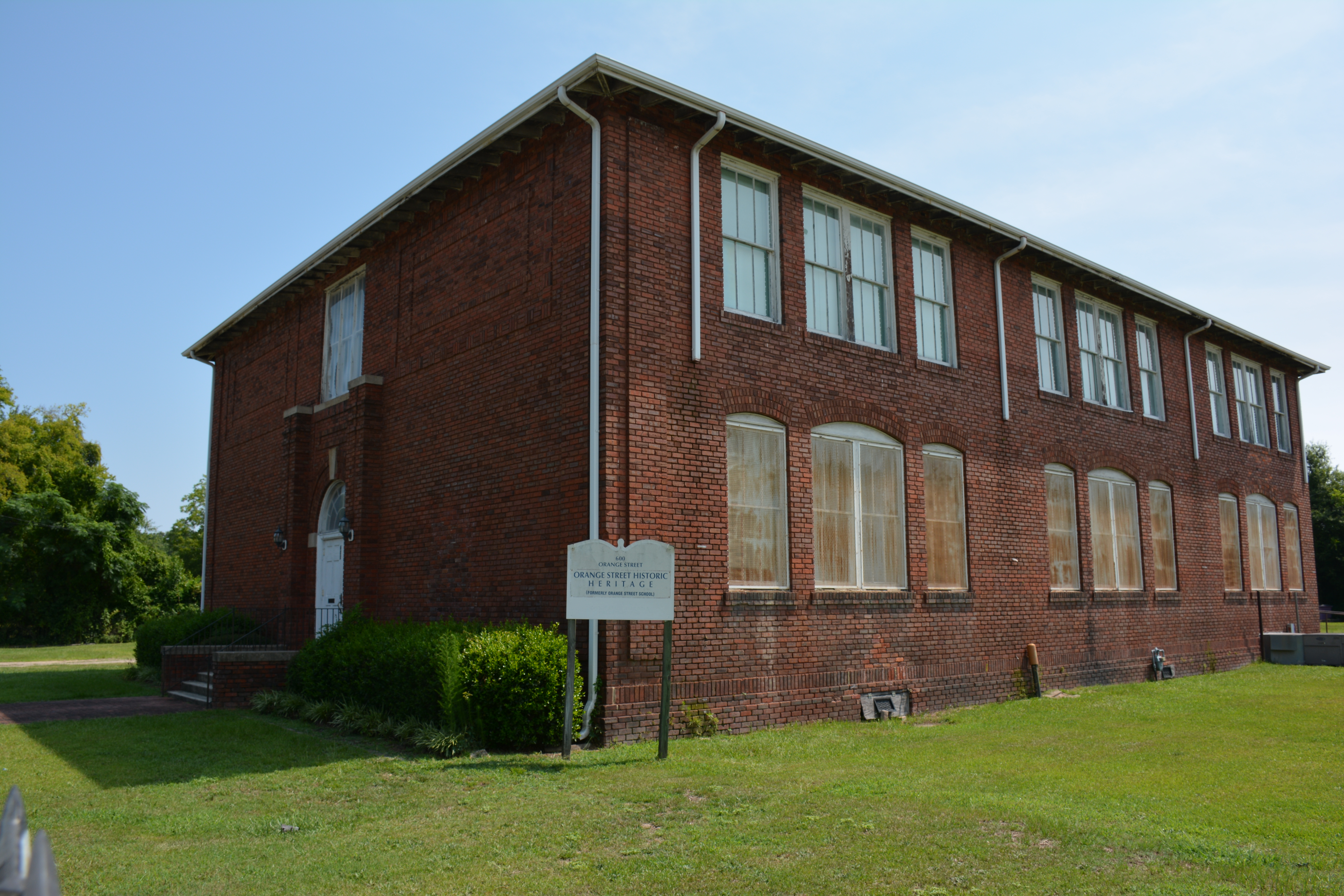

- Location within North Carolina Location within the United States
- Location: 500 blk. of Orange St., jct. of Orange and Chance Sts., Fayetteville, North Carolina
- Coordinates: 35°3′50″N 78°52′49″W
- Area: 1.2 acres (0.49 ha)
- Built: 1915
- Built by: Waddell, James
- Architectural style: Classical Revival, Utilitarian Industrial
- NRHP reference No.: 87001597
- Added to NRHP: September 22, 1987

Orange Street School is a historic school building located at Fayetteville, Cumberland County, North Carolina. It was built about 1915 for African-American students, and is a two-story, approximately square brick building, three bays wide and three bays deep, with Neoclassical style detailing. It was the original home of E. E. Smith High School from 1927 to 1929 and 1931 to 1940.

It was listed on the National Register of Historic Places in 1987.
