= Anthony Smith (defensive end, born 1967) =

American serial killer and former football player

No. 94, 75
- Position: Defensive end

Personal information
- Born: June 28, 1967 (age 59); Elizabeth City, North Carolina, U.S.
- Listed height: 6 ft 3 in (1.91 m)
- Listed weight: 265 lb (120 kg)

Career information
- High school: Northeastern (Elizabeth City)
- College: Arizona
- NFL draft: 1990: 1st round, 11th overall pick

Career history
- Los Angeles/Oakland Raiders (1990–1997); Denver Broncos (1998)*
- * Offseason or practice squad member only

Career NFL statistics
- Tackles: 228
- Sacks: 57.5
- Safeties: 1
- Stats at Pro Football Reference

Anthony Wayne Smith (born June 28, 1967) is an American former professional NFL football player and convicted serial killer. He was selected by the Raiders 11th overall in the 1990 NFL draft. He played college football in Arizona and Alabama.

After retiring from professional sports, Smith was convicted of multiple murders, including the 1999 kidnappings and killings of brothers Kevin and Ricky Nettles and the 2001 torture-murder of Dennis Henderson. In 2016, he was sentenced to three consecutive life terms without the possibility of parole.

== NFL career ==
Smith was a defensive end in the National Football League (NFL). On August 29, 1990, during practice, Smith tore the medial collateral ligament and cartilage in his right knee, causing him to miss his entire rookie season.

Following Smith's third season, he signed a four-year contract extension with the Raiders for $7.6 million. In 1997, he opted out of his contract and left the NFL following a brief practice stint with the Denver Broncos.

== Marriages ==
Smith has been married three times. His second wife was former singer–actress Denise Matthews, better known as Vanity. The marriage lasted for a year, from 1995 to 1996. In 1997, Smith was arrested for domestic violence involving another woman and sentenced to anger-management classes. In 1997, he met his third wife, Teresa Obello White.

== Firebombing charge ==
In 2003, Smith was charged with firebombing a Santa Monica, California, furniture store over a dispute with the store's owner about money and a consignment item. After two juries were unable to reach a verdict, a judge dismissed the charge.

== Murders, trials, and convictions ==
In March 2011, Smith and two others were charged with the murder of Maurilio Ponce, a mechanic, who was beaten and shot in October 2008 in Lancaster, California, with his body dumped near the Antelope Valley poppy fields some 11 miles away. Prosecutors said that the murder occurred after a business deal went wrong.

In April 2011, the jury deadlocked at 8–4 in favor of guilt. In July 2012, while awaiting retrial, Smith was charged with three other killings: the 1999 murders of brothers Kevin and Ricky Nettles, who were kidnapped from a Los Angeles car wash before being shot and their bodies dumped, and the kidnapping and fatal stabbing of Dennis Henderson in Los Angeles in June 2001.

On October 12, 2012, after a preliminary hearing, a Los Angeles County judge found sufficient evidence for Smith to stand trial for the four murders. According to testimony at trial, Smith impersonated a police detective while abducting the Nettles, who were tortured before their murder.

On November 5, 2015, after eight days of jury deliberations, Smith was convicted of the murders of Ricky and Kevin Nettles and Henderson. The jury found special circumstance — "that Smith committed kidnapping, torture, and multiple murders." The jury deadlocked 9–3 in favor of guilt on the murder of Ponce.

On January 22, 2016, Smith was sentenced to three consecutive life sentences without the possibility of parole.

== See also ==
- List of serial killers in the United States
