= Reggie Pinkney =

American football player (born 1955)

No. 42, 37
- Position: Safety

Personal information
- Born: May 27, 1955 (age 71); St. Louis, Missouri, U.S.
- Listed height: 5 ft 11 in (1.80 m)
- Listed weight: 190 lb (86 kg)

Career information
- College: East Carolina
- NFL draft: 1977: 6th round, 166th overall pick

Career history
- Detroit Lions (1977–1978); Baltimore Colts (1979–1981)

Career NFL statistics
- Interceptions: 4
- Fumble recoveries: 4
- Defensive TDs: 1
- Stats at Pro Football Reference

Vernon Reginald Pinkney (born May 27, 1955) is an American former professional football player who was a defensive back for five seasons in the National Football League (NFL). He played in the NFL for two seasons with the Detroit Lions and three with the Baltimore Colts. Pickney was selected by the Lions in the sixth round of the 1977 NFL draft, after an all-conference college football career with the East Carolina Pirates.

Pinkney was born St. Louis, Missouri, but grew up in Fort Bragg, North Carolina. He is the father of Patrick Pinkney, former quarterback at East Carolina, Chris Curry defensive back at University of North Carolina-Chapel Hill and Aaron Curry, former linebacker of the Oakland Raiders.
