= Tank Tyler =

American football player (born 1985)

No. 93
- Position: Defensive tackle

Personal information
- Born: February 14, 1985 (age 41); Fayetteville, North Carolina, U.S.
- Listed height: 6 ft 2 in (1.88 m)
- Listed weight: 325 lb (147 kg)

Career information
- High school: E. E. Smith (Fayetteville)
- College: North Carolina State
- NFL draft: 2007: 3rd round, 82nd overall pick

Career history
- Kansas City Chiefs (2007–2009); Carolina Panthers (2009); Chicago Bears (2011)*; Tampa Bay Storm (2013); Dodge City Law (2017)*
- * Offseason or practice squad member only

Awards and highlights
- First-team All-ACC (2006)

Career NFL statistics
- Total tackles: 82
- Fumble recoveries: 1
- Stats at Pro Football Reference

Career AFL statistics
- Total tackles: 15
- Sacks: 5
- Forced fumbles: 1
- Fumble recoveries: 1
- Stats at ArenaFan.com

DeMarcus Lamon "Tank" Tyler (born February 14, 1985) is an American former professional football player who was a defensive tackle in the National Football League (NFL). He was selected by the Kansas City Chiefs in the third round of the 2007 NFL draft. He played college football for the NC State Wolfpack.

Tyler was also a member of the Carolina Panthers, Chicago Bears, Tampa Bay Storm, and Dodge City Law.

== Early life ==
Tyler played high school football at E.E. Smith High in Fayetteville, North Carolina. During his career he achieved all-conference honors, first-team All-Two Rivers Class 4-A Conference, All-Cape Fear Region accolades, and was Cape Fear Region Player of the Year in 2002. He was also invited to play in the 2002 Shrine Bowl.

== College career ==
Tyler played college football at North Carolina State. During his senior season, he was received first-team All-Atlantic Coast Conference after recording 87 tackles, three sacks, and a forced fumble. He finished his college career with 173 tackles, five sacks, and two fumble recoveries.

== Professional career ==
Pre-draft measurables
Height	Weight	40-yard dash	10-yard split	20-yard split	20-yard shuttle	Three-cone drill	Vertical jump	Broad jump	Bench press
6 ft 2 in (1.88 m)	306 lb (139 kg)	5.18 s	1.75 s	2.96 s	4.76 s	7.47 s	28 in (0.71 m)	5 ft 1 in (1.55 m)	42 reps
All values from NFL Combine

=== Kansas City Chiefs ===
Tyler was selected by the Kansas City Chiefs in the third round of the 2007 NFL draft with the 82nd overall pick. He played in 15 games during his rookie season, starting one. During his second season he started all 16 games at defensive tackle for the Chiefs, recording 29 tackles. In three years with the Chiefs he started 19 of 37 games, recording 62 tackles.

=== Carolina Panthers ===
Tyler was traded to the Carolina Panthers on October 19, 2009 for a fifth round pick in the 2010 NFL draft. He was waived on September 4, 2010 during final cuts.

=== Chicago Bears ===
Tyler signed a reserve/future contract with the Chicago Bears on January 11, 2011. He was waived on August 29, 2011.
