= Robert Brickey =

American basketball coach

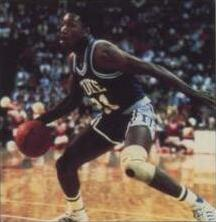
- Brickey with Duke, circa 1987

Fayetteville Stingers
- Position: Head coach
- League: The Basketball League

Personal information
- Born: December 26, 1967 (age 58) Fayetteville, North Carolina, U.S.
- Listed height: 6 ft 5 in (1.96 m)
- Listed weight: 210 lb (95 kg)

Career information
- High school: E. E. Smith (Fayetteville, North Carolina)
- College: Duke (1986–1990)
- NBA draft: 1990: undrafted
- Playing career: 1990–2000
- Coaching career: 2000–present

Career history

Coaching
- 2000–2002: Army (assistant)
- 2002–2004: SMU (assistant)
- 2004–2005: James Madison (assistant)
- 2005–2008: Shaw
- 2009–2011: North Carolina Central (assistant)
- 2011–2012: Oshawa Power
- 2018–2021: Raleigh Firebirds
- 2023: Fayetteville Stingers

Career highlights
- North Carolina Mr. Basketball (1986)

Robert Brickey (born December 26, 1967) is an American basketball coach who is currently the head coach of the Fayetteville Stingers of The Basketball League. Previously he was the head coach of the Raleigh Firebirds.

== High school career ==
Brickey attended E.E. Smith High School in Fayetteville, North Carolina, and as a junior led the Golden Bulls to the championship game, where they were defeated by Hunter Huss High School. In 1986, as a senior, Brickey was named North Carolina Mr. Basketball.

== College career ==
After graduating, he went on to play basketball at Duke from 1986 to 1990, where he was a part of three final four teams and started in the national championship game in 1990. He served as team captain in 1990 and received first team All-Atlantic Coast Conference (ACC) Tournament honors in 1988.

In the Summer of 1987, Robert Brickey won a silver medal with Team USA at the FIBA Under 19 World Championship. The Larry Brown led group finished the tournament 5–2, and lost the gold medal game to a loaded Yugoslavian team that included Vlade Divac, Dino Rada, and Toni Kukoc. On a squad that included Larry Johnson and Gary Payton, Brickey saw significant playing time, and averaged 7.0 points per game.

== Coaching career ==
From 2000 to 2002 he was an assistant at Army. He moved SMU (2002–04) and James Madison (2004–05), before taking the head coaching job at Shaw University (2005–08). Following his departure from Shaw, he was the assistant director of basketball operations at Duke University (2008–09), assistant coach at North Carolina Central University (2009–2011), head coach of the NBL Canada squad Oshawa Power (2011–2012), and assistant coach at Fayetteville State (2013–15).

In 2018, Brickey was hired as the head coach of the Raleigh Firebirds, who begin play in 2019 as part of North American Premier Basketball (NAPB).

After sitting out the 2022 season, he was hired as the head coach of the Fayetteville Stingers for the 2023 season.
