= Fayetteville State University =

Historically black college in Fayetteville, North Carolina, US

Coordinates: 35°04′19.20″N 78°53′40.20″W

- Former names: Howard School (1867–1877); State Colored Normal School (1877–1939); Fayetteville State Teachers College (1939–1963); Fayetteville State College (1963–1969)
- Motto: Res Non Verba (Latin)
- Motto in English: "Deeds not Words"
- Type: Public historically black university
- Established: November 29, 1867; 158 years ago
- Parent institution: University of North Carolina
- Accreditation: SACS
- Academic affiliations: TMCF
- Endowment: $39.5 million (2025)
- Chancellor: Darrell T. Allison, J.D.
- Faculty: 328 (Fall 2011)
- Administrative staff: 581 (Fall 2011)
- Students: 6,748 (Fall 2021)
- Undergraduates: 5,557 (Fall 2021)
- Location: Fayetteville, North Carolina, United States
- Campus: 200 acres (0.81 km^{2}); Midsize city
- Newspaper: The Voice
- Colors: Blue and white
- Nickname: Broncos
- Sporting affiliations: NCAA Division II — CIAA
- Mascot: Mr. Bronco
- Website: www.uncfsu.edu

Fayetteville State University (FSU) is a public historically black university in Fayetteville, North Carolina, United States. It is part of the University of North Carolina System and the Thurgood Marshall College Fund.

== History ==
The second oldest state-supported school in North Carolina had humble beginnings. Immediately following the Civil War in 1865, a robust education agenda was begun in Fayetteville's African American community with the founding of the Phillips and Sumner Schools for primary and intermediate learning. In 1867, the schools consolidated to form the Howard School, following the vision of the Freedmen's Bureau chief General Oliver O. Howard who erected a building on a tract of land generously donated by seven prominent African American men – Matthew N. Leary, Andrew Jackson Chesnutt, Robert Simmons, George Grainger, Thomas Lomax, Nelson Carter, and David A. Bryant – who together paid $136 for two lots on Gillespie Street in Fayetteville and formed among themselves a self-perpetuating Board of Trustees to maintain the property for the education of local Black youth.

In 1877, an act of the North Carolina legislature provided for the establishment of the first teacher-training institution for African Americans in the state. Recognized for its successful record of educating Black youth, the Howard School was selected for this designation and in that year became the State Colored Normal School and the first state-sponsored institution for the education of African American teachers in the South.

Following a succession of leaders, in 1883, Dr. Ezekiel Ezra Smith, a graduate of Shaw Collegiate Institute (later Shaw University) in Raleigh, N.C., was appointed Principal and Chief Administrative Officer of the State Colored Normal School and began a fifty-year commitment of leadership and affiliation interrupted only by opportunities to honorably serve his country – once as Resident Minister and Consul General of the United States to Liberia and later as Regimental Adjutant of the Third North Carolina Volunteer Infantry during the Spanish–American War. During his distinguished tenure, Dr. Smith oversaw the school's move to a permanent site on Murchison Road and personally deeded additional land to bring its holdings to 92 acres, including a physical plant of several major buildings and cottages. It was also under his leadership that, in 1929, all high school work was suspended, and the title of Principal changed to president. On June 30, 1933, Dr. Smith retired and became the school's first President Emeritus.

Following Dr. Smith's retirement, Dr. J. Ward Seabrook assumed the presidency of what would, under his leadership, become Fayetteville State Teachers College in 1939, a state and regionally accredited four-year college granting the Bachelor of Science degree in education. Later, in 1959, under the presidency of Dr. Rudolph Jones, a revision of the school's charter authorized a curricular expansion to include programs leading to degrees outside the teaching field. It was also during Dr. Jones' presidency that the school became Fayetteville State College in 1963 and significant additions were made to the physical plant to accommodate a rapidly growing enrollment.

In 1969, Dr. Charles Lyons Jr. became president and in that year the college was formally renamed Fayetteville State University and designated a regional university by an act of the state legislature. Later, in 1972, Dr. Lyons became the first chancellor of FSU when it was made a constituent institution of The University of North Carolina by legislative act. It was also under the chancellorship of Dr. Lyons that the school became a Comprehensive Level I institution offering a variety of baccalaureate and master's degree programs. Additionally, several innovative initiatives sprang forth under the leadership of Dr. Lyons including the Fort Bragg-Pope Air Force Base Extension Center that, in collaboration with the newly established Weekend and Evening College, provided military personnel and other full-time employees the opportunity to further their education.

In 1988, Dr. Lloyd Hackley was named chancellor of FSU and began an active pursuit of initiatives to further expand both undergraduate and graduate program offerings, including the establishment of the university's first doctoral program in Educational Leadership in 1994. Continuing the spirit of innovation pioneered by his predecessors, Dr. Hackley strengthened FSU's commitment to community outreach with programs aimed at at-risk children in the public schools and oversaw the completion of the university's first major public capital campaign to increase privately funded scholarships available to students. Upon his departure from FSU, Dr. Hackley became the first African American President of the North Carolina Community College System.

Another first for the university came in 2003 when Dr. Thelma Jane "T.J." Bryan was elected by the University of North Carolina Board of Governors to become the first female chancellor of the school and the first African American woman to head a UNC institution. Under her leadership, the university greatly expanded undergraduate and graduate program offerings, secured important specialized accreditations, and became third in the UNC system in distance-learning enrollments. In 2008, Bryan was succeeded by Dr. James Anderson. Upon the departure of Dr. Anderson, Dr. Peggy Valentine was appointed Acting Chancellor in July 2019. In March 2021, Darrell T. Allison was selected as the 12th chief executive officer and Chancellor of Fayetteville State University.

== Academics ==
The primary mission of Fayetteville State University is to provide quality education to its students through a basic liberal arts foundation, specialized professional training, and specific graduate programs. The university offers bachelor's degrees in 43 areas, master's degrees in 23 areas, and one doctoral degree in educational leadership. The university is fully accredited by the Southern Association of Colleges and Schools.

== Library ==
The Charles W. Chesnutt Library supports the university in its academic and cultural endeavors. Services are available onsite and virtually. In addition, the Chesnutt Library assumes its special role as a major cultural resource for the community and the region at large.

The library is named for Charles W. Chesnutt, whose father, Andrew Jackson Chesnutt, was a founder of the university. Charles W. Chesnutt was an author, essayist, political activist, and lawyer.

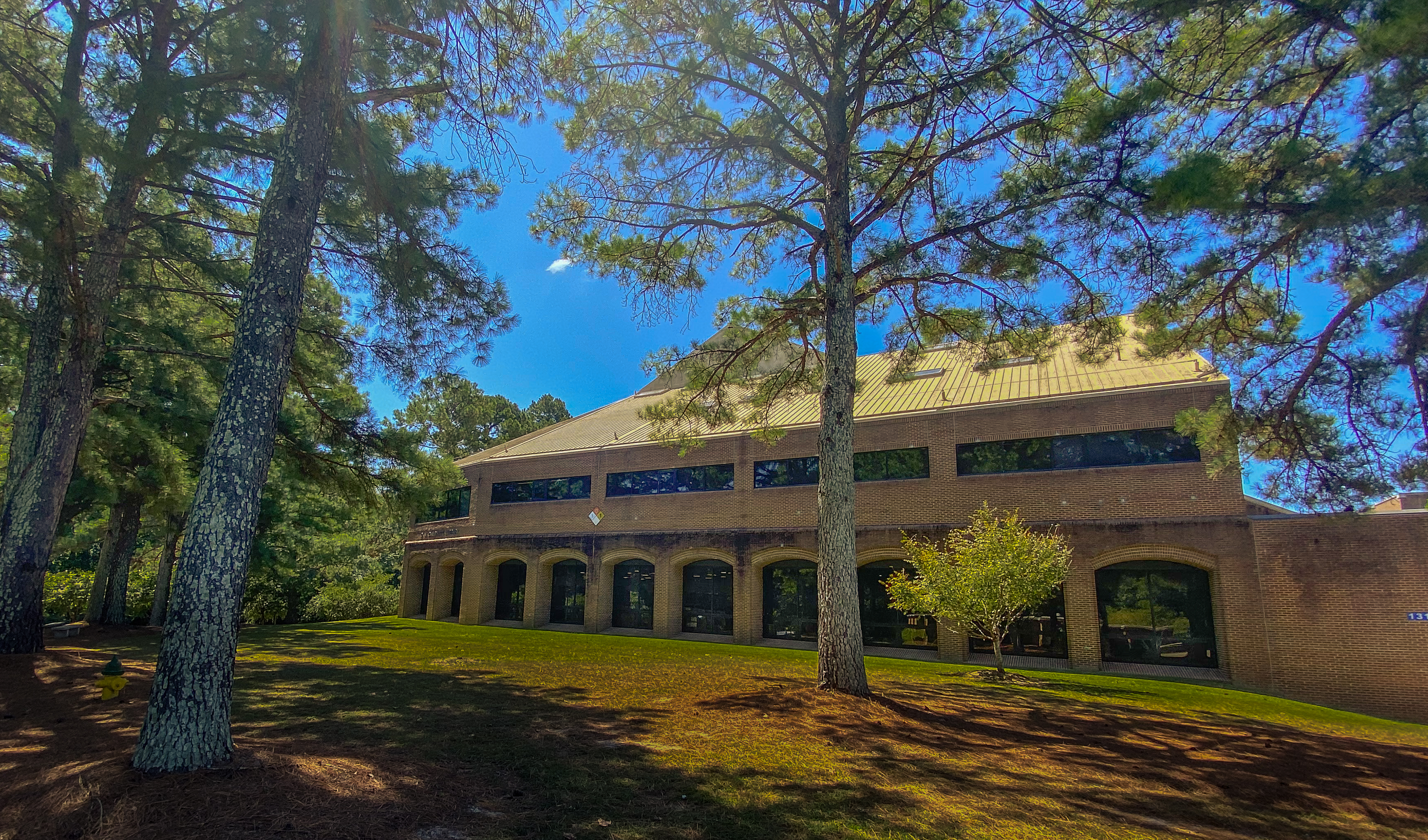
Charles Waddell Chesnutt Library Fayetteville State Univ. NC

The library currently holds over 192,000 volumes; 20,700 reels of microfilm; 631,000 pieces of microfiche; 2,769 periodicals; and 56 newspapers. It is a selective member of the U.S.Federal Depository Library Program. The Library hosts a Digital Commons for research and scholarly output.

The Archives and Special Collections on the library's fourth-floor house the university's archives, dissertations, and special collections. These include the Charles Waddell Chesnutt Collection with his correspondence, letters, and records of his sisters Anne C. Waddell and Sara Chesnutt, pictures of family and friends, newspaper and magazine clippings, and postcards. The papers of Ezekiel Ezra Smith, educator, diplomat, and former President of the Fayetteville State University are also in the archives.

In 2022, the library underwent a transition incorporating a One Stop for Advising and Student Success and an Adult Learning Center. This transition includes a transformation of spaces, collections, and services. Another focus is the development of new partnerships on campus. Also, in 2022 the American Library Association awarded the Chesnutt Library a grant of $20,000 to purchase laptops for students.

The Library is a member of the HBCU Library Alliance.

== Journal ==
The College of Education, Office of Research Initiatives, and Fayetteville State University sponsor and publish the Journal of Research Initiatives (JRI). JRI publishes its issues bi-annually. This is an independent, peer-reviewed, and methodologically diverse open-access journal edited by Dr. Linda Wilson-Jones.

== Student life ==
Undergraduate demographics as of Fall 2023
Race and ethnicity	Total
Black	63%
White	15%
Hispanic	10%
Two or more races	6%
Unknown	2%
American Indian/Alaska Native	1%
Asian	1%
International student	1%
Economic diversity
Low-income (Note: The percentage of students who received an income-based federal Pell grant intended for low-income students.)	57%
Affluent (Note: The percentage of students who are a part of the American middle class at the bare minimum.)	43%

=== Student organizations ===
Fayetteville State University students may participate in over 78 registered student organizations, including sororities and fraternities. An active intramural program offers students the opportunity to participate in flag football, basketball, track and field, soccer, and swimming. Many other organizations are continually added on a yearly basis at this school.

=== Athletics ===
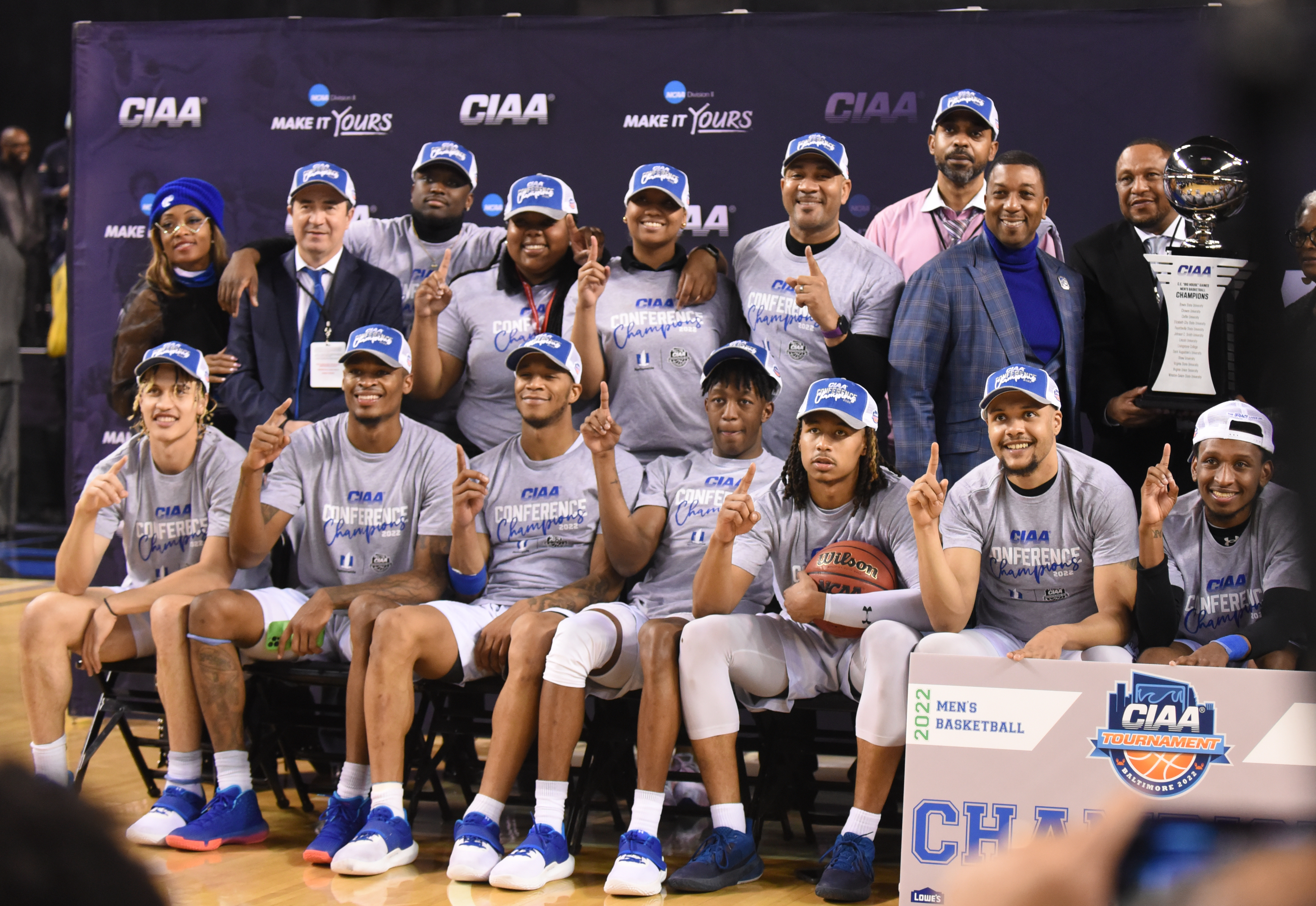
The Broncos basketball team celebrating after winning the 2022 CIAA men's basketball tournament.

Fayetteville State University currently participates in 10 NCAA sports, including men's football, basketball, cross-country/track, and golf. The women's programs include basketball, volleyball, softball, cross-country/track, tennis, and bowling. The university is a member of the Central Intercollegiate Athletic Association (CIAA).

=== Student media ===
Bronco-iRadio is the student online radio station. It is operated and managed by FSU students.

Fayetteville State University's students publish a bi-weekly newspaper, The Voice, which covers a variety of topics including student life, arts and entertainment, and sports, among others.

=== Performing and fine arts ===
Fayetteville State University has a performing and fine arts program that has featured artists including Dance Theatre of Harlem, Take 6, Mitch Capel, and many others.

== Notable alumni ==
- Chris Armstrong – former professional football player, Canadian Football League
- Darrell Armstrong – former professional basketball player, current assistant coach with the NBA's Dallas Mavericks
- Jim Bibby – former MLB player
- Affion Crockett – American actor, writer, dancer, rapper, comedian, music producer
- Brasheedah Elohim – American Israeli professional women's basketball player
- Algeania Freeman – American academic administrator
- Michele S. Jones – first woman in the United States Army Reserve to reach the position of command sergeant major of the U.S. Army Reserve
- Marvin W. Lucas – member of the North Carolina General Assembly
- Richard Medlin – former NFL player
- Sylvester Ritter – former NFL player and professional wrestler (known as "Junkyard Dog")
- Johnathan Michael Porter (Blueface) – Rapper and former quarterback for Fayetteville (did not graduate)
- Joshua Williams – NFL player
