= Ezekiel Ezra Smith =

American diplomat

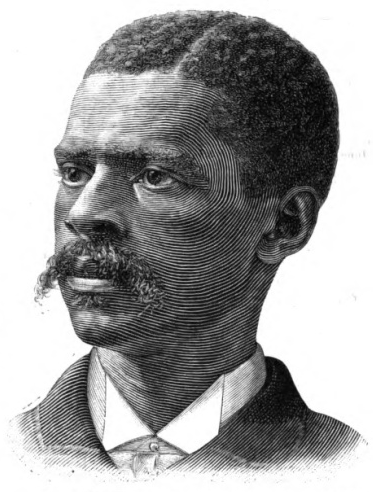
Frank Leslie's Illustrated Newspaper, June 9, 1888

Ezekiel Ezra Smith (May 23, 1852 – December 6, 1933) was an American educator and diplomat.

He was born in Duplin County, North Carolina, the son of free blacks Alexander and Caroline Smith. He received a bachelor's degree from Shaw University in 1878, later receiving a doctorate. He was selected as the Principal and Chief Administrative Officer of the State Colored Normal School, now Fayetteville State University in 1883 and continued in that position with short interruptions through 1933.

He served as the United States Ambassador to Liberia from 1888 through 1890 and regimental adjutant of the Third North Carolina Volunteer Infantry during the Spanish–American War.

E. E. Smith High School, located in Fayetteville, North Carolina, is named in his honor.
