= Stanley Roberts =

American basketball player (born 1970)

Personal information
- Born: February 7, 1970 (age 56) Hopkins, South Carolina, U.S.
- Listed height: 7 ft 0 in (2.13 m)
- Listed weight: 285 lb (129 kg)

Career information
- High school: Lower Richland (Hopkins, South Carolina)
- College: LSU (1989–1990)
- NBA draft: 1991: 1st round, 23rd overall pick
- Drafted by: Orlando Magic
- Playing career: 1990–2004
- Position: Center
- Number: 53

Career history
- 1990–1991: Real Madrid
- 1991–1992: Orlando Magic
- 1992–1997: Los Angeles Clippers
- 1997–1998: Minnesota Timberwolves
- 1998–1999: Aris
- 1999: Houston Rockets
- 1999: Philadelphia 76ers
- 1999–2000: Efes Pilsen
- 2000–2001: San Diego Wildfire
- 2004: Gallitos de Isabela

Career highlights
- NBA All-Rookie Second Team (1992); McDonald's All-American (1988); First-team Parade All-American (1988); Third-team Parade All-American (1987)

Career NBA statistics
- Points: 2,555 (8.5 ppg)
- Rebounds: 1,549 (5.2 rpg)
- Blocks: 385 (1.3 bpg)
- Stats at NBA.com
- Stats at Basketball Reference

Stanley Corvet Roberts (born February 7, 1970) is an American former professional basketball player who played center. He was said to have the potential to be the best center of all time. He played college basketball for Louisiana State University (LSU) before being drafted 23rd overall by the Orlando Magic in the 1991 NBA draft.

== Early life ==
Roberts attended Lower Richland High School in Hopkins, where he led his team to two straight state championships, was a Parade first-team All-American his senior year, and was considered a top-five player nationally, holding his own against Alonzo Mourning in the Dapper Dan and McDonald's All-Star Games.

== College career ==
Roberts played a single season of college basketball at Louisiana State University, during which he was a teammate of Shaquille O'Neal. Roberts was forced to sit out his freshman season at LSU due to academic ineligibility and would only play one season before leaving LSU to join the professional ranks.

After his professional career ended Roberts returned to LSU to complete his degree.

== Professional career ==
=== Real Madrid (1990–1991) ===
Roberts started playing professionally in Spain, with Real Madrid, sharing teams with another future National Basketball Association player, Venezuelan Carl Herrera. In his only season, he helped the Liga ACB club to the Korać Cup final, an overtime loss against Pallacanestro Cantù of Italy.

=== NBA (1991–1999) ===
Roberts was selected by the Orlando Magic in the 1st round (23rd overall) of the 1991 NBA draft, and went on to appear, in a career marred by injuries and other drawbacks, for the Magic, Los Angeles Clippers, Minnesota Timberwolves, Houston Rockets and Philadelphia 76ers in eight NBA seasons. Troubled by weight issues throughout his career, his best year in the league came during his first season with the Clippers, when he appeared in 77 games and averaged 11.3 points and 6.2 rebounds per game, with 141 blocked shots.

Roberts missed all but 14 games in the 1993–94 season, then all of the next due to an Achilles tendon injury, first in one leg, then the other. Amazingly, he still bounced back for three more respectable seasons.

=== ABA and international play (1999–2004) ===
After an unassuming six-game spell with the Rockets, as a member of the 76ers in late 1999, Roberts was banned by the NBA for drug violations. Before retiring, he played in Greece, Turkey, the ABA and Puerto Rico. In the 2003 off-season, the 33-year-old signed for the Toronto Raptors, being waived shortly after.

== See also ==
- List of people banned or suspended by the NBA
