= Lower Richland High School =

High school in South Carolina, United States

Coordinates: 33.9467°N 80.8719°W

Location
- 2615 Lower Richland Blvd; Hopkins, South Carolina 29061; United States

Information
- Type: Public high school
- Motto: “Collaborate, Cultivate, and Elevate”
- Teaching staff: 84.00 (FTE)
- Grades: 9–12
- Enrollment: 1,306 (2023–2024)
- Student to teacher ratio: 15.55
- Colors: Black, Vegas gold and white
- Nickname: Diamond Hornets
- Website: lr.richlandone.org

Lower Richland High School is a senior high school in unincorporated Richland County, South Carolina, north of, but not inside Hopkins, South Carolina. It is a part of Richland County School District One. It is an International Baccalaureate school. The school serves the town of Eastover and Hopkins.

== Notable alumni ==
=== Arts and entertainment ===
- Teyonah Parris, actress; did not graduate, but attended from 2001 to 2003

=== Athletics ===
- Ike Anderson (Class of 1975), Olympic Greco-Roman wrestler
- Jo Jo English (Class of 1988), NBA basketball player, top scorer in the 1999-2000 Israel Basketball League
- Harold Goodwin (Class of 1992), Offensive coordinator of the Arizona Cardinals
- Jonathan Goodwin (Class of 1997), former NFL center
- Brandon Jamison (Class of 2000), former NFL linebacker
- Ernie Jackson (Class of 1968), former NFL defensive back
- Lance Laury (Class of 2000), former NFL linebacker
- David Patten (Class of 1992), former NFL wide receiver
- Pokey Reese (Class of 1991), former MLB baseball player
- M. J. Rhett (Class of 2011), professional basketball player
- Stanley Roberts (Class of 1988), former NBA Center
- Richard Seymour (Class of 1997), former NFL defensive end

=== Media ===
- Nia-Malika Henderson (Class of 1992), political reporter for CNN
