= E. E. Smith High School =

American public school in North Carolina

Location
- 1800 Seabrook Rd. Fayetteville, North Carolina 28301; United States; 35°05′04″N 78°53′45″W

Information
- Type: Public
- Motto: Born of Need * Destined to Serve * Striving to Excel
- Founded: 1927 (99 years ago)
- School district: Cumberland County Schools
- Superintendent: Marvin Connelly
- CEEB code: 341305
- Principal: Larry Parker Jr.
- Staff: 60.55 (FTE)
- Grades: 9–12
- Enrollment: 1,000 (2023–2024)
- Student to teacher ratio: 16.52
- Language: English
- Colors: Navy blue and old gold
- Mascot: Golden Bulls
- Website: eeshs.ccs.k12.nc.us

E. E. Smith High School (also Ezekiel Ezra Smith High School, E.E.S., Smith High, Smith) is a high school in Fayetteville, North Carolina. A part of Cumberland County Schools, it is named for Ezekiel Ezra Smith (1852–1933) and is home of the Golden Bulls.

High school aged dependents of personnel living on the military reservation of Fort Bragg, in Cumberland County, are zoned to E. E. Smith.

== History ==
Ezekiel Ezra Smith High School has been home of the Mighty Golden Bulls since 1927.

The school has been in four locations: Orange Street, Campbell Avenue, Washington Drive, and Seabrook Rd (Present Location). From 1927 to 1929, the Orange Street School served as the high school. The school was moved to the building on Campbell Avenue in September 1929. At that time, the school was known as the Southside High School. This building was used until 1932. In September 1932, the school was rehoused in the building on Orange Street, remaining there until January 1940. A new modern edifice was built on Washington Drive in 1941. This building served students until June 1954.

In 1954, the current physical facility was erected and made ready for occupancy on September 6, 1954. This building with its beautiful and functional architecture occupies a site of twenty-eight acres. In 1932, the Fayetteville Grade School Trustees held a special meeting and voted unanimously to name the school in honor of the distinguished educator, clergyman and U.S. Ambassador, Ezekiel Ezra Smith (1852–1933), a man who left a legacy of unusually fine and constructive work. Hereafter, the school was officially designated E. E. Smith High School, trusting that the standards of the school would always be kept worthy of the name which was bestowed upon it.

To date the school has had eleven principals: Benjamin Lay, W.C. Donnell, A. J. Blackburn, E. E. Miller, W. T. Brown, John R. Griffin Jr., Lonnie McAllister, Rene' Corders, Clinton Robinson, Melody Chalmers, Donell Underdue and the current principal Larry Parker.

Today, the school plant consists of approximately 50 classrooms, housing foreign languages, science and computer labs, offices, a guidance suite, library, auditorium, music rooms, 2 gymnasiums, cafeteria, music building and a physical education building.

The D.T. Carter Athletic Field which seats approximately 5,000 persons, has a quarter mile track, and facilities for other field events. There are also six tennis courts.

== Notable alumni ==
- Charlie Baggett (born 1953) — former NFL coach and college football coach
- Robert Brickey (born 1967) — basketball coach
- Harold Floyd "Tina" Brooks (1932-1974) — hard bop, blues, funk tenor saxophonist and composer
- Aaron Curry (born 1986) — former NFL linebacker
- Mark Allen Davis (born 1966) — jurist and former NC Supreme Court Judge
- Russell Davis (born 1975) — former NFL defensive tackle, Super Bowl XLII champion with the New York Giants
- J. Harrison Ghee (born 1989) — Tony Award-winning Broadway actor known for Kinky Boots and Some Like It Hot
- Bishop Harris (1941-2024) — former college football coach and NFL coach
- Joe Harris (born 1952) — former NFL linebacker, member of Georgia Tech Athletic Hall of Fame
- Brian Tyree Henry (born 1982) — Academy Award nominee for Best Supporting Actor in Causeway, best known for his role as Paper Boi in the FX series Atlanta
- Patricia D. Horoho (born 1960) — retired U.S Army Lieutenant General and 43rd U.S. Army Surgeon General and Commanding General of the U.S. Army Medical Command. The first female and first Nurse Corps Officer to hold those appointments.
- Jason Hunter (before 1983) — former NFL defensive end
- Lil' Mo (Cynthia Karen Loving; born 1978) — R&B singer, radio personality, songwriter, and record producer
- Connell Maynor (born 1969) — college football head coach
- Mary E. McAllister (1937-2020) — Democratic member of the North Carolina General Assembly representing the 43rd House district
- Anquell McCollum (born 1973) — former professional basketball player and college coach
- Victoria "Porkchop" Parker (born 1970) — drag performer
- Jimmy Raye II (born 1946) — former NFL player and current coach
- Junior Smith (born 1973) — CFL player
- Larry Tearry (born 1956) — former NFL center
- Cressie Thigpen (born 1946) — lawyer and jurist who served on the North Carolina Court of Appeals
- Tank Tyler (born 1985) — former NFL defensive tackle
- Dimitrius Underwood (born 1977) — former NFL defensive end
- Doug Wilkerson (1947-2021) — former NFL offensive lineman and 3x Pro Bowl selection with the San Diego Chargers
