= Northeastern High School (North Carolina) =

American public school in North Carolina

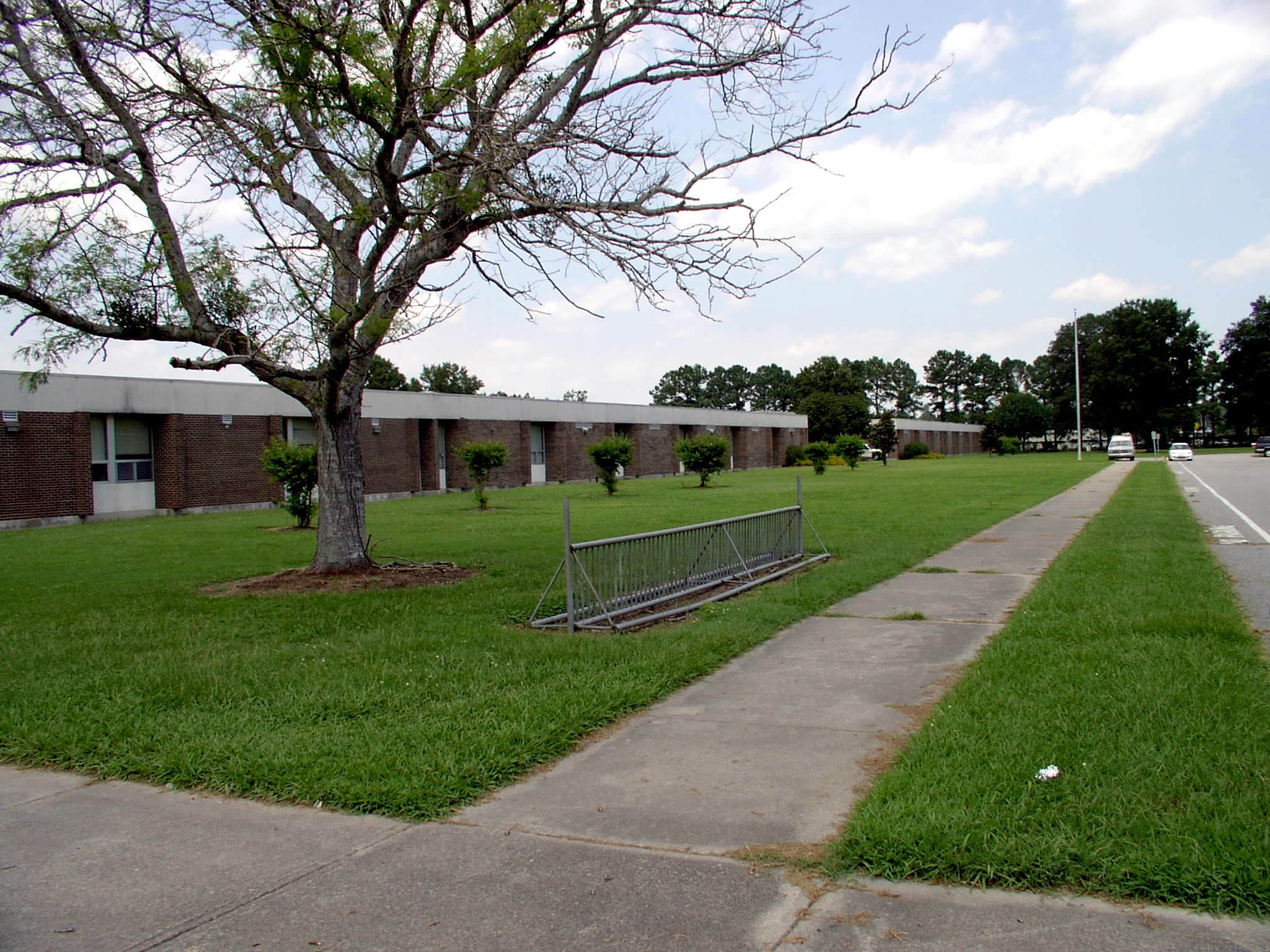

Location
- 963 Oak Stump Road; Elizabeth City, North Carolina 27909; United States; 36°17′13″N 76°15′17″W

Information
- Type: Public
- Motto: "A community of caring"
- Established: 1969 (57 years ago)
- CEEB code: 341120
- Principal: Angela Cobb
- Teaching staff: 42.08 (FTE)
- Enrollment: 666 (2023–2024)
- Student to teacher ratio: 15.83
- Colors: Green and gold
- Mascot: Eagle
- Website: nhs.ecpps.k12.nc.us

Northeastern High School (often abbreviated NHS) is a public school located in Elizabeth City, North Carolina, United States. The school was established in 1969, consolidating Elizabeth City High School, P.W. Moore High School, and Central High School. Northeastern's mascot is the Eagle. Its school colors are green and gold. It is one of two high schools in Pasquotank County; the other being Pasquotank County High School.

== Student demographics ==
As of 2005, the student body was composed of approximately 435 males and 420 females with a racial dynamic of 49% African American, 47.8% Caucasian, 0.7% Asian, 1.4% Hispanic, and 1.1% multi-racial. Of the school's 855 students, 12.0% were identified academically gifted while 11.9% were identified exceptional.

== Enrollment ==
Northeastern High School served an average of 855 students during the 2003–04 school year. Additionally, 114 Pasquotank County High School students were served at NHS for at least one class. There were 63 transfer students, 27 students who enrolled at COA and 18 students who chose not to enroll in another educational setting. Five students were early graduates. This reflects a 7.2% decrease in transfers from 14.6% in 2002–2003 to 7.4% in 2003–2004. The state-defined dropout rate increased from 4.4% in 2002–2003 to 5.3% in 2003–2004. The percent of early graduates was almost cut in half for the third year in a row, going from 1.9% in 2002–2003 to 0.52% in 2003–2004.

== Promotion rates ==
89.3% of the students at Northeastern High School were promoted at the conclusion of the spring 2004 semester. This is very similar to the 90.3% promotion rate previous year. The highest number of retentions still remains at the ninth grade level with 15.3% (38 out of 248 students) not meeting promotion standards. This 15.3% is slightly lower than the 15.9% retention rate at the ninth grade level in 2003. The senior class of 2004 had 171 graduates receiving diplomas and 3 receiving certificates, reflecting a graduation rate of 98.3%.

Post-graduation plans for seniors reveal the following distribution: 51% four-year college, 23% two-year college, and 26% other. There were 56 North Carolina scholars and 37 honor graduates in the 2004 graduating class. Approximately $800,000 was awarded in scholarships to the class of 2004.

== Athletics ==
- Baseball
- Basketball (Men's and Women's)
- Cheerleading
- Cross Country (Men's and Women's)
- Football
- Swimming (Men's and Women's)
- Softball
- Tennis (Men's and Women's)
- Track and Field (Men's and Women's)
- Volleyball
- Soccer (Men's and Women's)
- Wrestling

== Notable alumni ==
- Anthony Smith, former NFL defensive end
- Kenny Williams, professional basketball player
