= 1900 Prohibition National Convention =

American political convention

- 1900 presidential election
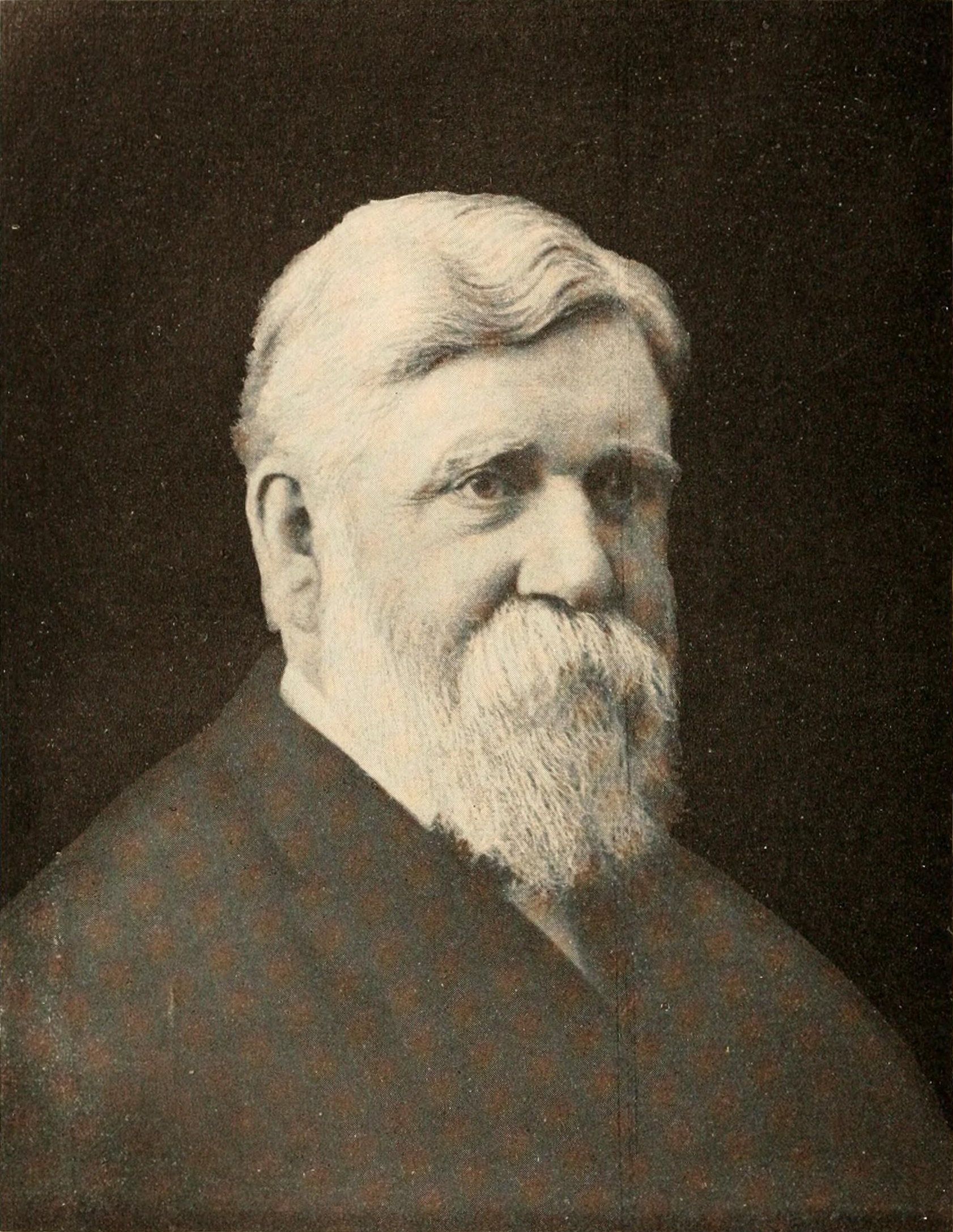
- Nominees (Woolley and Metcalf)

Convention
- Date(s): June 27–28, 1900
- City: Chicago, Illinois
- Venue: First Regiment Armory

Candidates
- Presidential nominee: John G. Woolley of Illinois
- Vice-presidential nominee: Henry B. Metcalf of Rhode Island

The 1900 Prohibition National Convention was held June 27–28 at First Regiment Armory in Chicago, Illinois. It nominated John G. Woolley for president and Henry B. Metcalf for vice president.

== Logistics ==
The convention was held July 27 and 28 in Chicago, Illinois. The First Regiment Armory, where the convention was held, was a sizable venue.

== Election of national party officers ==
On its first day, the convention elected Samuel Dickie of Michigan to a term as party chairman and R. S. Cheves to a term as party secretary.

== Nomination of presidential ticket ==
Hale Johnson, who was the party's vice-presidential nominee in 1896, withdrew his name as a presidential contender immediately before the balloting was to begin. John G. Woolley was nominated for president on the first ballot, with Henry B. Metcalf of Rhode Island nominated to be his running mate in short order.

Balloting
Presidential ballot	1st ballot	Vice Presidential ballot	1st ballot
John G. Woolley	380	Henry B. Metcalf	349
Silas C. Swallow	320	Thomas Carskadon	132
		E. L. Eaton	113

After each nomination, motions were adopted to recognize them each as unanimous. Short speeches were delivered by the nominees in a mass meeting at the First Regiment Armory on the evening of June 28.
