= 1900 United States presidential election in Indiana =

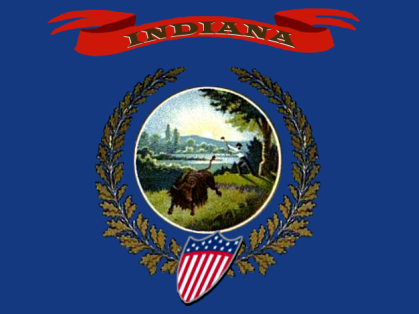
- November 6, 1900
- Turnout: 92.1% ▼3.0 pp
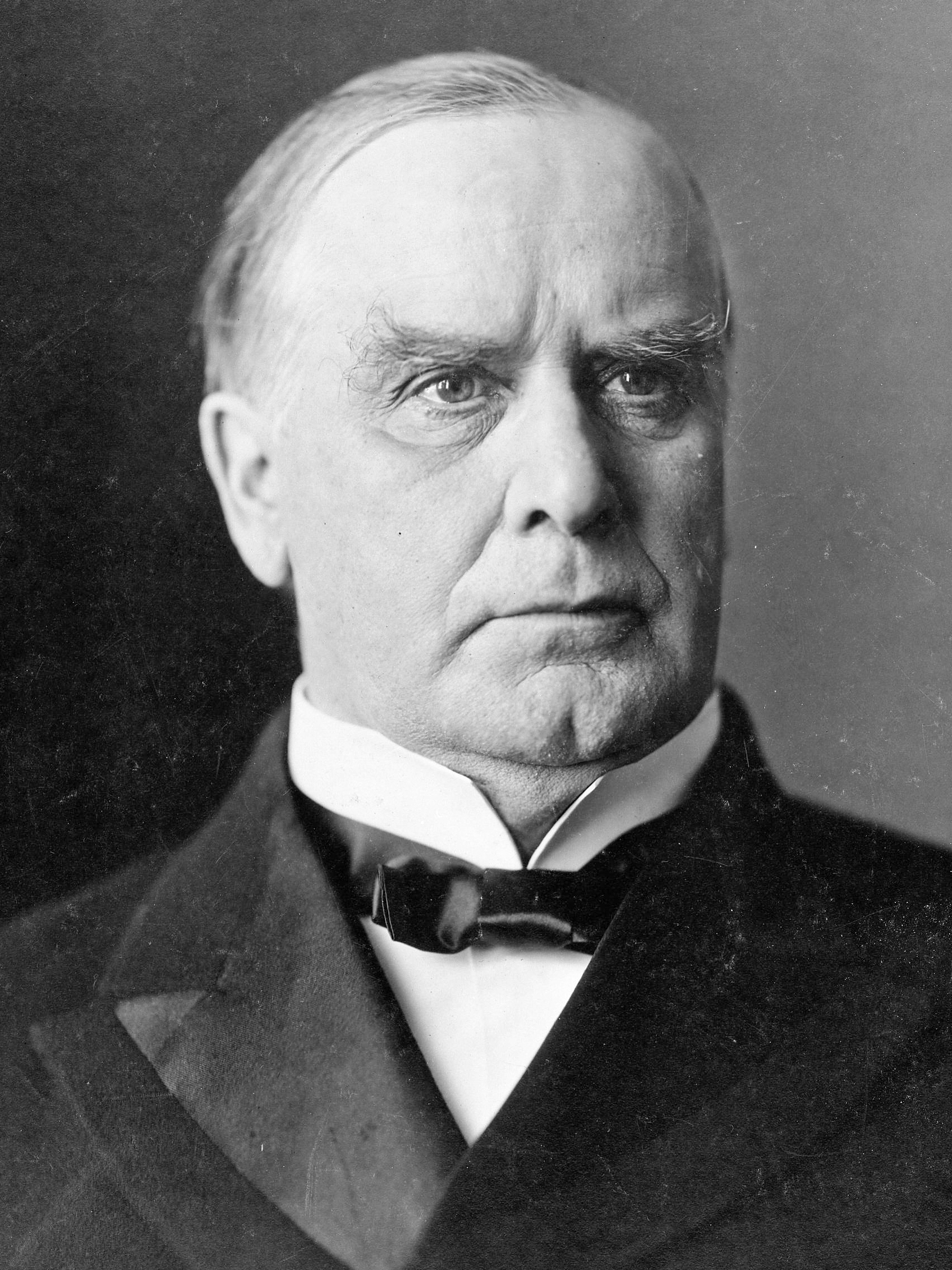

Nominee	William McKinley	William Jennings Bryan
Party	Republican	Democratic
Home state	Ohio	Nebraska
Running mate	Theodore Roosevelt	Adlai Stevenson I
Electoral vote	15	0
Popular vote	336,063	309,584
Percentage	50.60%	46.62%
County results
McKinley
40–50%
50–60%
60–70%
Bryan
40–50%
50–60%
60–70%
President before election
William McKinley
Republican
Elected President
William McKinley
Republican

A presidential election was held in Indiana on November 6, 1900, as part of the 1900 United States presidential election. The Republican ticket of the incumbent president William McKinley and the governor of New York Theodore Roosevelt defeated the Democratic ticket of the former U.S. representative from Nebraska's 1st congressional district William Jennings Bryan and the former vice president Adlai Stevenson I. McKinley defeated Bryan in the national election with 292 electoral votes.

== General election ==
=== Results ===
Indiana chose 15 electors in a statewide general election. State law required voters to elect each member of the Electoral College individually; under this system, electors nominated by the same party often received differing numbers of votes as a consequence of voter rolloff, split-ticket voting, or electoral fusion. The following table quotes the official returns published by the secretary of state of Indiana, which list the votes for the first elector on each ticket.

1900 United States presidential election in Indiana
Party	Candidate	Votes	%	±%
Republican	William McKinley Theodore Roosevelt	336,063	50.60	▼0.21
Democratic	William Jennings Bryan Adlai Stevenson I	309,584	46.62	▼1.34
Prohibition	John G. Woolley Henry B. Metcalf	13,718	2.07	▲0.59
Social Democratic	Eugene V. Debs Job Harriman	2,374	0.36	▲0.36
Populist	Wharton Barker Ignatius L. Donnelly	1,438	0.22	▲0.22
Socialist Labor	Joseph F. Malloney Valentine Remmel	663	0.10	▲0.05
Union Reform	Seth H. Ellis Samuel T. Nicholson	254	0.04	▲0.04
Total votes		637,124	100.00	

=== Results by county ===
County	William McKinley Republican		William Jennings Bryan Democratic		John G. Woolley Prohibition		Others		Margin		Total
County	#	%	#	%	#	%	#	%	#	%	Total
Adams	1,688	32.90%	3,337	65.05%	90	1.75%	15	0.29%	-1,649	-32.14%	5,130
Allen	8,250	42.53%	10,764	55.50%	109	0.56%	273	1.41%	-2,514	-12.96%	19,396
Bartholomew	3,275	48.96%	3,300	49.33%	83	1.24%	31	0.46%	-25	-0.37%	6,689
Benton	2,032	54.98%	1,563	42.29%	90	2.44%	11	0.30%	469	12.69%	3,696
Blackford	2,121	47.18%	2,191	48.73%	148	3.29%	36	0.80%	-70	-1.56%	4,496
Boone	3,360	46.10%	3,718	51.02%	115	1.58%	95	1.30%	-358	-4.91%	7,288
Brown	707	32.01%	1,450	65.64%	34	1.54%	18	0.81%	-743	-33.64%	2,209
Carroll	2,585	47.42%	2,690	49.35%	155	2.84%	21	0.39%	-105	-1.93%	5,451
Cass	4,308	46.34%	4,672	50.26%	239	2.57%	77	0.83%	-364	-3.92%	9,296
Clark	3,855	47.74%	4,134	51.20%	51	0.63%	35	0.43%	-279	-3.46%	8,075
Clay	3,873	45.87%	4,114	48.72%	170	2.01%	287	3.40%	-241	-2.85%	8,444
Clinton	3,677	48.57%	3,603	47.59%	216	2.85%	75	0.99%	74	0.98%	7,571
Crawford	1,529	46.07%	1,731	52.15%	48	1.45%	11	0.33%	-202	-6.09%	3,319
Daviess	3,298	46.99%	3,424	48.79%	132	1.88%	164	2.34%	-126	-1.80%	7,018
De Kalb	3,218	45.54%	3,488	49.36%	259	3.67%	101	1.43%	-270	-3.82%	7,066
Dearborn	2,533	42.01%	3,371	55.91%	84	1.39%	41	0.68%	-838	-13.90%	6,029
Decatur	2,900	51.52%	2,598	46.15%	105	1.87%	26	0.46%	302	5.37%	5,629
Delaware	8,301	61.65%	4,647	34.51%	321	2.38%	195	1.45%	3,654	27.14%	13,464
Dubois	1,362	29.72%	3,192	69.65%	20	0.44%	9	0.20%	-1,830	-39.93%	4,583
Elkhart	6,270	52.64%	4,950	41.56%	544	4.57%	147	1.23%	1,320	11.08%	11,911
Fayette	2,320	58.03%	1,600	40.02%	65	1.63%	13	0.33%	720	18.01%	3,998
Floyd	3,597	48.08%	3,781	50.54%	57	0.76%	46	0.61%	-184	-2.46%	7,481
Fountain	3,015	49.62%	2,896	47.66%	100	1.65%	65	1.07%	119	1.96%	6,076
Franklin	1,738	38.11%	2,781	60.97%	37	0.81%	5	0.11%	-1,043	-22.87%	4,561
Fulton	2,313	48.46%	2,358	49.40%	93	1.95%	9	0.19%	-45	-0.94%	4,773
Gibson	3,648	49.03%	3,509	47.16%	244	3.28%	40	0.54%	139	1.87%	7,441
Grant	8,832	57.83%	5,312	34.78%	762	4.99%	367	2.40%	3,520	23.05%	15,273
Greene	3,502	48.36%	3,491	48.20%	81	1.12%	168	2.32%	11	0.15%	7,242
Hamilton	4,788	58.59%	2,931	35.87%	420	5.14%	33	0.40%	1,857	22.72%	8,172
Hancock	2,295	42.95%	2,930	54.84%	98	1.83%	20	0.37%	-635	-11.88%	5,343
Harrison	2,482	45.85%	2,824	52.17%	83	1.53%	24	0.44%	-342	-6.32%	5,413
Hendricks	3,426	57.48%	2,359	39.58%	154	2.58%	21	0.35%	1,067	17.90%	5,960
Henry	4,047	56.61%	2,754	38.52%	316	4.42%	32	0.45%	1,293	18.09%	7,149
Howard	4,308	56.43%	2,823	36.98%	391	5.12%	112	1.47%	1,485	19.45%	7,634
Huntington	4,122	50.82%	3,691	45.51%	248	3.06%	50	0.62%	431	5.31%	8,111
Jackson	2,795	41.46%	3,849	57.09%	79	1.17%	19	0.28%	-1,054	-15.63%	6,742
Jasper	2,083	55.15%	1,580	41.83%	97	2.57%	17	0.45%	503	13.32%	3,777
Jay	3,518	48.82%	3,422	47.49%	234	3.25%	32	0.44%	96	1.33%	7,206
Jefferson	3,371	55.05%	2,636	43.05%	76	1.24%	40	0.65%	735	12.00%	6,123
Jennings	2,155	51.77%	1,925	46.24%	66	1.59%	17	0.41%	230	5.52%	4,163
Johnson	2,367	41.93%	3,088	54.70%	157	2.78%	33	0.58%	-721	-12.77%	5,645
Knox	3,554	43.06%	4,443	53.83%	166	2.01%	90	1.09%	-889	-10.77%	8,253
Kosciusko	4,422	56.07%	3,265	41.40%	163	2.07%	36	0.46%	1,157	14.67%	7,886
La Porte	4,809	49.41%	4,783	49.15%	66	0.68%	74	0.76%	26	0.27%	9,732
Lagrange	2,329	59.29%	1,431	36.43%	157	4.00%	11	0.28%	898	22.86%	3,928
Lake	5,337	57.09%	3,733	39.93%	97	1.04%	182	1.95%	1,604	17.16%	9,349
Lawrence	3,535	57.04%	2,558	41.28%	76	1.23%	28	0.45%	977	15.77%	6,197
Madison	9,891	52.60%	8,298	44.13%	444	2.36%	171	0.91%	1,593	8.47%	18,804
Marion	29,272	53.97%	23,660	43.62%	727	1.34%	577	1.06%	5,612	10.35%	54,236
Marshall	2,947	44.75%	3,449	52.37%	127	1.93%	63	0.96%	-502	-7.62%	6,586
Martin	1,712	50.19%	1,660	48.67%	21	0.62%	18	0.53%	52	1.52%	3,411
Miami	3,812	48.13%	3,849	48.59%	194	2.45%	66	0.83%	-37	-0.47%	7,921
Monroe	2,788	52.77%	2,397	45.37%	78	1.48%	20	0.38%	391	7.40%	5,283
Montgomery	4,507	51.08%	4,102	46.49%	173	1.96%	41	0.46%	405	4.59%	8,823
Morgan	2,904	51.35%	2,632	46.54%	104	1.84%	15	0.27%	272	4.81%	5,655
Newton	1,715	57.30%	1,165	38.92%	100	3.34%	13	0.43%	550	18.38%	2,993
Noble	3,400	51.42%	3,077	46.54%	117	1.77%	18	0.27%	323	4.89%	6,612
Ohio	730	53.36%	632	46.20%	6	0.44%	0	0.00%	98	7.16%	1,368
Orange	2,247	54.18%	1,851	44.63%	45	1.09%	4	0.10%	396	9.55%	4,147
Owen	1,706	44.29%	2,057	53.40%	55	1.43%	34	0.88%	-351	-9.11%	3,852
Parke	3,138	51.58%	2,630	43.23%	213	3.50%	103	1.69%	508	8.35%	6,084
Perry	2,078	47.17%	2,278	51.71%	41	0.93%	8	0.18%	-200	-4.54%	4,405
Pike	2,420	48.65%	2,460	49.46%	70	1.41%	24	0.48%	-40	-0.80%	4,974
Porter	2,797	59.28%	1,848	39.17%	47	1.00%	26	0.55%	949	20.11%	4,718
Posey	2,553	43.51%	3,177	54.15%	99	1.69%	38	0.65%	-624	-10.64%	5,867
Pulaski	1,501	42.74%	1,909	54.36%	86	2.45%	16	0.46%	-408	-11.62%	3,512
Putnam	2,632	43.40%	3,251	53.61%	133	2.19%	48	0.79%	-619	-10.21%	6,064
Randolph	5,050	65.51%	2,393	31.04%	241	3.13%	25	0.32%	2,657	34.47%	7,709
Ripley	2,737	49.24%	2,732	49.15%	61	1.10%	29	0.52%	5	0.09%	5,559
Rush	2,913	52.12%	2,503	44.78%	158	2.83%	15	0.27%	410	7.34%	5,589
Scott	874	40.96%	1,221	57.22%	27	1.27%	12	0.56%	-347	-16.26%	2,134
Shelby	3,291	44.46%	3,846	51.96%	197	2.66%	68	0.92%	-555	-7.50%	7,402
Spencer	2,979	50.51%	2,816	47.74%	91	1.54%	12	0.20%	163	2.76%	5,898
St. Joseph	8,127	52.86%	6,948	45.19%	172	1.12%	127	0.83%	1,179	7.67%	15,374
Starke	1,340	49.59%	1,315	48.67%	38	1.41%	9	0.33%	25	0.93%	2,702
Steuben	2,715	61.82%	1,522	34.65%	138	3.14%	17	0.39%	1,193	27.16%	4,392
Sullivan	2,326	35.15%	4,008	60.57%	201	3.04%	82	1.24%	-1,682	-25.42%	6,617
Switzerland	1,631	48.44%	1,713	50.88%	18	0.53%	5	0.15%	-82	-2.44%	3,367
Tippecanoe	6,317	56.11%	4,673	41.51%	224	1.99%	44	0.39%	1,644	14.60%	11,258
Tipton	2,410	47.69%	2,436	48.20%	154	3.05%	54	1.07%	-26	-0.51%	5,054
Union	1,060	52.58%	897	44.49%	52	2.58%	7	0.35%	163	8.09%	2,016
Vanderburgh	8,228	51.47%	7,178	44.90%	110	0.69%	469	2.93%	1,050	6.57%	15,985
Vermillion	2,322	53.81%	1,799	41.69%	107	2.48%	87	2.02%	523	12.12%	4,315
Vigo	7,992	49.39%	7,472	46.18%	168	1.04%	548	3.39%	520	3.21%	16,180
Wabash	4,433	58.25%	2,882	37.87%	250	3.29%	45	0.59%	1,551	20.38%	7,610
Warren	2,167	64.28%	1,117	33.14%	67	1.99%	20	0.59%	1,050	31.15%	3,371
Warrick	2,540	46.34%	2,828	51.60%	92	1.68%	21	0.38%	-288	-5.25%	5,481
Washington	2,152	43.55%	2,723	55.11%	44	0.89%	22	0.45%	-571	-11.56%	4,941
Wayne	6,736	61.08%	4,020	36.45%	219	1.99%	54	0.49%	2,716	24.63%	11,029
Wells	2,290	37.43%	3,599	58.83%	186	3.04%	43	0.70%	-1,309	-21.40%	6,118
White	2,562	49.17%	2,510	48.17%	114	2.19%	25	0.48%	52	1.00%	5,211
Whitley	2,271	47.65%	2,361	49.54%	113	2.37%	21	0.44%	-90	-1.89%	4,766
Totals	336,063	50.79%	309,584	46.78%	13,718	2.07%	2,359	0.36%	26,479	4.00%	661,724

=== Maps ===
Result for the leading Republican elector by county

Result for the leading Democratic elector by county

Result for the leading Prohibition elector by county

Result for the leading Social Democratic elector by county

Result for the leading Populist elector by county

Result for the leading Socialist Labor elector by county

Result for the leading Union Reform elector by county

== See also ==
- United States presidential elections in Indiana

== Bibliography ==
- Hunt, Union B. (1900). Biennial Report of Union B. Hunt, Secretary of State of the State of Indiana [...]. Indianapolis.
- Madison, James H. (1986). The Indiana Way: A State History. Bloomington: Indiana University Press.
- Petersen, Svend (1963). A Statistical History of the American Presidential Elections. New York: Frederick Ungar Publishing Company. LCCN 62-21786.
