= 1900 United States presidential election in Ohio =

- November 6, 1900
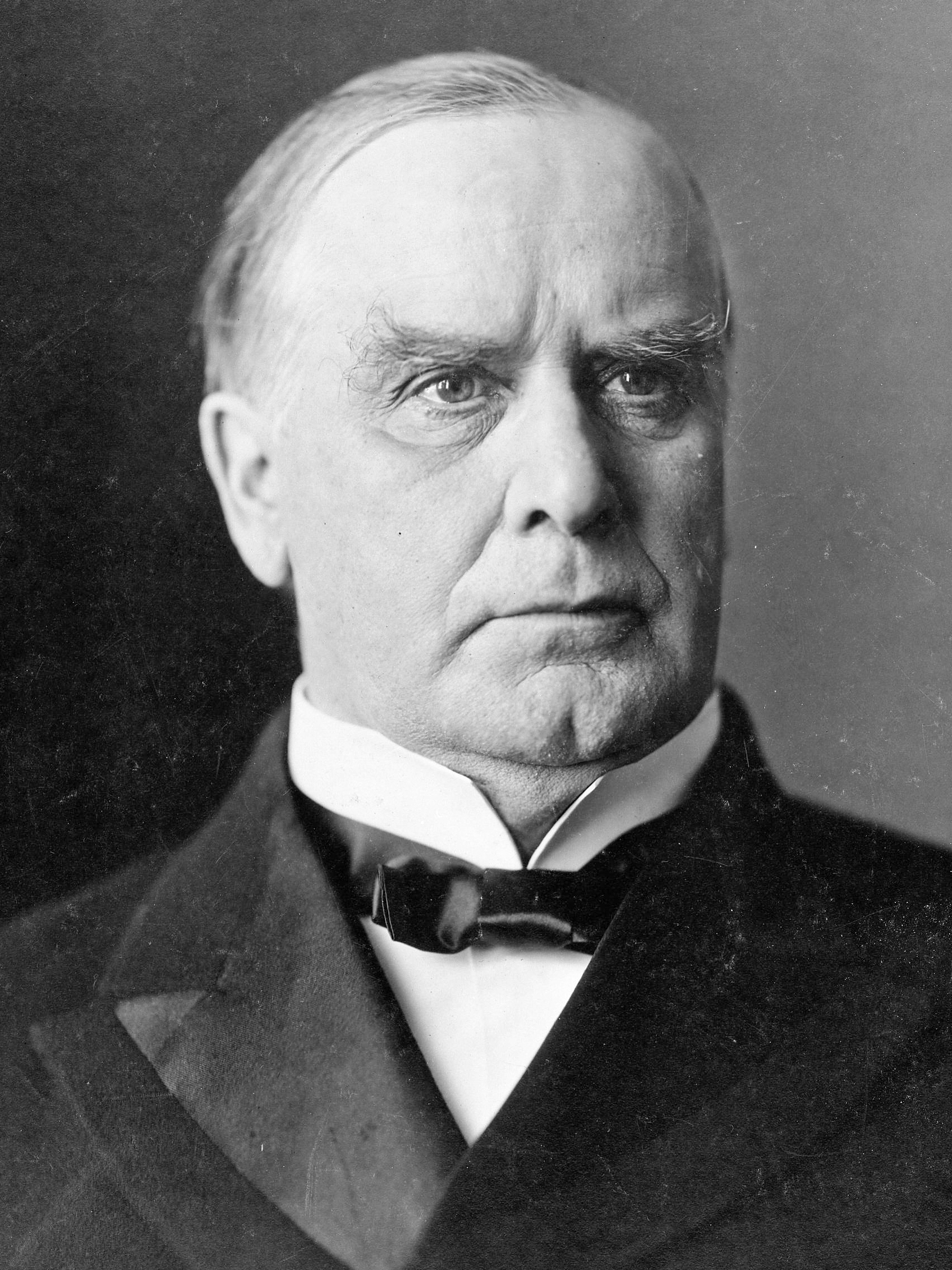

Nominee	William McKinley	William Jennings Bryan
Party	Republican	Democratic
Home state	Ohio	Nebraska
Running mate	Theodore Roosevelt	Adlai Stevenson I
Electoral vote	23	0
Popular vote	543,918	474,882
Percentage	52.30%	45.66%
County results
McKinley
40–50%
50–60%
60–70%
70–80%
Bryan
50–60%
60–70%
70–80%
President before election
William McKinley
Republican
Elected President
William McKinley
Republican

The 1900 United States presidential election in Ohio was held on November 6, 1900, as part of the 1900 United States presidential election. State voters chose 23 electors to the Electoral College, who voted for president and vice president.

Ohio was won by the Republican Party candidate, incumbent president and Ohio native son William McKinley with 52.30% of the popular vote. The Democratic Party candidate, William Jennings Bryan, garnered 45.66% of the popular vote. McKinley won his home state by a margin of 6.64%.

Bryan had previous lost Ohio to McKinley four years earlier and would later lose the state again in 1908 to William Howard Taft.

== Results ==
1900 United States presidential election in Ohio
Party	Candidate	Votes	Percentage	Electoral votes
Republican	William McKinley (incumbent)	543,918	52.30%	23
Democratic	William Jennings Bryan	474,882	45.66%	0
Prohibition	John G. Woolley	10,203	0.98%	0
Social Democratic	Eugene V. Debs	4,847	0.47%	0
Union Reform	Seth H. Ellis	4,284	0.41%	0
Socialist Labor	Joseph F. Malloney	1,688	0.16%	0
Populist	Wharton Barker	251	0.02%	0
Totals		1,040,073	100.0%	23

=== Results by county ===
County	William McKinley Republican		William Jennings Bryan Democratic		Various candidates Other parties		Margin		Total votes cast
County	#	%	#	%	#	%	#	%	Total votes cast
Adams	3,535	51.81%	3,169	46.45%	119	1.74%	366	5.36%	6,823
Allen	5,281	43.94%	6,540	54.42%	197	1.64%	-1,259	-10.48%	12,018
Ashland	2,641	43.15%	3,399	55.53%	81	1.32%	-758	-12.38%	6,121
Ashtabula	9,272	70.70%	3,438	26.21%	405	3.09%	5,834	44.48%	13,115
Athens	6,126	68.90%	2,529	28.44%	236	2.65%	3,597	40.46%	8,891
Auglaize	2,895	37.18%	4,812	61.80%	79	1.01%	-1,917	-24.62%	7,786
Belmont	8,217	55.33%	6,251	42.09%	384	2.59%	1,966	13.24%	14,852
Brown	2,991	39.95%	4,397	58.73%	99	1.32%	-1,406	-18.78%	7,487
Butler	6,025	39.52%	8,880	58.25%	339	2.22%	-2,855	-18.73%	15,244
Carroll	2,668	59.58%	1,720	38.41%	90	2.01%	948	21.17%	4,478
Champaign	4,306	56.32%	3,192	41.75%	148	1.94%	1,114	14.57%	7,646
Clark	8,806	57.33%	6,243	40.64%	312	2.03%	2,563	16.69%	15,361
Clermont	3,990	47.43%	4,244	50.45%	178	2.12%	-254	-3.02%	8,412
Clinton	4,149	62.09%	2,394	35.83%	139	2.08%	1,755	26.26%	6,682
Columbiana	10,255	60.53%	5,997	35.40%	690	4.07%	4,258	25.13%	16,942
Coshocton	3,592	46.67%	3,940	51.20%	164	2.13%	-348	-4.52%	7,696
Crawford	3,150	33.98%	5,968	64.39%	151	1.63%	-2,818	-30.40%	9,269
Cuyahoga	45,299	50.17%	42,440	47.01%	2,549	2.82%	2,859	3.17%	90,288
Darke	4,834	43.79%	6,003	54.38%	201	1.82%	-1,169	-10.59%	11,038
Defiance	2,684	40.80%	3,766	57.25%	128	1.95%	-1,082	-16.45%	6,578
Delaware	3,765	51.40%	3,337	45.56%	223	3.04%	428	5.84%	7,325
Erie	5,353	51.95%	4,837	46.94%	115	1.12%	516	5.01%	10,305
Fairfield	3,738	40.14%	5,431	58.32%	144	1.55%	-1,693	-18.18%	9,313
Fayette	3,380	57.25%	2,438	41.29%	86	1.46%	942	15.96%	5,904
Franklin	22,237	52.16%	19,809	46.46%	590	1.38%	2,428	5.69%	42,636
Fulton	3,457	59.49%	2,262	38.93%	92	1.58%	1,195	20.56%	5,811
Gallia	4,159	62.82%	2,388	36.07%	73	1.10%	1,771	26.75%	6,620
Geauga	2,816	69.77%	1,117	27.68%	103	2.55%	1,699	42.10%	4,036
Greene	5,100	62.95%	2,743	33.86%	259	3.20%	2,357	29.09%	8,102
Guernsey	5,014	59.44%	3,120	36.99%	301	3.57%	1,894	22.45%	8,435
Hamilton	55,466	56.88%	40,228	41.25%	1,821	1.87%	15,238	15.63%	97,515
Hancock	5,559	50.14%	5,322	48.01%	205	1.85%	237	2.14%	11,086
Hardin	4,389	50.07%	4,190	47.80%	187	2.13%	199	2.27%	8,766
Harrison	3,274	57.94%	2,261	40.01%	116	2.05%	1,013	17.93%	5,651
Henry	2,623	38.35%	4,157	60.77%	60	0.88%	-1,534	-22.43%	6,840
Highland	4,078	49.53%	3,938	47.83%	218	2.65%	140	1.70%	8,234
Hocking	2,923	49.58%	2,896	49.13%	76	1.29%	27	0.46%	5,895
Holmes	1,269	26.83%	3,394	71.75%	67	1.42%	-2,125	-44.93%	4,730
Huron	4,993	55.14%	3,906	43.14%	156	1.72%	1,087	12.00%	9,055
Jackson	4,932	58.89%	3,313	39.56%	130	1.55%	1,619	19.33%	8,375
Jefferson	6,470	62.25%	3,575	34.40%	348	3.35%	2,895	27.86%	10,393
Knox	4,011	50.56%	3,797	47.86%	125	1.58%	214	2.70%	7,933
Lake	3,929	68.41%	1,733	30.18%	81	1.41%	2,196	38.24%	5,743
Lawrence	5,505	64.97%	2,876	33.94%	92	1.09%	2,629	31.03%	8,473
Licking	5,854	46.09%	6,716	52.88%	130	1.02%	-862	-6.79%	12,700
Logan	4,806	60.38%	2,951	37.08%	202	2.54%	1,855	23.31%	7,959
Lorain	8,497	61.93%	4,989	36.36%	235	1.71%	3,508	25.57%	13,721
Lucas	17,128	51.20%	15,390	46.01%	932	2.79%	1,738	5.20%	33,450
Madison	3,197	55.58%	2,493	43.34%	62	1.08%	704	12.24%	5,752
Mahoning	8,939	53.57%	7,402	44.36%	345	2.07%	1,537	9.21%	16,686
Marion	3,770	47.03%	4,141	51.66%	105	1.31%	-371	-4.63%	8,016
Medina	3,510	58.25%	2,360	39.16%	156	2.59%	1,150	19.08%	6,026
Meigs	4,545	65.59%	2,237	32.28%	147	2.12%	2,308	33.31%	6,929
Mercer	2,015	30.69%	4,460	67.93%	91	1.39%	-2,445	-37.24%	6,566
Miami	6,197	53.86%	5,127	44.56%	181	1.57%	1,070	9.30%	11,505
Monroe	2,103	33.33%	4,143	65.66%	64	1.01%	-2,040	-32.33%	6,310
Montgomery	19,606	53.55%	16,236	44.34%	772	2.11%	3,370	9.20%	36,614
Morgan	2,639	53.40%	2,188	44.27%	115	2.33%	451	9.13%	4,942
Morrow	2,605	51.58%	2,278	45.11%	167	3.31%	327	6.48%	5,050
Muskingum	7,365	51.10%	6,667	46.25%	382	2.65%	698	4.84%	14,414
Noble	2,704	54.55%	2,173	43.84%	80	1.61%	531	10.71%	4,957
Ottawa	2,131	39.87%	3,185	59.59%	29	0.54%	-1,054	-19.72%	5,345
Paulding	3,597	51.64%	3,284	47.14%	85	1.22%	313	4.49%	6,966
Perry	4,180	52.59%	3,599	45.28%	170	2.14%	581	7.31%	7,949
Pickaway	3,201	43.42%	4,033	54.70%	139	1.89%	-832	-11.28%	7,373
Pike	2,342	53.98%	1,960	45.17%	37	0.85%	382	8.80%	4,339
Portage	4,311	52.68%	3,651	44.61%	222	2.71%	660	8.06%	8,184
Preble	3,548	51.43%	3,206	46.47%	145	2.10%	342	4.96%	6,899
Putnam	2,817	35.89%	4,943	62.98%	88	1.12%	-2,126	-27.09%	7,848
Richland	5,461	44.90%	6,581	54.11%	120	0.99%	-1,120	-9.21%	12,162
Ross	5,463	51.61%	5,035	47.56%	88	0.83%	428	4.04%	10,586
Sandusky	4,003	44.26%	4,915	54.35%	126	1.39%	-912	-10.08%	9,044
Scioto	5,756	60.15%	3,629	37.92%	185	1.93%	2,127	22.23%	9,570
Seneca	4,904	44.22%	5,946	53.62%	240	2.16%	-1,042	-9.40%	11,090
Shelby	2,482	38.67%	3,837	59.78%	100	1.56%	-1,355	-21.11%	6,419
Stark	13,165	54.12%	10,651	43.79%	509	2.09%	2,514	10.34%	24,325
Summit	10,072	53.08%	8,413	44.33%	491	2.59%	1,659	8.74%	18,976
Trumbull	7,723	65.71%	3,686	31.36%	344	2.93%	4,037	34.35%	11,753
Tuscarawas	6,355	47.19%	6,867	50.99%	245	1.82%	-512	-3.80%	13,467
Union	3,561	57.89%	2,484	40.38%	106	1.72%	1,077	17.51%	6,151
Van Wert	4,006	52.18%	3,582	46.65%	90	1.17%	424	5.52%	7,678
Vinton	2,141	56.06%	1,648	43.15%	30	0.79%	493	12.91%	3,819
Warren	4,311	60.59%	2,675	37.60%	129	1.81%	1,636	22.99%	7,115
Washington	6,542	53.91%	5,399	44.49%	195	1.61%	1,143	9.42%	12,136
Wayne	4,244	43.11%	5,263	53.46%	338	3.43%	-1,019	-10.35%	9,845
Williams	3,416	51.70%	3,049	46.15%	142	2.15%	367	5.55%	6,607
Wood	7,153	54.29%	5,752	43.66%	271	2.06%	1,401	10.63%	13,176
Wyandot	2,397	41.68%	3,268	56.82%	86	1.50%	-871	-15.15%	5,751
Totals	543,918	52.30%	474,882	45.66%	21,273	2.05%	69,036	6.64%	1,040,073

== See also ==
- United States presidential elections in Ohio
