= 1900 United States presidential election in Arkansas =

- November 6, 1900

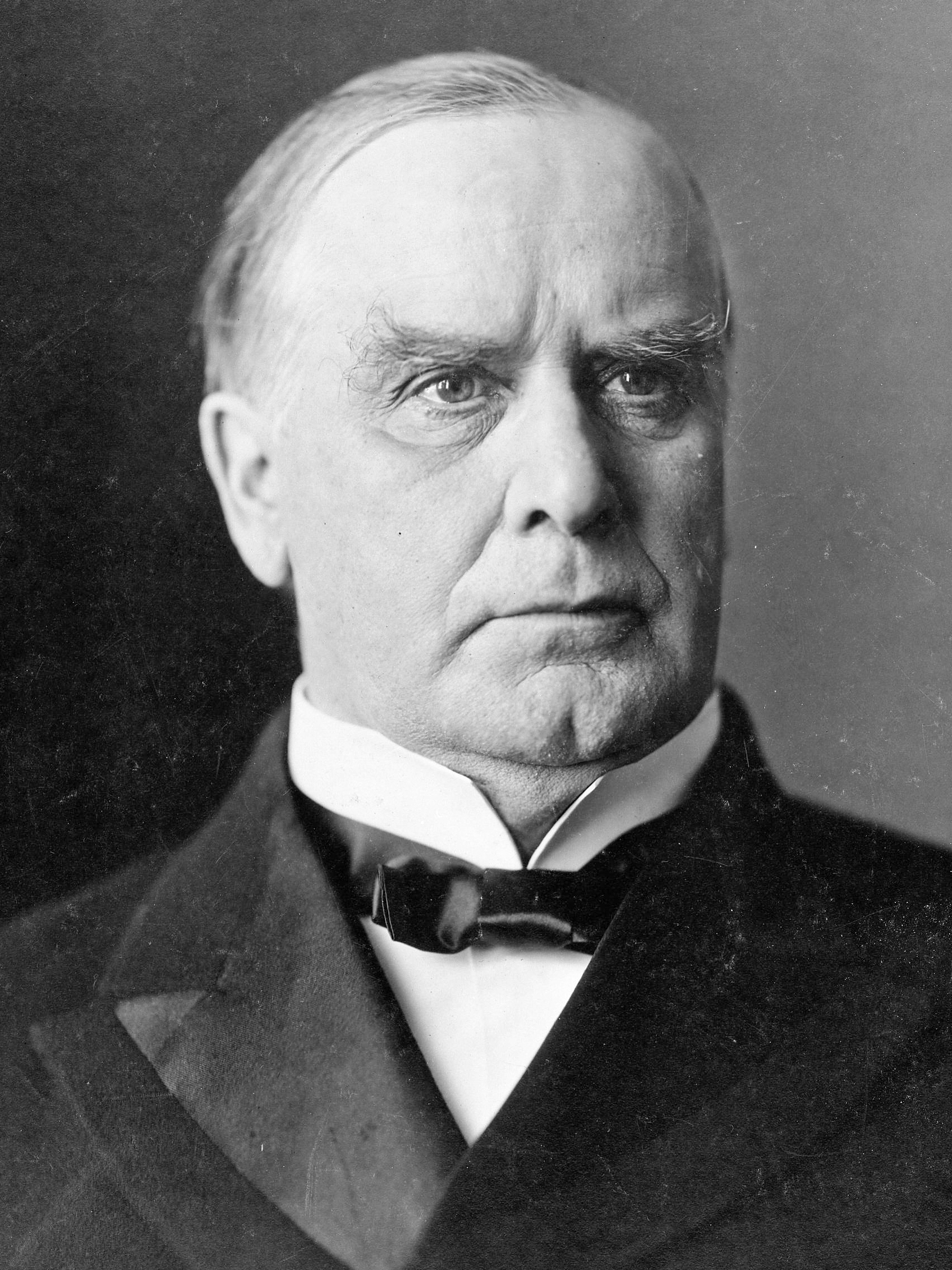
Nominee	William Jennings Bryan	William McKinley
Party	Democratic	Republican
Home state	Nebraska	Ohio
Running mate	Adlai Stevenson I	Theodore Roosevelt
Electoral vote	8	0
Popular vote	81,142	44,800
Percentage	63.46%	35.04%
County results
Bryan
40–50%
50–60%
60–70%
70–80%
80–90%
McKinley
40–50%
50–60%
60–70%
President before election
William McKinley
Republican
Elected President
William McKinley
Republican

The 1900 United States presidential election in Arkansas took place on November 6, 1900. All contemporary 45 states were part of the 1900 United States presidential election. Voters chose eight electors to the Electoral College, which selected the president and vice president.

Arkansas was won by the Democratic nominees, former U.S. Representative William Jennings Bryan of Nebraska and his running mate Adlai Stevenson I of Illinois. They defeated the Republican nominees, incumbent President William McKinley of Ohio and his running mate Theodore Roosevelt of New York. Bryan won the state by a margin of 28.42%.

Bryan had previously won Arkansas against McKinley four years earlier and would later win the state again in 1908 against William Howard Taft.

== Results ==
1900 United States presidential election in Arkansas
Party	Candidate	Votes	Percentage	Electoral votes
Democratic	William Jennings Bryan	81,142	63.46%	8
Republican	William McKinley (incumbent)	44,800	35.04%	0
Populist	Wharton Barker	972	0.76%	0
Prohibition	John G. Woolley	584	0.46%	0
Union Reform	Seth H. Ellis	341	0.27%	0
Write-ins	Scattered	27	0.02%	0
Totals		127,866	100.00%	8
Voter turnout				—

=== Results by county ===
1900 United States presidential election in Arkansas
County	William Jennings Bryan Democratic		William McKinley Republican		Various candidates Other parties		Margin		Total votes cast
County	#	%	#	%	#	%	#	%	Total votes cast
Arkansas	990	61.76%	598	37.31%	15	0.94%	392	24.45%	1,603
Ashley	1,381	71.63%	524	27.18%	23	1.19%	857	44.45%	1,928
Baxter	723	71.23%	287	28.28%	5	0.49%	436	42.96%	1,015
Benton	2,980	72.30%	1,087	26.37%	55	1.33%	1,893	45.92%	4,122
Boone	1,338	67.24%	641	32.21%	11	0.55%	697	35.03%	1,990
Bradley	842	83.61%	153	15.19%	12	1.19%	689	68.42%	1,007
Calhoun	654	72.67%	244	27.11%	2	0.22%	410	45.56%	900
Carroll	1,205	60.67%	735	37.01%	46	2.32%	470	23.67%	1,986
Chicot	269	37.73%	430	60.31%	14	1.96%	-161	-22.58%	713
Clark	1,232	58.14%	753	35.54%	134	6.32%	479	22.61%	2,119
Clay	1,195	65.09%	627	34.15%	14	0.76%	568	30.94%	1,836
Cleburne	520	63.49%	205	25.03%	94	11.48%	315	38.46%	819
Cleveland	876	74.81%	286	24.42%	9	0.77%	590	50.38%	1,171
Columbia	1,440	69.84%	606	29.39%	16	0.78%	834	40.45%	2,062
Conway	1,635	66.46%	805	32.72%	20	0.81%	830	33.74%	2,460
Craighead	1,326	70.68%	489	26.07%	61	3.25%	837	44.62%	1,876
Crawford	1,449	57.27%	1,060	41.90%	21	0.83%	389	15.38%	2,530
Crittenden	327	45.67%	381	53.21%	8	1.12%	-54	-7.54%	716
Cross	638	66.95%	312	32.74%	3	0.31%	326	34.21%	953
Dallas	746	58.56%	514	40.35%	14	1.10%	232	18.21%	1,274
Desha	328	64.95%	168	33.27%	9	1.78%	160	31.68%	505
Drew	1,099	65.22%	569	33.77%	17	1.01%	530	31.45%	1,685
Faulkner	1,191	62.32%	682	35.69%	38	1.99%	509	26.64%	1,911
Franklin	1,367	72.56%	485	25.74%	32	1.70%	882	46.82%	1,884
Fulton	984	70.74%	397	28.54%	10	0.72%	587	42.20%	1,391
Garland	940	56.59%	708	42.62%	13	0.78%	232	13.97%	1,661
Grant	574	76.64%	175	23.36%	0	0.00%	399	53.27%	749
Greene	1,091	71.45%	419	27.44%	17	1.11%	672	44.01%	1,527
Hempstead	1,352	49.93%	1,330	49.11%	26	0.96%	22	0.81%	2,708
Hot Spring	763	63.69%	423	35.31%	12	1.00%	340	28.38%	1,198
Howard	986	61.09%	585	36.25%	43	2.66%	401	24.85%	1,614
Independence	1,526	63.85%	782	32.72%	82	3.43%	744	31.13%	2,390
Izard	1,119	73.72%	381	25.10%	18	1.19%	738	48.62%	1,518
Jackson	1,050	63.29%	598	36.05%	11	0.66%	452	27.25%	1,659
Jefferson	1,363	47.93%	1,477	51.93%	4	0.14%	-114	-4.01%	2,844
Johnson	1,317	69.90%	552	29.30%	15	0.80%	765	40.61%	1,884
Lafayette	422	48.45%	448	51.44%	1	0.11%	-26	-2.99%	871
Lawrence	958	66.34%	476	32.96%	10	0.69%	482	33.38%	1,444
Lee	2,850	68.74%	1,296	31.26%	0	0.00%	1,554	37.48%	4,146
Lincoln	794	66.11%	392	32.64%	15	1.25%	402	33.47%	1,201
Little River	751	72.28%	281	27.05%	7	0.67%	470	45.24%	1,039
Logan	1,557	64.05%	848	34.88%	26	1.07%	709	29.16%	2,431
Lonoke	1,337	65.28%	679	33.15%	32	1.56%	658	32.13%	2,048
Madison	1,475	53.23%	1,289	46.52%	7	0.25%	186	6.71%	2,771
Marion	905	70.37%	375	29.16%	6	0.47%	530	41.21%	1,286
Miller	855	51.23%	759	45.48%	55	3.30%	96	5.75%	1,669
Mississippi	591	60.99%	378	39.01%	0	0.00%	213	21.98%	969
Monroe	708	63.73%	403	36.27%	0	0.00%	305	27.45%	1,111
Montgomery	468	60.94%	293	38.15%	7	0.91%	175	22.79%	768
Nevada	732	46.65%	744	47.42%	93	5.93%	-12	-0.76%	1,569
Newton	443	39.00%	690	60.74%	3	0.26%	-247	-21.74%	1,136
Ouachita	1,120	49.17%	1,143	50.18%	15	0.66%	-23	-1.01%	2,278
Perry	459	60.24%	293	38.45%	10	1.31%	166	21.78%	762
Phillips	1,349	77.31%	388	22.23%	8	0.46%	961	55.07%	1,745
Pike	566	57.81%	413	42.19%	0	0.00%	153	15.63%	979
Poinsett	520	74.07%	180	25.64%	2	0.28%	340	48.43%	702
Polk	922	66.47%	411	29.63%	54	3.89%	511	36.84%	1,387
Pope	1,871	68.74%	835	30.68%	16	0.59%	1,036	38.06%	2,722
Prairie	856	62.89%	496	36.44%	9	0.66%	360	26.45%	1,361
Pulaski	2,609	56.68%	1,932	41.97%	62	1.35%	677	14.71%	4,603
Randolph	1,385	75.93%	428	23.46%	11	0.60%	957	52.47%	1,824
St. Francis	634	46.76%	703	51.84%	19	1.40%	-69	-5.09%	1,356
Saline	811	68.79%	342	29.01%	26	2.21%	469	39.78%	1,179
Scott	733	68.83%	313	29.39%	19	1.78%	420	39.44%	1,065
Searcy	567	39.48%	869	60.52%	0	0.00%	-302	-21.03%	1,436
Sebastian	2,094	67.79%	964	31.21%	31	1.00%	1,130	36.58%	3,089
Sevier	772	67.36%	360	31.41%	14	1.22%	412	35.95%	1,146
Sharp	1,059	72.14%	394	26.84%	15	1.02%	665	45.30%	1,468
Stone	520	68.24%	231	30.31%	11	1.44%	289	37.93%	762
Union	1,238	77.57%	336	21.05%	22	1.38%	902	56.52%	1,596
Van Buren	599	55.06%	445	40.90%	44	4.04%	154	14.15%	1,088
Washington	2,658	64.33%	1,347	32.60%	127	3.07%	1,311	31.73%	4,132
White	1,694	63.21%	811	30.26%	175	6.53%	883	32.95%	2,680
Woodruff	990	64.04%	549	35.51%	7	0.45%	441	28.53%	1,546
Yell	1,554	65.68%	798	33.73%	14	0.59%	756	31.95%	2,366
Totals	81,242	63.50%	44,800	35.02%	1,897	1.48%	36,442	28.48%	127,939

== See also ==
- United States presidential elections in Arkansas
