= 1904 United States presidential election in Indiana =

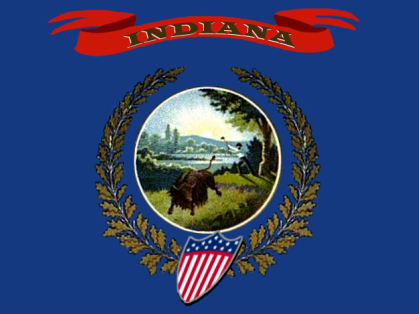
- November 8, 1904
- Turnout: 89.7% ▼2.4 pp
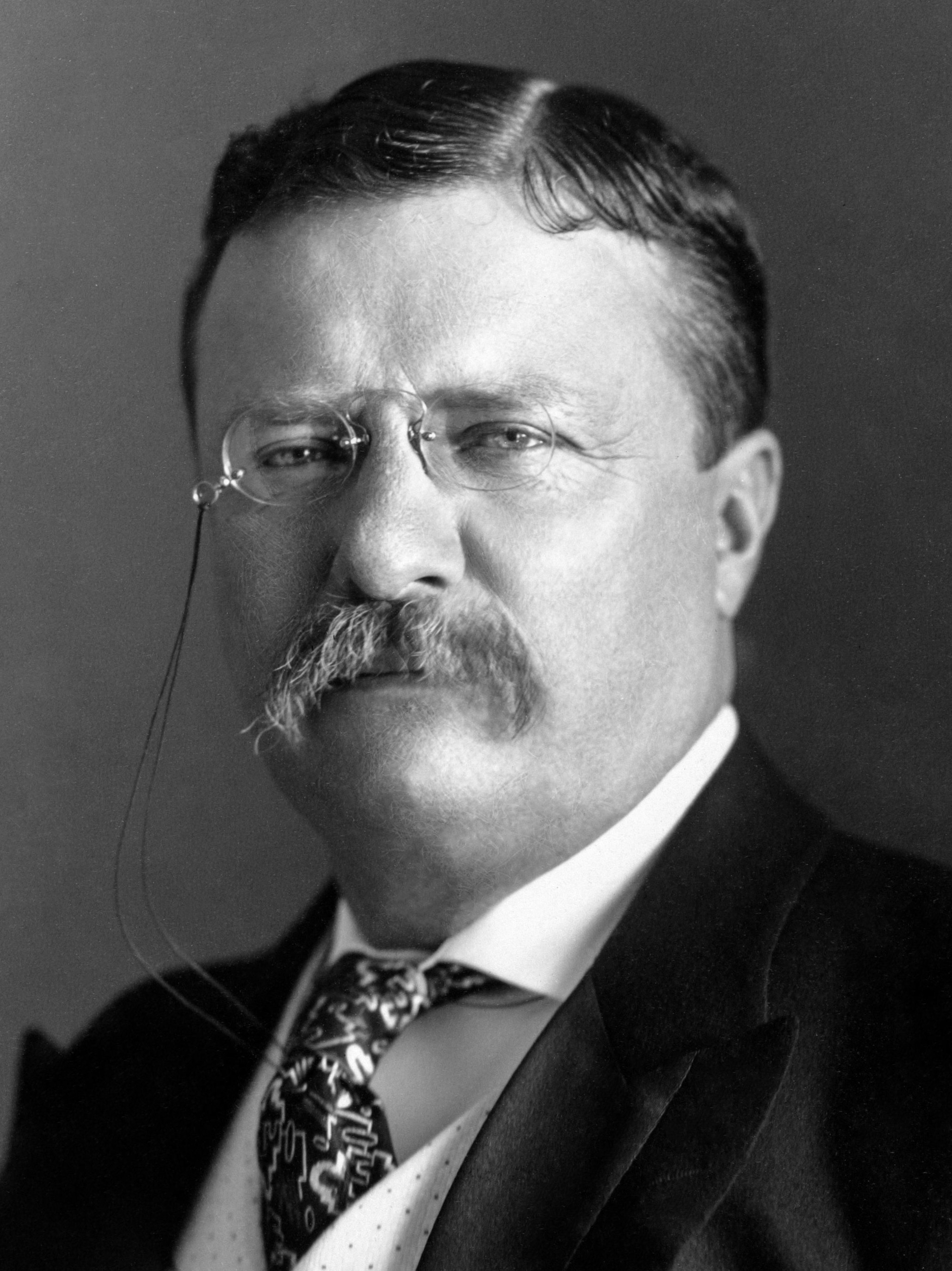

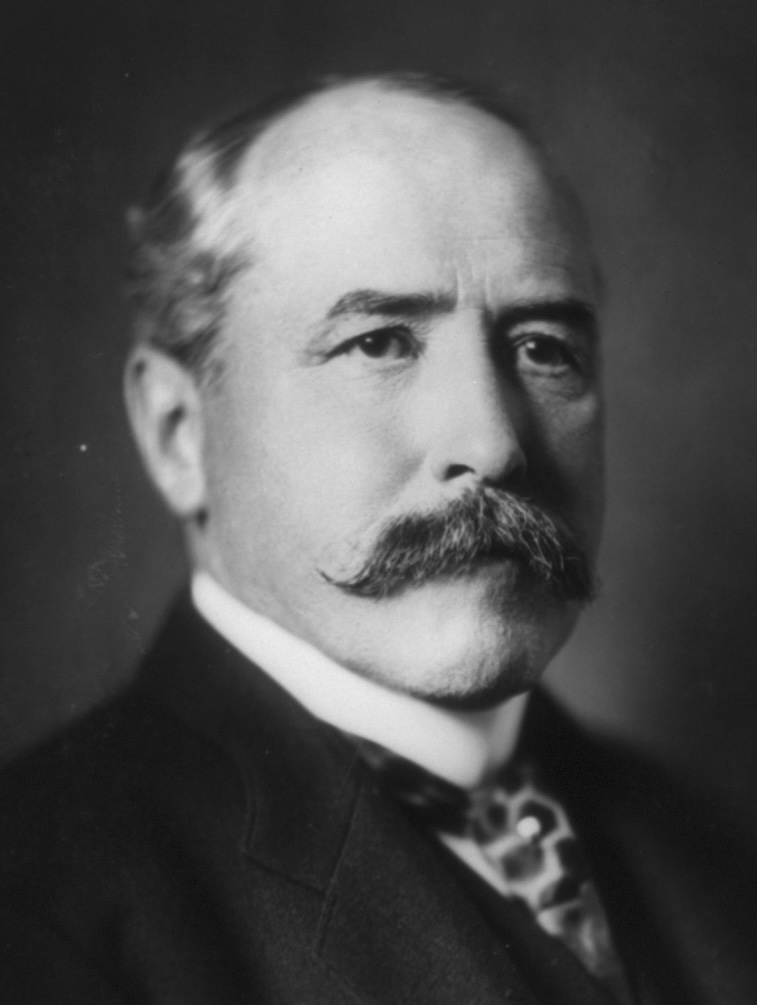
Nominee	Theodore Roosevelt	Alton B. Parker
Party	Republican	Democratic
Home state	New York	New York
Running mate	Charles W. Fairbanks	Henry G. Davis
Electoral vote	15	0
Popular vote	368,289	274,345
Percentage	53.98%	40.22%
County results
Roosevelt
40–50%
50–60%
60–70%
Parker
40–50%
50–60%
60–70%
President before election
Theodore Roosevelt
Republican
Elected President
Theodore Roosevelt
Republican

A presidential election was held in Indiana on November 8, 1904, as part of the 1904 United States presidential election. The Republican ticket of the incumbent president Theodore Roosevelt and the senior U.S. senator from Indiana Charles W. Fairbanks defeated the Democratic ticket of the chief judge of the New York Court of Appeals Alton B. Parker and the former U.S. senator from West Virginia Henry G. Davis. Roosevelt defeated Parker in the national election with 336 electoral votes.

== General election ==
=== Results ===
Indiana chose 15 electors on a statewide general ticket. State law required voters to elect each member of the Electoral College individually, rather than as a group. This sometimes resulted in small differences in the number of votes cast for electors pledged to the same presidential candidate, if some voters did not vote for all the electors nominated by a party. The following table quotes the official returns published by the secretary of state of Indiana, which list the votes for the first elector on each ticket.

1904 United States presidential election in Indiana (Note: The official returns show 274,345 for the leading Democratic elector, but the tabulated county results add up to 274,356.)
Party	Candidate	Votes	%	±%
Republican	Theodore Roosevelt Charles W. Fairbanks	368,289	53.98	▲3.38
Democratic	Alton B. Parker Henry G. Davis	274,356	40.22	▼6.42
Prohibition	Silas C. Swallow George Washington Carroll	23,496	3.44	▲1.37
Socialist	Eugene V. Debs Ben Hanford	12,013	1.76	▲1.40
Populist	Thomas E. Watson Thomas Tibbles	2,444	0.36	▲0.14
Socialist Labor	Charles Hunter Corregan William W. Cox	1,598	0.23	▲0.13
Total votes		682,196	100.00	

=== Results by county ===
1904 United States presidential election in Indiana by county
County	Theodore Roosevelt Republican		Alton B. Parker Democratic		Silas C. Swallow Prohibition		Eugene V. Debs Socialist		Others		Margin		Total
County	Votes	%	Votes	%	Votes	%	Votes	%	Votes	%	Votes	%	Total
Adams	1,967	37.92%	2,973	57.32%	223	4.30%	9	0.17%	15	0.29%	-1,006	-19.39%	5,187
Allen	10,261	50.38%	9,250	45.42%	276	1.36%	470	2.31%	110	0.54%	1,011	4.96%	20,367
Bartholomew	3,510	51.60%	3,038	44.66%	138	2.03%	98	1.44%	18	0.26%	472	6.94%	6,802
Benton	2,098	56.60%	1,470	39.65%	132	3.56%	1	0.03%	6	0.16%	628	16.94%	3,707
Blackford	2,521	51.39%	2,058	41.95%	260	5.30%	37	0.75%	30	0.61%	463	9.44%	4,906
Boone	3,633	50.20%	3,263	45.09%	227	3.14%	19	0.26%	95	1.31%	370	5.11%	7,237
Brown	760	37.36%	1,157	56.88%	93	4.57%	7	0.34%	17	0.84%	-397	-19.52%	2,034
Carroll	2,671	49.96%	2,420	45.27%	220	4.12%	14	0.26%	21	0.39%	251	4.70%	5,346
Cass	5,282	52.09%	4,357	42.96%	389	3.84%	52	0.51%	61	0.60%	925	9.12%	10,141
Clark	3,644	48.79%	3,587	48.03%	85	1.14%	133	1.78%	19	0.25%	57	0.76%	7,468
Clay	4,005	48.01%	3,565	42.74%	225	2.70%	432	5.18%	115	1.38%	440	5.27%	8,342
Clinton	4,053	53.10%	3,112	40.77%	338	4.43%	56	0.73%	74	0.97%	941	12.33%	7,633
Crawford	1,470	45.99%	1,509	47.22%	200	6.26%	6	0.19%	11	0.34%	-39	-1.22%	3,196
Daviess	3,682	52.97%	2,802	40.31%	169	2.43%	148	2.13%	150	2.16%	880	12.66%	6,951
De Kalb	3,416	49.97%	2,827	41.35%	343	5.02%	154	2.25%	96	1.40%	589	8.62%	6,836
Dearborn	2,588	42.99%	3,264	54.22%	101	1.68%	62	1.03%	5	0.08%	-676	-11.23%	6,020
Decatur	3,178	55.48%	2,341	40.87%	153	2.67%	41	0.72%	15	0.26%	837	14.61%	5,728
Delaware	8,522	63.36%	3,673	27.31%	784	5.83%	362	2.69%	109	0.81%	4,849	36.05%	13,450
Dubois	1,413	30.77%	3,119	67.92%	47	1.02%	5	0.11%	8	0.17%	-1,706	-37.15%	4,592
Elkhart	6,548	55.32%	4,023	33.99%	721	6.09%	472	3.99%	73	0.62%	2,525	21.33%	11,837
Fayette	2,414	58.01%	1,487	35.74%	141	3.39%	107	2.57%	12	0.29%	927	22.28%	4,161
Floyd	3,666	49.10%	3,421	45.81%	108	1.45%	235	3.15%	37	0.50%	245	3.28%	7,467
Fountain	3,060	52.08%	2,560	43.57%	183	3.11%	14	0.24%	59	1.00%	500	8.51%	5,876
Franklin	1,757	40.36%	2,501	57.45%	87	2.00%	3	0.07%	5	0.11%	-744	-17.09%	4,353
Fulton	2,394	50.02%	2,182	45.59%	184	3.84%	17	0.36%	9	0.19%	212	4.43%	4,786
Gibson	3,871	51.27%	3,221	42.66%	331	4.38%	91	1.21%	36	0.48%	650	8.61%	7,550
Grant	9,550	58.27%	4,668	28.48%	1,760	10.74%	281	1.71%	129	0.79%	4,882	29.79%	16,388
Greene	4,698	53.13%	3,559	40.25%	118	1.33%	377	4.26%	91	1.03%	1,139	12.88%	8,843
Hamilton	4,832	63.50%	2,469	32.44%	267	3.51%	16	0.21%	26	0.34%	2,363	31.05%	7,610
Hancock	2,633	46.39%	2,806	49.44%	212	3.74%	7	0.12%	18	0.32%	-173	-3.05%	5,676
Harrison	2,544	48.09%	2,530	47.83%	151	2.85%	44	0.83%	21	0.40%	14	0.26%	5,290
Hendricks	3,434	58.82%	2,164	37.07%	215	3.68%	5	0.09%	20	0.34%	1,270	21.75%	5,838
Henry	4,391	59.99%	2,482	33.91%	403	5.51%	17	0.23%	26	0.36%	1,909	26.08%	7,319
Howard	5,014	61.18%	2,098	25.60%	808	9.86%	211	2.57%	65	0.79%	2,916	35.58%	8,196
Huntington	4,385	52.52%	3,290	39.41%	435	5.21%	207	2.48%	32	0.38%	1,095	13.12%	8,349
Jackson	2,775	42.94%	3,467	53.65%	187	2.89%	15	0.23%	18	0.28%	-692	-10.71%	6,462
Jasper	2,137	58.58%	1,341	36.76%	151	4.14%	4	0.11%	15	0.41%	796	21.82%	3,648
Jay	3,612	51.78%	2,702	38.74%	622	8.92%	9	0.13%	30	0.43%	910	13.05%	6,975
Jefferson	3,195	53.20%	2,542	42.32%	200	3.33%	50	0.83%	19	0.32%	653	10.87%	6,006
Jennings	2,139	54.26%	1,688	42.82%	93	2.36%	5	0.13%	17	0.43%	451	11.44%	3,942
Johnson	2,574	44.44%	2,882	49.76%	300	5.18%	10	0.17%	26	0.45%	-308	-5.32%	5,792
Knox	4,278	47.94%	4,093	45.87%	265	2.97%	200	2.24%	87	0.98%	185	2.07%	8,923
Kosciusko	4,550	57.88%	2,913	37.06%	348	4.43%	15	0.19%	35	0.45%	1,637	20.82%	7,861
La Porte	5,952	55.68%	4,472	41.84%	136	1.27%	89	0.83%	40	0.37%	1,480	13.85%	10,689
Lagrange	2,461	64.61%	1,100	28.88%	224	5.88%	13	0.34%	11	0.29%	1,361	35.73%	3,809
Lake	6,429	64.11%	2,933	29.25%	115	1.15%	386	3.85%	165	1.65%	3,496	34.86%	10,028
Lawrence	3,924	57.93%	2,672	39.44%	97	1.43%	58	0.86%	23	0.34%	1,252	18.48%	6,774
Madison	9,697	53.65%	6,681	36.96%	805	4.45%	822	4.55%	69	0.38%	3,016	16.69%	18,074
Marion	35,103	58.54%	22,336	37.25%	1,061	1.77%	1,067	1.78%	396	0.66%	12,767	21.29%	59,963
Marshall	3,001	48.39%	2,878	46.40%	230	3.71%	32	0.52%	61	0.98%	123	1.98%	6,202
Martin	1,809	52.21%	1,574	45.43%	55	1.59%	9	0.26%	18	0.52%	235	6.78%	3,465
Miami	4,124	49.53%	3,605	43.29%	388	4.66%	157	1.89%	53	0.64%	519	6.23%	8,327
Monroe	3,042	55.81%	2,286	41.94%	98	1.80%	6	0.11%	19	0.35%	756	13.87%	5,451
Montgomery	4,647	53.10%	3,747	42.82%	297	3.39%	19	0.22%	41	0.47%	900	10.28%	8,751
Morgan	3,119	54.12%	2,428	42.13%	166	2.88%	37	0.64%	13	0.23%	691	11.99%	5,763
Newton	1,803	62.22%	951	32.82%	123	4.24%	8	0.28%	13	0.45%	852	29.40%	2,898
Noble	3,683	55.57%	2,785	42.02%	127	1.92%	15	0.23%	18	0.27%	898	13.55%	6,628
Ohio	662	51.48%	584	45.41%	34	2.64%	6	0.47%	0	0.00%	78	6.07%	1,286
Orange	2,458	55.25%	1,888	42.44%	80	1.80%	19	0.43%	4	0.09%	570	12.81%	4,449
Owen	1,721	46.26%	1,841	49.49%	95	2.55%	35	0.94%	28	0.75%	-120	-3.23%	3,720
Parke	3,468	55.49%	2,176	34.82%	464	7.42%	115	1.84%	27	0.43%	1,292	20.67%	6,250
Perry	2,105	48.89%	2,142	49.74%	29	0.67%	23	0.53%	7	0.16%	-37	-0.86%	4,306
Pike	2,596	51.81%	2,224	44.38%	113	2.26%	57	1.14%	21	0.42%	372	7.42%	5,011
Porter	3,162	66.39%	1,437	30.17%	72	1.51%	70	1.47%	22	0.46%	1,725	36.22%	4,763
Posey	2,419	44.32%	2,825	51.76%	124	2.27%	57	1.04%	33	0.60%	-406	-7.44%	5,458
Pulaski	1,729	48.61%	1,648	46.33%	155	4.36%	10	0.28%	15	0.42%	81	2.28%	3,557
Putnam	2,586	44.36%	3,005	51.54%	176	3.02%	27	0.46%	36	0.62%	-419	-7.19%	5,830
Randolph	5,139	67.49%	1,924	25.27%	495	6.50%	34	0.45%	23	0.30%	3,215	42.22%	7,615
Ripley	2,850	52.29%	2,457	45.08%	78	1.43%	52	0.95%	13	0.24%	393	7.21%	5,450
Rush	3,082	54.12%	2,363	41.49%	225	3.95%	10	0.18%	15	0.26%	719	12.63%	5,695
Scott	953	44.85%	1,090	51.29%	68	3.20%	3	0.14%	11	0.52%	-137	-6.45%	2,125
Shelby	3,660	48.21%	3,550	46.76%	294	3.87%	22	0.29%	66	0.87%	110	1.45%	7,592
Spencer	3,017	53.57%	2,495	44.30%	85	1.51%	26	0.46%	9	0.16%	522	9.27%	5,632
St. Joseph	11,166	62.54%	5,967	33.42%	311	1.74%	318	1.78%	92	0.52%	5,199	29.12%	17,854
Starke	1,523	54.47%	1,134	40.56%	46	1.65%	87	3.11%	6	0.21%	389	13.91%	2,796
Steuben	2,864	66.59%	1,260	29.30%	150	3.49%	12	0.28%	15	0.35%	1,604	37.29%	4,301
Sullivan	3,076	42.17%	3,641	49.91%	314	4.30%	200	2.74%	64	0.88%	-565	-7.75%	7,295
Switzerland	1,461	47.48%	1,554	50.50%	46	1.49%	11	0.36%	5	0.16%	-93	-3.02%	3,077
Tippecanoe	6,581	59.83%	4,031	36.65%	261	2.37%	86	0.78%	41	0.37%	2,550	23.18%	11,000
Tipton	2,654	50.75%	2,279	43.58%	233	4.46%	13	0.25%	51	0.98%	375	7.17%	5,230
Union	1,156	57.51%	758	37.71%	86	4.28%	3	0.15%	7	0.35%	398	19.80%	2,010
Vanderburgh	8,624	51.65%	5,885	35.25%	268	1.61%	1,780	10.66%	139	0.83%	2,739	16.41%	16,696
Vermillion	2,724	59.39%	1,437	31.33%	238	5.19%	141	3.07%	47	1.02%	1,287	28.06%	4,587
Vigo	10,327	56.33%	6,625	36.14%	349	1.90%	814	4.44%	217	1.18%	3,702	20.19%	18,332
Wabash	4,516	59.44%	2,381	31.34%	453	5.96%	207	2.72%	40	0.53%	2,135	28.10%	7,597
Warren	2,208	66.77%	964	29.15%	113	3.42%	2	0.06%	20	0.60%	1,244	37.62%	3,307
Warrick	2,796	50.49%	2,485	44.87%	116	2.09%	130	2.35%	11	0.20%	311	5.62%	5,538
Washington	2,094	45.35%	2,364	51.20%	132	2.86%	7	0.15%	20	0.43%	-270	-5.85%	4,617
Wayne	7,390	66.32%	3,116	27.96%	320	2.87%	280	2.51%	37	0.33%	4,274	38.36%	11,143
Wells	2,565	40.74%	3,127	49.67%	490	7.78%	74	1.18%	40	0.64%	-562	-8.93%	6,296
White	2,679	53.02%	2,096	41.48%	228	4.51%	31	0.61%	19	0.38%	583	11.54%	5,053
Whitley	2,359	48.99%	2,281	47.37%	140	2.91%	15	0.31%	20	0.42%	78	1.62%	4,815
TOTAL	368,289	53.98%	274,356	40.22%	23,496	3.44%	12,013	1.76%	4,042	0.59%	93,933	13.76%	682,196

== See also ==
- United States presidential elections in Indiana

== Bibliography ==
- Indiana (1904). Election Law of Indiana [...]. Indianapolis: State Board of Election Commissioners.
- Madison, James H. (1986). The Indiana Way: A State History. Bloomington: Indiana University Press.
- Petersen, Svend (1963). A Statistical History of the American Presidential Elections. New York: Frederick Ungar Publishing Company. LCCN 62-21786.
- Storms, Daniel E. (1904). Biennial Report of Daniel E. Storms, Secretary of State of the State of Indiana [...]. Indianapolis.
