= 1904 United States presidential election in New York =

- November 8, 1904
- Turnout: 83.3% ▼1.3 pp
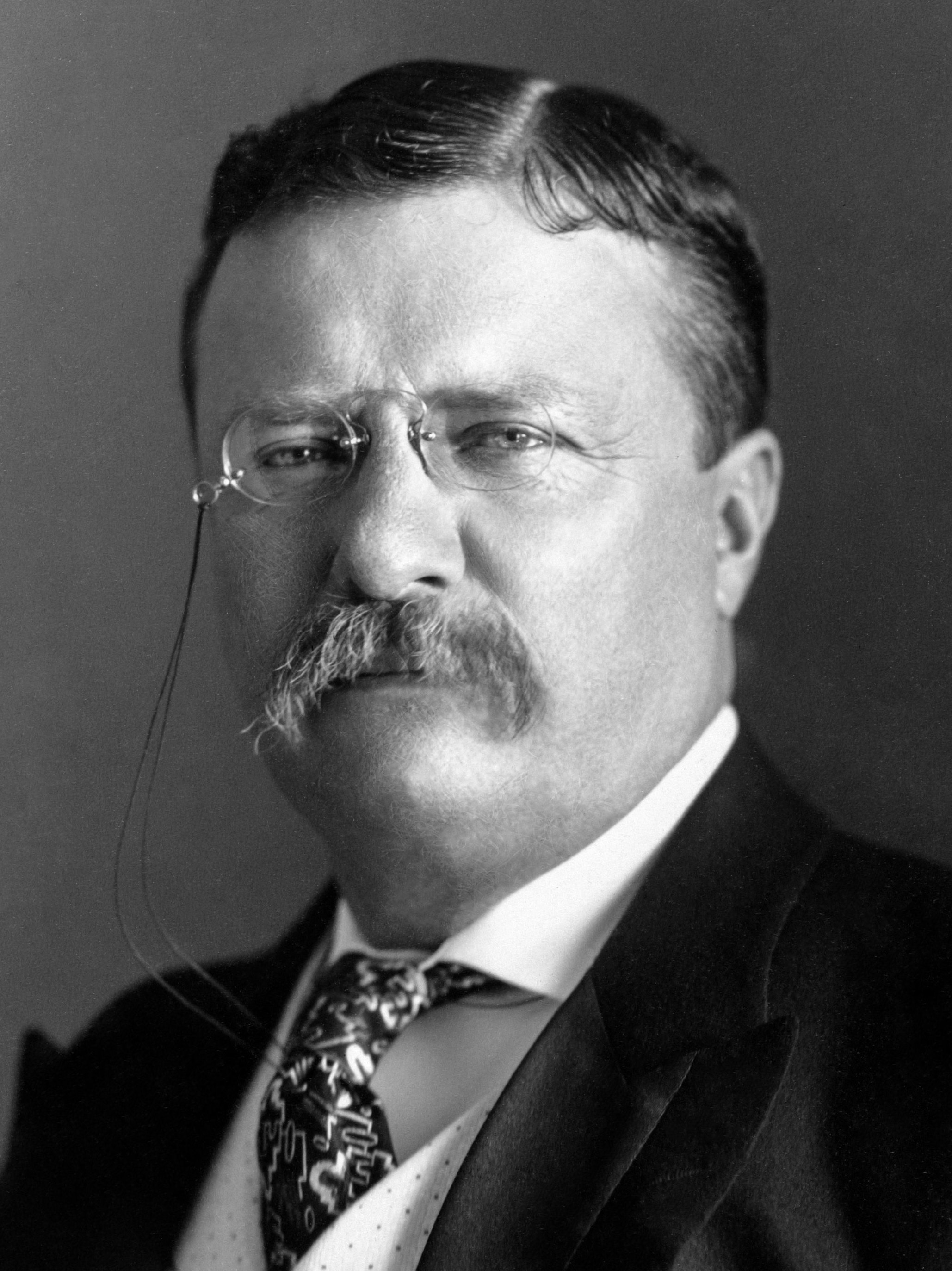

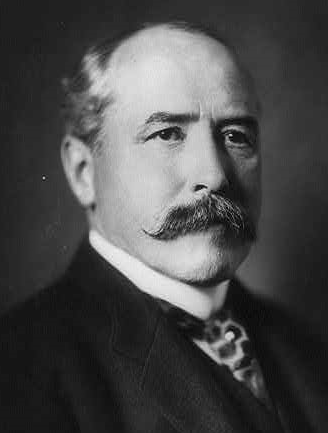
Nominee	Theodore Roosevelt	Alton B. Parker
Party	Republican	Democratic
Home state	New York	New York
Running mate	Charles W. Fairbanks	Henry G. Davis
Electoral vote	39	0
Popular vote	859,533	683,981
Percentage	53.13%	42.28%
County results
Roosevelt
40–50%
50–60%
60–70%
70–80%
Parker
40–50%
50–60%
President before election
Theodore Roosevelt
Republican
Elected President
Theodore Roosevelt
Republican

The 1904 United States presidential election in New York took place on November 8, 1904. All contemporary 45 states were part of the 1904 United States presidential election. Voters chose 39 electors to the Electoral College, who selected the president and vice president.

New York was the home state of both major party nominees, Republican nominee, incumbent President Theodore Roosevelt and Democratic nominee, Chief Judge of the New York Court of Appeals Alton B. Parker. New York was won by Roosevelt and his running mate Charles W. Fairbanks of Indiana, defeating Parker and his running mate Senator Henry G. Davis of West Virginia. Also in the running was the Socialist Party candidate, Eugene V. Debs, who ran with Ben Hanford.

Roosevelt carried New York with 53.13% of the vote to Parker's 42.28%, a victory margin of 10.85%. Debs finished a distant third, receiving 2.28% of the vote in the state.

While New York would continue its Republican dominance of the Fourth Party System, with New York being the home state of both major party candidates in 1904, the state's results were relatively close despite Roosevelt's nationwide landslide. The state was about 8 points more Democratic than the national average primarily due to Alton Parker's popularity in the New York City area, with Parker winning majorities in Manhattan, The Bronx, Queens, and winning a plurality on Staten Island.

== Results ==
1904 United States presidential election in New York
Party	Candidate	Votes	Percentage	Electoral votes
Republican	Theodore Roosevelt (incumbent)	859,533	53.13%	39
Democratic	Alton B. Parker	683,981	42.28%	0
Socialist	Eugene V. Debs	36,883	2.28%	0
Prohibition	Silas C. Swallow	20,787	1.28%	0
Socialist Labor	Charles H. Corregan	9,127	0.56%	0
People's	Thomas E. Watson	7,459	0.46%	0
Totals		1,617,770	100.00%	39

=== New York City results ===
1904 Presidential Election in New York City		Manhattan	The Bronx	Brooklyn	Queens	Staten Island	Total	
Democratic	Alton B. Parker	189,712		111,855	18,151	7,182	326,900	50.13%
Democratic	Alton B. Parker	51.54%		47.53%	53.36%	48.96%	326,900	50.13%
Republican	Theodore Roosevelt	155,003		113,246	14,096	7,000	289,345	44.37%
Republican	Theodore Roosevelt	42.11%		48.12%	41.44%	47.72%	289,345	44.37%
Socialist	Eugene V. Debs	16,472		6,598	1,288	154	24,512	3.76%
Socialist	Eugene V. Debs	4.48%		2.80%	3.79%	1.05%	24,512	3.76%
Socialist Labor	Charles H. Corregan	3,538		1,341	202	90	5,171	0.79%
Socialist Labor	Charles H. Corregan	0.96%		0.57%	0.59%	0.61%	5,171	0.79%
People's	Thomas E. Watson	2,821		1,758	212	118	4,909	0.75%
People's	Thomas E. Watson	0.77%		0.75%	0.62%	0.80%	4,909	0.75%
Prohibition	Silas C. Swallow	526		519	68	124	1,237	0.19%
Prohibition	Silas C. Swallow	0.14%		0.22%	0.20%	0.85%	1,237	0.19%
TOTAL		368,072		235,317	34,017	14,668	652,074	100.00%

=== Results by county ===
County	Theodore Roosevelt Republican		Alton B. Parker Democratic		Eugene V. Debs Socialist		Silas C. Swallow Prohibition		Charles H. Corregan Socialist Labor		Thomas E. Watson Populist		Margin		Total votes cast
County	#	%	#	%	#	%	#	%	#	%	#	%	#	%	Total votes cast
Albany	24,964	56.13%	18,768	42.20%	330	0.74%	203	0.46%	146	0.33%	67	0.15%	6,196	13.93%	44,478
Allegany	7,835	68.91%	2,718	23.91%	86	0.76%	651	5.73%	27	0.24%	53	0.47%	5,117	45.00%	11,370
Broome	10,853	59.53%	6,480	35.55%	108	0.59%	670	3.68%	20	0.11%	99	0.54%	4,373	23.99%	18,230
Cattaraugus	10,182	63.96%	4,923	30.93%	206	1.29%	494	3,10%	44	0.28%	70	0.44%	5,259	33.04%	15,919
Cayuga	10,708	62.88%	5,707	33.52%	171	1.00%	292	1.71%	89	0.52%	61	0.36%	5,001	29.37%	17,028
Chautauqua	15,891	69.77%	5,295	23.25%	691	3.03%	648	2.85%	168	0.74%	82	0.36%	10,596	46.52%	22,775
Chemung	7,282	53.29%	5,641	41.28%	378	2.77%	293	2.14%	42	0.31%	28	0.20%	1,641	12.01%	13,664
Chenango	6,394	59.77%	3,817	35.68%	68	0.64%	373	3.49%	21	0.20%	24	0.22%	2,577	24.09%	10,697
Clinton	6,327	59.06%	3,988	37.23%	23	0.21%	348	3.25%	10	0.09%	16	0.15%	2,339	21.84%	10,712
Columbia	5,996	52.38%	5,245	45.82%	45	0.39%	119	1.04%	17	0.15%	25	0.22%	751	6.56%	11,447
Cortland	5,222	63.34%	2,649	32.13%	26	0.32%	324	3.93%	6	0.07%	17	0.21%	2,573	31.21%	8,244
Delaware	7,628	61.54%	4,347	35.07%	25	0.20%	345	2.78%	8	0.06%	43	0.35%	3,281	26.47%	12,396
Dutchess	11,709	57.06%	8,275	40.32%	102	0.50%	349	1.70%	42	0.20%	44	0.21%	3,434	16.73%	20,521
Erie	49,669	55.73%	36,582	41.04%	1,334	1.50%	667	0.75%	685	0.77%	195	0.22%	13,087	14.68%	89,132
Essex	5,385	70.88%	2,028	26.69%	75	0.99%	79	1.04%	17	0.22%	13	0.17%	3,357	44.19%	7,597
Franklin	6,699	67.60%	2,869	28.95%	61	0.62%	232	2.34%	15	0.15%	34	0.34%	3,830	38.65%	9,910
Fulton	6,521	56.88%	3,884	33.88%	463	4.04%	417	3.64%	130	1.13%	49	0.43%	2,637	23.00%	11,464
Genesee	5,810	63.89%	2,883	31.70%	109	1.20%	242	2.66%	38	0.42%	12	0.13%	2,927	32.19%	9,094
Greene	4,527	52.27%	3,845	44.39%	87	1.00%	166	1.92%	19	0.22%	17	0.20%	682	7.87%	8,661
Hamilton	688	50.74%	655	48.30%	2	0.15%	11	0.81%	0	0.00%	0	0.00%	33	2.43%	1,356
Herkimer	8,319	56.80%	5,827	39.79%	188	1.28%	235	1.60%	41	0.28%	35	0.24%	2,492	17.02%	14,645
Jefferson	12,050	60.57%	6,696	33.66%	449	2.26%	622	3.13%	56	0.28%	20	0.10%	5,354	26.91%	19,893
Kings	113,246	48.12%	111,855	47.53%	6,598	2.80%	519	0.22%	1,341	0.57%	1,758	0.75%	1,391	0.59%	235,317
Lewis	4,242	58.53%	2,842	39.21%	34	0.47%	116	1.60%	7	0.10%	7	0.10%	1,400	19.32%	7,248
Livingston	5,884	61.46%	3,252	33.97%	46	0.48%	304	3.18%	63	0.66%	25	0.26%	2,632	27.49%	9,574
Madison	6,947	63.48%	3,410	31.16%	159	1.45%	374	3.42%	34	0.31%	19	0.17%	3,537	32.32%	10,943
Monroe	30,772	60.27%	16,544	32.41%	2,263	4.43%	1,023	2.00%	343	0.67%	108	0.21%	14,228	27.87%	51,053
Montgomery	7,444	57.29%	5,209	40.09%	88	0.68%	154	1.19%	54	0.42%	44	0.34%	2,235	17.20%	12,993
Nassau	8,222	60.02%	5,282	38.56%	39	0.28%	79	0.58%	16	0.12%	61	0.45%	2,940	21.46%	13,699
New York	155,003	42.11%	189,712	51.54%	16,472	4.48%	526	0.14%	3,538	0.96%	2,821	0.77%	-34,709	-9.43%	368,072
Niagara	10,881	56.81%	7,550	39.42%	163	0.85%	479	2.50%	45	0.23%	37	0.19%	3,331	17.39%	19,155
Oneida	19,243	55.66%	14,064	40.68%	391	1.13%	605	1.75%	157	0.45%	111	0.32%	5,179	14.98%	34,571
Onondaga	27,115	62.60%	14,633	33.78%	700	1.62%	561	1.30%	266	0.61%	42	0.10%	12,482	28.82%	43,317
Ontario	8,184	59.36%	5,283	38.32%	34	0.25%	254	1.84%	8	0.06%	25	0.18%	2,901	21.04%	13,788
Orange	14,222	56.93%	9,882	39.55%	344	1.38%	328	1.31%	123	0.49%	84	0.34%	4,340	17.37%	24,983
Orleans	5,027	63.49%	2,502	31.60%	53	0.67%	303	3.83%	16	0.20%	17	0.21%	2,525	31.89%	7,918
Oswego	11,174	60.63%	6,152	33.38%	114	0.62%	924	5.01%	34	0.18%	32	0.17%	5,022	27.25%	18,430
Otsego	7,770	55.44%	5,725	40.85%	56	0.40%	423	3.02%	19	0.14%	21	0.15%	2,045	14.59%	14,014
Putnam	2,316	61.43%	1,395	37.00%	12	0.32%	28	0.74%	7	0.19%	12	0.32%	921	24.43%	3,770
Queens	14,096	41.44%	18,151	53.36%	1,288	3.79%	68	0.20%	202	0.59%	212	0.62%	-4,055	-11.92%	34,017
Rensselaer	17,631	56.72%	12,529	40.31%	323	1.04%	350	1.13%	165	0.53%	87	0.28%	5,102	16.41%	31,085
Richmond	7,000	47.72%	7,182	48.96%	154	1.05%	124	0.85%	90	0.61%	118	0.80%	-182	-1.24%	14,668
Rockland	4,283	48.99%	4,246	48.57%	63	0.72%	90	1.03%	19	0.22%	41	0.47%	37	0.42%	8,742
Saratoga	9,546	58.46%	6,149	37.66%	152	0.93%	418	2.56%	32	0.20%	32	0.20%	3,397	20.80%	16,329
Schenectady	9,535	57.74%	5,981	36.22%	434	2.63%	201	1.22%	311	1.88%	53	0.32%	3,554	21.52%	16,515
Schoharie	3,672	46.22%	4,010	50.47%	9	0.11%	220	2.77%	8	0.10%	26	0.33%	-338	-4.25%	7,945
Schuyler	2,570	58.78%	1,621	37.08%	13	0.30%	150	3.43%	3	0.07%	15	0.34%	949	21.71%	4,372
Seneca	3,823	52.53%	3,288	45.18%	37	0.51%	114	1.57%	9	0.12%	7	0.10%	535	7.35%	7,278
St. Lawrence	15,274	70.43%	5,798	26.74%	71	0.33%	466	2.15%	35	0.16%	42	0.19%	9,476	43.70%	21,686
Steuben	12,680	59.66%	7,364	34.65%	246	1.16%	872	4.10%	44	0.21%	47	0.22%	5,316	25.01%	21,253
Suffolk	9,937	57.19%	6,795	39.11%	143	0.82%	382	2.20%	36	0.21%	81	0.47%	3,142	18.08%	17,374
Sullivan	4,452	54.37%	3,582	43.74%	26	0.32%	101	1.23%	13	0.16%	15	0.18%	870	10.62%	8,189
Tioga	4,628	59.99%	2,840	36.82%	14	0.18%	211	2.74%	7	0.09%	14	0.18%	1,788	23.18%	7,714
Tompkins	5,414	56.31%	3,780	39.31%	88	0.92%	295	3.07%	14	0.15%	24	0.25%	1,634	16.99%	9,615
Ulster	11,356	53.13%	9,516	44.52%	92	0.43%	336	1.57%	28	0.13%	45	0.21%	1,840	8.61%	21,373
Warren	4,943	61.47%	2,756	34.27%	101	1.26%	181	2.25%	31	0.39%	29	0.36%	2,187	27.20%	8,041
Washington	8,324	67.37%	3,517	28.47%	112	0.91%	352	2.85%	25	0.20%	25	0.20%	4,807	38.91%	12,355
Wayne	8,081	63.87%	4,140	32.72%	74	0.58%	326	2.58%	17	0.13%	15	0.12%	3,941	31.15%	12,653
Westchester	25,101	55.93%	18,093	40.32%	808	1.80%	309	0.69%	307	0.68%	261	0.58%	7,008	15.62%	44,879
Wyoming	5,456	65.76%	2,477	29.85%	31	0.37%	300	3.62%	16	0.19%	17	0.20%	2,979	35.90%	8,297
Yates	3,380	63.63%	1,752	32.98%	11	0.21%	141	2.65%	3	0.06%	25	0.47%	1,628	30.65%	5,312
Totals	856,533	53.13%	683,981	42.28%	36,883	2.28%	20,787	1.28%	9,127	0.56%	7,459	0.46%	175,552	10.85%	1,617,770

== See also ==
- United States presidential elections in New York
- Presidency of Theodore Roosevelt
