= 1904 United States presidential election in Illinois =

- November 8, 1904
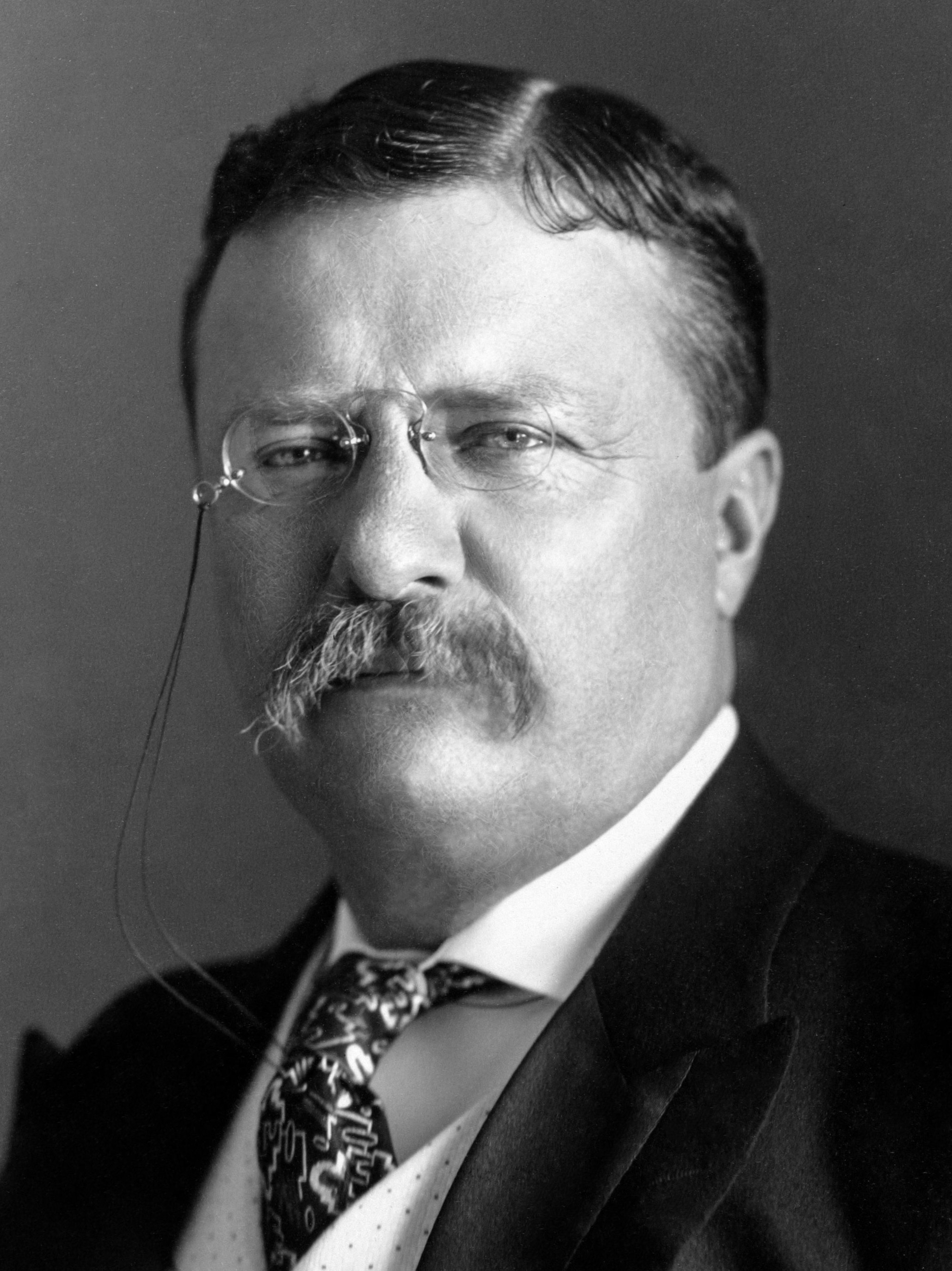

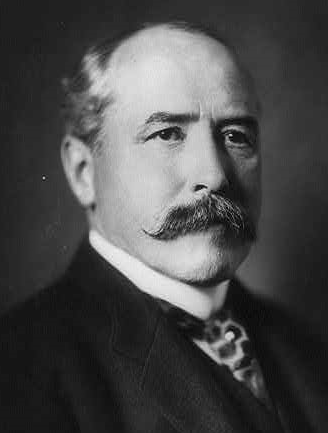

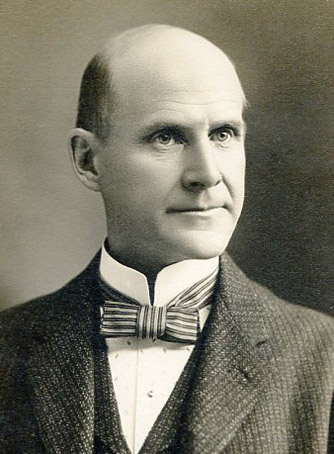
Nominee	Theodore Roosevelt	Alton B. Parker	Eugene V. Debs
Party	Republican	Democratic	Socialist
Home state	New York	New York	Indiana
Running mate	Charles W. Fairbanks	Henry G. Davis	Ben Hanford
Electoral vote	27	0	0
Popular vote	632,645	327,606	69,225
Percentage	58.77%	30.43%	6.43%
County results
Roosevelt
40–50%
50–60%
60–70%
70–80%
80–90%
Parker
40–50%
50–60%
President before election
Theodore Roosevelt
Republican
Elected President
Theodore Roosevelt
Republican

The 1904 United States presidential election in Illinois took place on November 8, 1904. All contemporary 45 states were part of the 1904 United States presidential election. State voters chose 27 electors to the Electoral College, which selected the president and vice president.

Illinois was won by the Republican nominees, incumbent President Theodore Roosevelt of New York and his running mate Charles W. Fairbanks of Indiana. They defeated the Democratic nominees, former Chief Judge of New York Court of Appeals Alton B. Parker and his running mate, former US Senator Henry G. Davis of West Virginia. Roosevelt won the state by a wide margin of 28.34%.

== Results ==
1904 United States presidential election in Illinois
Party	Candidate	Votes	Percentage	Electoral votes
Republican	Theodore Roosevelt (incumbent)	632,645	58.77%	27
Democratic	Alton B. Parker	327,606	30.43%	0
Social Democratic	Eugene V. Debs	69,225	6.43%	0
Prohibition	Silas C. Swallow	34,770	3.23%	0
Populist	Thomas E. Watson	6,725	0.62%	0
Socialist Labor	Charles Hunter Corregan	4,698	0.44%	0
Continental	Austin Holcomb	830	0.08%	0
Totals		1,076,499	100.00%	27
Voter turnout				—

=== Chicago results ===
1904 United States presidential election in Chicago
Party	Candidate	Votes	Percentage
Republican	Theodore Roosevelt	201,308	57.47%
Democratic	Alton B. Parker	97,722	27.90%
Social Democratic	Eugene V. Debs	41,537	11.86%
Prohibition	Silas C. Swallow	4,392	1.25%
Socialist Labor	Charles Hunter Corregan	2,789	0.80%
Populist	Thomas E. Watson	2,530	0.72%
Continental	Austin Holcomb	298	0.09%
Totals		350,306	100.00%

=== Results by county ===
County	Theodore Roosevelt Republican		Alton Brooks Parker Democratic		Eugene Victor Debs Social Democratic		Silas Comfort Swallow Prohibition		Various candidates Other parties		Margin		Total votes cast
County	#	%	#	%	#	%	#	%	#	%	#	%	Total votes cast
Adams	7,277	49.06%	6,149	41.45%	923	6.22%	402	2.71%	83	0.56%	1,128	7.60%	14,834
Alexander	3,203	63.11%	1,686	33.22%	103	2.03%	67	1.32%	16	0.32%	1,517	29.89%	5,075
Bond	2,055	55.86%	1,210	32.89%	70	1.90%	333	9.05%	11	0.30%	845	22.97%	3,679
Boone	3,036	84.69%	302	8.42%	109	3.04%	129	3.60%	9	0.25%	2,734	76.26%	3,585
Brown	934	38.09%	1,341	54.69%	21	0.86%	120	4.89%	36	1.47%	-407	-16.60%	2,452
Bureau	5,624	64.31%	1,917	21.92%	632	7.23%	482	5.51%	90	1.03%	3,707	42.39%	8,745
Calhoun	730	42.77%	815	47.74%	1	0.06%	154	9.02%	7	0.41%	-85	-4.98%	1,707
Carroll	3,128	76.44%	691	16.89%	97	2.37%	170	4.15%	6	0.15%	2,437	59.56%	4,092
Cass	1,827	46.80%	1,906	48.82%	12	0.31%	120	3.07%	39	1.00%	-79	-2.02%	3,904
Champaign	6,954	61.10%	3,754	32.98%	71	0.62%	545	4.79%	58	0.51%	3,200	28.11%	11,382
Christian	3,856	49.15%	3,297	42.02%	238	3.03%	406	5.17%	49	0.62%	559	7.12%	7,846
Clark	2,886	52.70%	2,271	41.47%	22	0.40%	258	4.71%	39	0.71%	615	11.23%	5,476
Clay	2,408	53.19%	1,935	42.74%	19	0.42%	119	2.63%	46	1.02%	473	10.45%	4,527
Clinton	1,848	43.02%	2,153	50.12%	165	3.84%	86	2.00%	44	1.02%	-305	-7.10%	4,296
Coles	4,901	55.52%	3,435	38.91%	169	1.91%	270	3.06%	53	0.60%	1,466	16.61%	8,828
Cook	229,848	58.49%	103,762	26.41%	47,743	12.15%	5,290	1.35%	6,302	1.60%	126,086	32.09%	392,945
Crawford	2,296	51.85%	1,850	41.78%	14	0.32%	245	5.53%	23	0.52%	446	10.07%	4,428
Cumberland	1,857	50.39%	1,644	44.61%	6	0.16%	157	4.26%	21	0.57%	213	5.78%	3,685
DeKalb	5,957	77.43%	1,137	14.78%	191	2.48%	355	4.61%	53	0.69%	4,820	62.65%	7,693
DeWitt	2,771	55.96%	1,872	37.80%	49	0.99%	228	4.60%	32	0.65%	899	18.15%	4,952
Douglas	2,518	54.80%	1,685	36.67%	19	0.41%	357	7.77%	16	0.35%	833	18.13%	4,595
DuPage	4,078	68.07%	1,407	23.49%	126	2.10%	352	5.88%	28	0.47%	2,671	44.58%	5,991
Edgar	3,753	50.33%	3,443	46.17%	42	0.56%	196	2.63%	23	0.31%	310	4.16%	7,457
Edwards	1,610	67.28%	595	24.86%	15	0.63%	170	7.10%	3	0.13%	1,015	42.42%	2,393
Effingham	1,863	42.68%	2,303	52.76%	30	0.69%	141	3.23%	28	0.64%	-440	-10.08%	4,365
Fayette	3,253	51.62%	2,650	42.05%	27	0.43%	313	4.97%	59	0.94%	603	9.57%	6,302
Ford	2,836	71.22%	926	23.25%	41	1.03%	164	4.12%	15	0.38%	1,910	47.97%	3,982
Franklin	2,077	50.04%	1,801	43.39%	38	0.92%	218	5.25%	17	0.41%	276	6.65%	4,151
Fulton	6,373	56.67%	3,791	33.71%	469	4.17%	496	4.41%	117	1.04%	2,582	22.96%	11,246
Gallatin	1,401	44.70%	1,540	49.14%	3	0.10%	170	5.42%	20	0.64%	-139	-4.44%	3,134
Greene	1,959	40.14%	2,649	54.28%	15	0.31%	229	4.69%	28	0.57%	-690	-14.14%	4,880
Grundy	3,448	69.73%	841	17.01%	384	7.77%	167	3.38%	105	2.12%	2,607	52.72%	4,945
Hamilton	1,894	45.65%	2,049	49.39%	28	0.67%	160	3.86%	18	0.43%	-155	-3.74%	4,149
Hancock	3,887	49.47%	3,456	43.98%	85	1.08%	393	5.00%	37	0.47%	431	5.48%	7,858
Hardin	756	49.09%	642	41.69%	7	0.45%	129	8.38%	6	0.39%	114	7.40%	1,540
Henderson	1,668	65.67%	708	27.87%	16	0.63%	139	5.47%	9	0.35%	960	37.80%	2,540
Henry	7,331	74.52%	1,390	14.13%	574	5.83%	429	4.36%	114	1.16%	5,941	60.39%	9,838
Iroquois	5,067	62.44%	2,376	29.28%	164	2.02%	457	5.63%	51	0.63%	2,691	33.16%	8,115
Jackson	3,984	56.30%	2,350	33.21%	246	3.48%	458	6.47%	38	0.54%	1,634	23.09%	7,076
Jasper	1,889	45.20%	2,024	48.43%	6	0.14%	230	5.50%	30	0.72%	-135	-3.23%	4,179
Jefferson	3,063	51.33%	2,462	41.26%	41	0.69%	286	4.79%	115	1.93%	601	10.07%	5,967
Jersey	1,531	45.30%	1,713	50.68%	5	0.15%	116	3.43%	15	0.44%	-182	-5.38%	3,380
Jo Daviess	3,388	63.11%	1,598	29.77%	171	3.19%	191	3.56%	20	0.37%	1,790	33.35%	5,368
Johnson	2,164	65.16%	980	29.51%	28	0.84%	112	3.37%	37	1.11%	1,184	35.65%	3,321
Kane	12,638	75.64%	2,799	16.75%	657	3.93%	511	3.06%	103	0.62%	9,839	58.89%	16,708
Kankakee	6,162	74.93%	1,652	20.09%	168	2.04%	216	2.63%	26	0.32%	4,510	54.84%	8,224
Kendall	2,120	78.84%	423	15.73%	12	0.45%	129	4.80%	5	0.19%	1,697	63.11%	2,689
Knox	7,566	73.84%	1,849	18.04%	411	4.01%	337	3.29%	84	0.82%	5,717	55.79%	10,247
Lake	11,967	62.67%	5,628	29.47%	940	4.92%	389	2.04%	171	0.90%	6,339	33.20%	19,095
LaSalle	6,635	77.11%	1,592	18.50%	132	1.53%	172	2.00%	74	0.86%	5,043	58.61%	8,605
Lawrence	1,969	50.64%	1,712	44.03%	4	0.10%	193	4.96%	10	0.26%	257	6.61%	3,888
Lee	4,634	69.77%	1,604	24.15%	76	1.14%	293	4.41%	35	0.53%	3,030	45.62%	6,642
Livingston	6,018	63.58%	2,785	29.42%	123	1.30%	497	5.25%	42	0.44%	3,233	34.16%	9,465
Logan	3,626	51.24%	3,005	42.47%	156	2.20%	243	3.43%	46	0.65%	621	8.78%	7,076
Macon	6,284	62.79%	2,952	29.50%	346	3.46%	371	3.71%	55	0.55%	3,332	33.29%	10,008
Macoupin	4,796	46.69%	4,336	42.21%	427	4.16%	468	4.56%	245	2.39%	460	4.48%	10,272
Madison	9,009	57.12%	5,429	34.42%	903	5.73%	306	1.94%	124	0.79%	3,580	22.70%	15,771
Marion	3,190	47.25%	2,490	36.88%	261	3.87%	522	7.73%	288	4.27%	700	10.37%	6,751
Marshall	2,190	55.97%	1,545	39.48%	82	2.10%	86	2.20%	10	0.26%	645	16.48%	3,913
Mason	1,798	45.04%	1,806	45.24%	60	1.50%	294	7.36%	34	0.85%	-8	-0.20%	3,992
Massac	2,078	74.72%	589	21.18%	1	0.04%	103	3.70%	10	0.36%	1,489	53.54%	2,781
McDonough	4,041	55.36%	2,730	37.40%	64	0.88%	426	5.84%	38	0.52%	1,311	17.96%	7,299
McHenry	5,409	77.21%	1,309	18.68%	41	0.59%	223	3.18%	24	0.34%	4,100	58.52%	7,006
McLean	8,772	58.66%	4,149	27.74%	846	5.66%	1,114	7.45%	74	0.49%	4,623	30.91%	14,955
Menard	1,705	49.46%	1,506	43.69%	16	0.46%	166	4.82%	54	1.57%	199	5.77%	3,447
Mercer	3,230	63.65%	1,386	27.31%	144	2.84%	249	4.91%	66	1.30%	1,844	36.33%	5,075
Monroe	1,622	52.32%	1,440	46.45%	2	0.06%	23	0.74%	13	0.42%	182	5.87%	3,100
Montgomery	3,489	47.98%	3,181	43.74%	194	2.67%	369	5.07%	39	0.54%	308	4.24%	7,272
Morgan	4,248	51.65%	3,343	40.64%	156	1.90%	385	4.68%	93	1.13%	905	11.00%	8,225
Moultrie	1,719	50.60%	1,470	43.27%	7	0.21%	176	5.18%	25	0.74%	249	7.33%	3,397
Ogle	5,109	75.14%	1,209	17.78%	45	0.66%	418	6.15%	18	0.26%	3,900	57.36%	6,799
Peoria	11,868	62.02%	5,697	29.77%	1,075	5.62%	303	1.58%	192	1.00%	6,171	32.25%	19,135
Perry	2,451	52.65%	1,466	31.49%	221	4.75%	416	8.94%	101	2.17%	985	21.16%	4,655
Piatt	2,515	63.24%	1,334	33.54%	10	0.25%	97	2.44%	21	0.53%	1,181	29.70%	3,977
Pike	3,007	44.42%	3,112	45.97%	185	2.73%	351	5.19%	114	1.68%	-105	-1.55%	6,769
Pope	1,744	68.58%	676	26.58%	2	0.08%	99	3.89%	22	0.87%	1,068	42.00%	2,543
Pulaski	2,180	70.71%	792	25.69%	10	0.32%	94	3.05%	7	0.23%	1,388	45.02%	3,083
Putnam	753	65.03%	355	30.66%	8	0.69%	37	3.20%	5	0.43%	398	34.37%	1,158
Randolph	3,238	52.17%	2,518	40.57%	122	1.97%	296	4.77%	33	0.53%	720	11.60%	6,207
Richland	1,778	48.20%	1,604	43.48%	67	1.82%	222	6.02%	18	0.49%	174	4.72%	3,689
Rock Island	8,152	61.74%	2,156	16.33%	2,422	18.34%	265	2.01%	208	1.58%	5,730 (Note: In this county where Parker ran third behind Debs, margin given is Roosevelt vote minus Debs vote and percentage margin Roosevelt percentage minus Debs percentage.)	43.40%	13,203
Saline	2,735	56.93%	1,758	36.59%	29	0.60%	231	4.81%	51	1.06%	977	20.34%	4,804
Sangamon	10,638	53.44%	7,571	38.03%	637	3.20%	818	4.11%	242	1.22%	3,067	15.41%	19,906
Schuyler	1,636	45.28%	1,682	46.55%	12	0.33%	262	7.25%	21	0.58%	-46	-1.27%	3,613
Scott	1,163	45.47%	1,236	48.32%	8	0.31%	110	4.30%	41	1.60%	-73	-2.85%	2,558
Shelby	3,220	46.53%	2,962	42.80%	39	0.56%	598	8.64%	101	1.46%	258	3.73%	6,920
St. Clair	11,926	55.31%	8,200	38.03%	788	3.65%	288	1.34%	359	1.67%	3,726	17.28%	21,561
Stark	1,764	71.27%	574	23.19%	27	1.09%	96	3.88%	14	0.57%	1,190	48.08%	2,475
Stephenson	4,876	56.63%	3,275	38.03%	193	2.24%	237	2.75%	30	0.35%	1,601	18.59%	8,611
Tazewell	4,051	52.41%	3,255	42.11%	108	1.40%	278	3.60%	37	0.48%	796	10.30%	7,729
Union	1,537	39.54%	1,967	50.60%	21	0.54%	345	8.88%	17	0.44%	-430	-11.06%	3,887
Vermilion	11,179	66.65%	3,620	21.58%	761	4.54%	1,122	6.69%	90	0.54%	7,559	45.07%	16,772
Wabash	1,298	44.57%	1,300	44.64%	16	0.55%	288	9.89%	10	0.34%	-2	-0.07%	2,912
Warren	3,563	61.35%	1,559	26.84%	316	5.44%	334	5.75%	36	0.62%	2,004	34.50%	5,808
Washington	2,374	57.30%	1,504	36.30%	116	2.80%	130	3.14%	19	0.46%	870	21.00%	4,143
Wayne	3,078	52.67%	2,416	41.34%	18	0.31%	288	4.93%	44	0.75%	662	11.33%	5,844
White	2,515	45.19%	2,774	49.84%	49	0.88%	215	3.86%	13	0.23%	-259	-4.65%	5,566
Whiteside	5,636	71.17%	1,546	19.52%	149	1.88%	532	6.72%	56	0.71%	4,090	51.65%	7,919
Will	10,001	66.39%	3,191	21.18%	1,199	7.96%	272	1.81%	402	2.67%	6,810	45.20%	15,065
Williamson	4,044	58.96%	1,996	29.10%	363	5.29%	396	5.77%	60	0.87%	2,048	29.86%	6,859
Winnebago	8,143	74.80%	1,177	10.81%	666	6.12%	825	7.58%	76	0.70%	6,966	63.98%	10,887
Woodford	2,371	51.19%	1,908	41.19%	79	1.71%	237	5.12%	37	0.80%	463	10.00%	4,632
Totals	632,645	58.87%	327,606	30.48%	69,225	6.44%	34,770	3.24%	10,437	0.97%	305,039	28.38%	1,074,683

== See also ==
- United States presidential elections in Illinois
