= Henry B. Metcalf =

American politician (1829–1904)

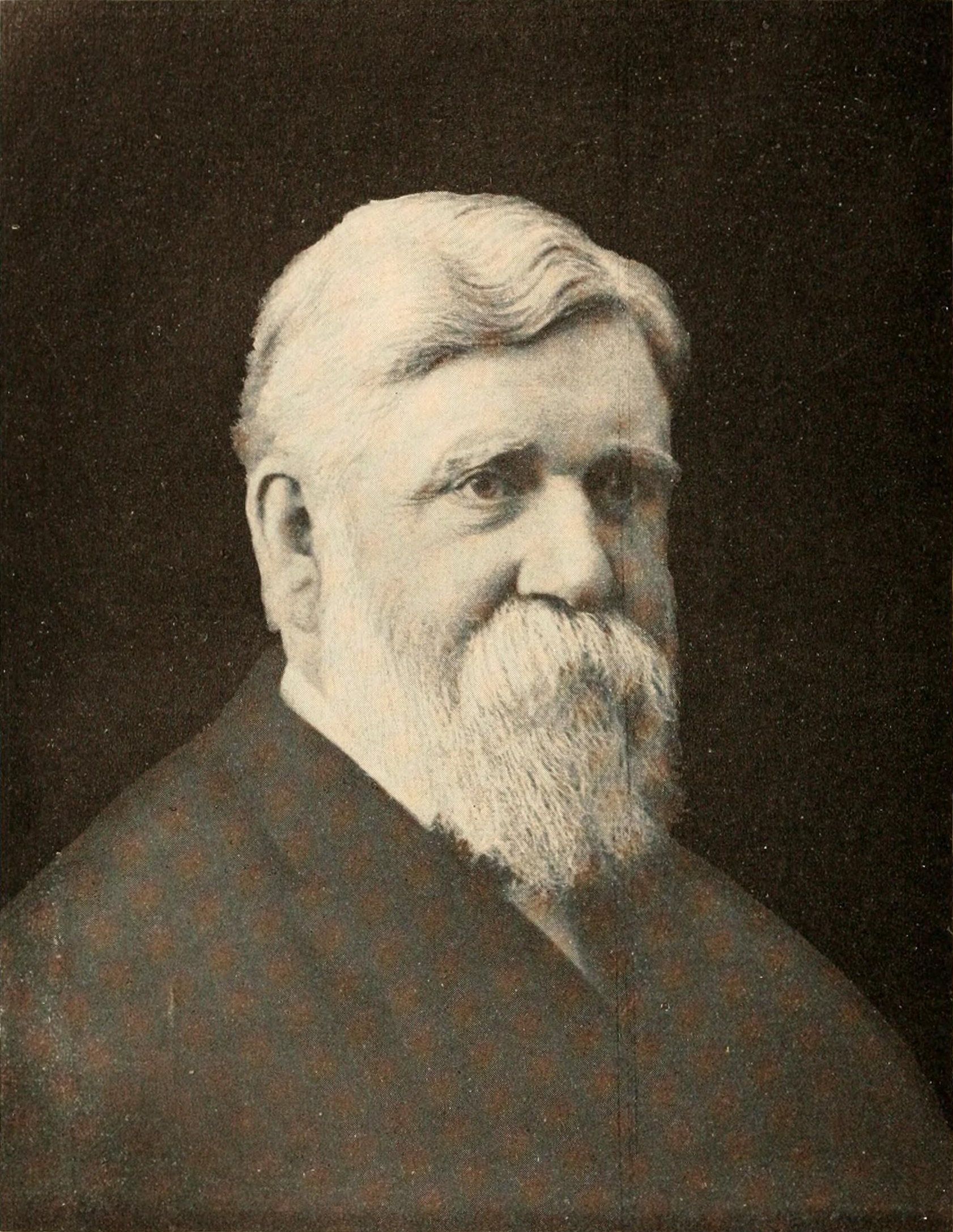

Member of the Rhode Island Senate
- In office 1885–1886

Personal details
- Born: Henry Brewer Metcalf; April 2, 1829 Boston, Massachusetts, U.S.
- Died: October 5, 1904 (aged 75) Pawtucket, Rhode Island, U.S.
- Party: Prohibition (1888–1904)
- Other political affiliations: Whig before (1856); Republican (Before 1888); Liberal Republican (1872)
- Education: Tufts University (MA)

Henry Brewer Metcalf (April 2, 1829 – October 5, 1904) was an American prohibitionist and politician from Rhode Island, who served as the Prohibition Party's gubernatorial candidate thrice and vice presidential nominee in 1900.

== Life ==
Henry Brewer Metcalf was born in Boston, Massachusetts on April 2, 1829, and attended public schools in the city. When he was 15 he was apprenticed to a dry goods importing and jobbing company in Boston to aid his family's finances. In 1856, he received a Master of Arts degree from Tufts College in Massachusetts. In 1867, he helped to form the Boston Button Company as the firm's senior partner and in 1874 he moved to Rhode Island where he established the Pawtucket Haircloth Company. He later formed the Campbell Machine Company in Boston which made machinery to make shoes. He later served as a Trustee of Tufts College and also as President of the Trustees of Tufts College.

He was a member of the Whig Party until its dissolution and then joined the Republican Party until 1872 when he joined the Liberal Republicans and supported Horace Greeley for president although he later returned following the party's dissolution. In 1874, he assisted in the reorganization of Pawtucket, Rhode Island's city government, being elected to the Winchester city council. In 1885, he was elected to Rhode Island's state senate and served for one term.

Despite his unsuccessful attempt at reelection to the state senate he was a leader in pushing for a constitutional amendment to ban the sale of liquor in Rhode Island and served as the president of the Rhode Island Temperence Union. In 1886, he joined the Prohibition Party and served as its gubernatorial candidate in 1893, 1894, and 1900.

In 1900, he served as a delegate to the Prohibition national convention and aided in the nomination of John G. Woolley for the party's presidential nomination. He won the Prohibition Party's vice presidential nomination with 349 delegates against Thomas R. Caskardon's 132 delegates and E. L. Eaton's 113 delegates.

Shortly before his death he was a member of the American Protective Tariff League of New York and vice president of the American Anti-Imperialist League. In 1904, he was selected to be the Prohibition Party's gubernatorial candidate again, but he died in Pawtucket, Rhode Island on October 5, 1904, after suffering a series of strokes at the age of 75 and was replaced by William E. Brightman.

== Electoral history ==
1893 Rhode Island gubernatorial election
Party	Candidate	Votes	%	±%
Republican	Daniel Russell Brown	21,830	46.40%	−3.82%
Democratic	David S. Baker	22,015	46.73%	+0.22%
Prohibition	Henry B. Metcalf	3,265	6.93%	+4.01%
Total votes		'47,110'	'100.00%'	

1894 Rhode Island gubernatorial election
Party	Candidate	Votes	%	±%
Republican	Daniel Russell Brown	29,157	53.15%	+6.75%
Democratic	David S. Baker	22,650	41.29%	−5.44%
Prohibition	Henry B. Metcalf	2,241	4.09%	−2.84%
Socialist Labor	Charles G. Baylor	592	1.08%	+1.08%
Populist	Henry A. Burlingame	223	0.41%	+0.41%
Total votes		'54,863'	'100.00%'	

1896 Rhode Island Second Congressional District election
Party	Candidate	Votes	%	±%
Republican	Adin B. Capron	16,612	63.50%	+2.91%
Democratic	Lucius F. C. Garvin	8,088	30.92%	−3.34%
Prohibition	Henry B. Metcalf	1,207	4.61%	+0.75%
Socialist Labor	James Jefferson	254	0.97%	+0.12%
Total votes		'26,161'	'100.00%'	

1900 Rhode Island gubernatorial election
Party	Candidate	Votes	%	±%
Republican	William Gregory	26,043	54.33%	−2.03%
Democratic	Nathan W. Littlefield	17,184	35.85%	+1.99%
Socialist Labor	James P. Reid	2,858	5.96%	−0.86%
Prohibition	Henry B. Metcalf	1,848	3.86%	+0.89%
Total votes		'47,933'	'100.00%'	

1900 United States presidential and vice-presidential election
Party	Candidate	Votes	%	±%
Republican	William McKinley (incumbent) & Theodore Roosevelt	7,218,283	51.66%	
Democratic	William Jennings Bryan & Adlai Stevenson	6,358,149	45.51%	
Prohibition	John G. Woolley & Henry B. Metcalf	209,132	1.50%	
Social Democratic	Eugene V. Debs & Job Harriman	86,973	0.62%	
Populist	Wharton Barker & Ignatius Donnelly	50,892	0.36%	
Socialist Labor	Joseph F. Malloney & Valentine Remmel	40,968	0.29%	
Union Reform Party (1900)	Seth H. Ellis & Samuel T. Nicholson	5,696	0.04%	
United Christian Party (United States)	Jonah Leonard & David H. Martin	518	0.00%	
write-ins	others	1,236	0.01%	
Total votes		13,971,846	100.00%	

Party political offices
Preceded by Hale Johnson; James H. Southgate	Prohibition nominee for Vice President of the United States; 1900	Succeeded by George Carroll
