= George Washington Carroll =

American politician

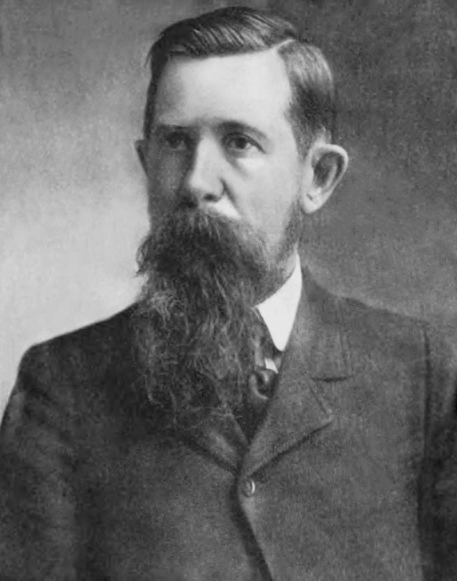

Personal details
- Born: April 11, 1855 Mansfield, Louisiana, U.S.
- Died: December 14, 1935 (aged 80) Beaumont, Texas, U.S.
- Party: Prohibition
- Spouse: Underhill Mixson
- Children: 3
- Parents: Francis Lafayette Carroll (father); Sarah Long (mother)

George Washington Carroll (April 11, 1855 – December 14, 1935) was an American politician and businessman. During the 1904 presidential election, he was given the vice presidential nomination of the Prohibition Party and ran alongside Silas C. Swallow.

== Life ==
George Washington Carroll was born on April 11, 1855, to Francis Lafayette Carroll and Sarah Long in Mansfield, Louisiana. In 1868, his family moved to Beaumont, Texas where his father created the Long Shingle and Saw Mill and later moved to Waco, Texas in 1887. On November 20, 1877, he married Underhill Mixson, which was the first church wedding conducted in Beaumont, and later had three children with her.

He worked as a foreman at his father's company and in 1877, his father, John Gilbert, and him created the Beaumont Lumber Company and by 1892 he had risen to become president and general manager of the company. In 1900, they sold the company to John Henry Kirby. In 1892, he invested $1,000 into Pattillo Higgins's Gladys City Oil Company and was elected as its president due to him being the only investor to give capital instead of land. Carroll became rich after the company discovered oil at Spindletop. In 1901, he and his father both gave Baylor University $75,000.

On December 14, 1935, Carroll died from pneumonia in a YMCA building in Beaumont that he had helped to create in the 1920s.

Party political offices
| Preceded by Henry B. Metcalf | Prohibition nominee for Vice President of the United States; 1904 | Succeeded by Aaron S. Watkins |
