= Hale Johnson =

American politician

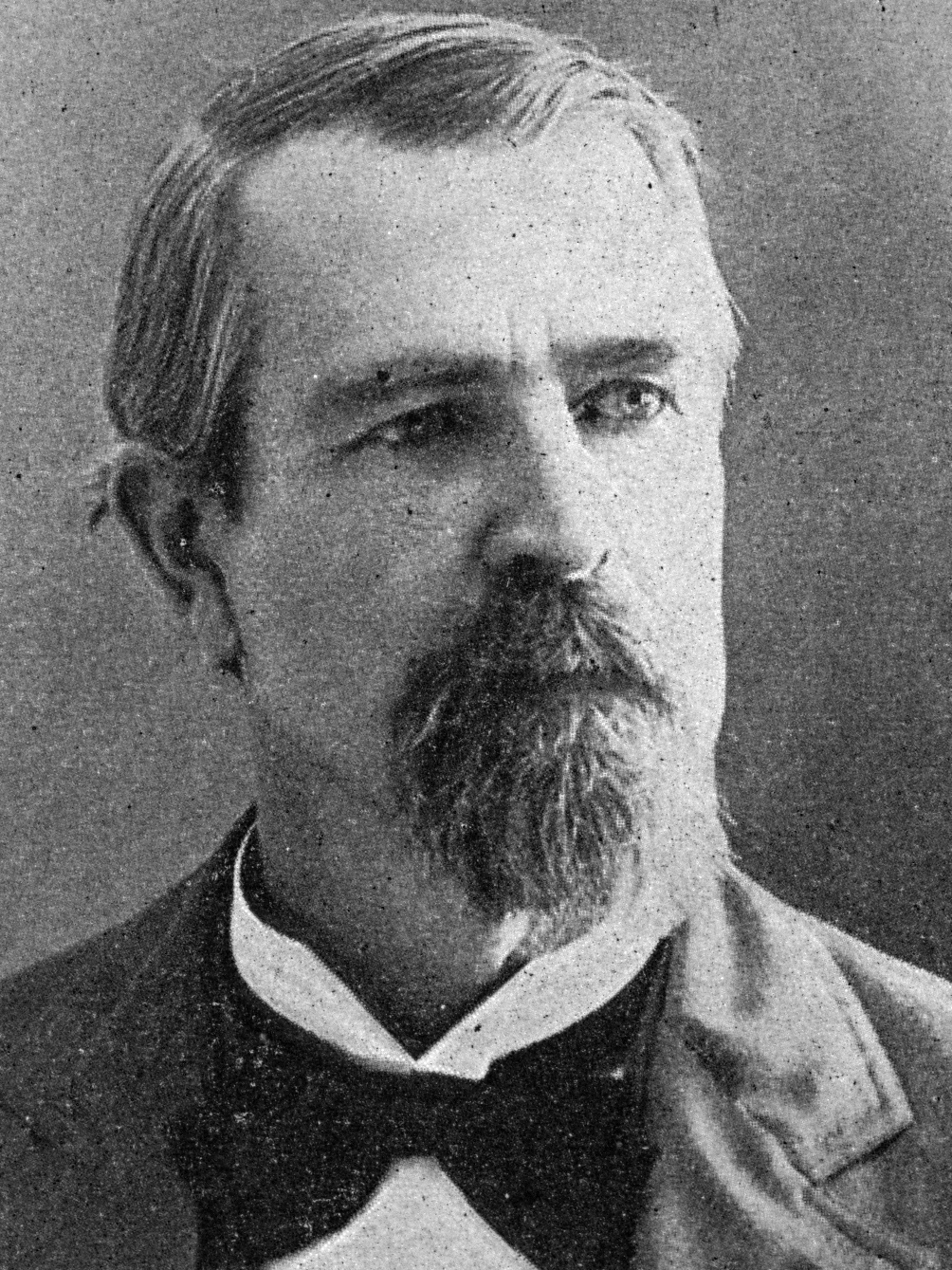

Personal details
- Born: August 21, 1847 Montgomery County, Indiana, U.S.
- Died: November 4, 1902 (aged 55) Bogota, Illinois, U.S.
- Resting place: Riverside City Cemetery, Newton, Illinois, U.S.
- Party: Prohibition
- Other political affiliations: Republican (Before 1882)
- Spouse: Mary E. Loofburrow
- Children: 6
- Parents: John B. Johnson (father); Sarah Ann Davisson (mother)

Military service
- Allegiance: United States of America
- Branch/service: Union Army
- Years of service: 1864-1865
- Unit: 135th Indiana Infantry Regiment
- Battles/wars: American Civil War

Hale Johnson (August 21, 1847 – November 4, 1902) was an American attorney and politician who served as the Prohibition Party's vice presidential nominee in 1896 and ran for its presidential nomination in 1900.

== Life ==
Hale Johnson was born on August 21, 1847, in Montgomery County, Indiana to John B. Johnson and Sarah Ann Davisson and named after the abolitionist Senator John P. Hale. During the Civil War his father served as assistant surgeon while he enlisted into Company D, 135th Indiana Infantry at the age of 17. At the end of the Civil War, his family moved to Illinois.

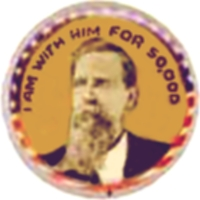
Hale Johnson campaign button

He was a lawyer and became mayor of Newton, Illinois. In 1882, Johnson left the Republican Party after supporting every Republican presidential candidate from 1868 to 1880 because it did not support a constitutional amendment for national alcohol prohibition. In 1884, Johnson was the Prohibition Party's candidate for Illinois Attorney General. In 1892, he was elected as the Prohibition Party's national chairman and served in that position until 1896. In 1896, he was the Prohibition Party candidate for governor of Illinois, but later that year he was nominated party's candidate for vice president in the 1896 presidential election and campaigned in over 30 states. He was a narrow gauger who supported a platform with one plank for prohibition unlike the broad gaugers who supported free silver and women's suffrage being added to the platform.

During the 1900 presidential election he ran for the Prohibition Party's presidential nomination, but withdrew shortly before balloting and supported John G. Woolley who was able to narrowly defeat Silas C. Swallow for the nomination with 380 delegates to 320 on June 28, 1900.

Johnson was shot to death by a farmer, Harry Harris, in Bogota, Illinois, on November 4, 1902, while trying to collect a debt that Harris had refused to pay even after being ordered to by a court. Johnson was with a local sheriff when he was shot in the face by a shotgun and killed instantly; Harris was grabbed by the sheriff, but not before he swallowed a fatal dose of poison which he died from hours later. Johnson was interred in the Riverside City Cemetery in Newton, Illinois. In 1903, a monument of Johnson was created in Newton with former Prohibition presidential candidate John G. Woolley, former Representative George W. Fithian and national Prohibition chairman Oliver W. Stewart were at the ceremony.

Party political offices
Preceded by James B. Cranfill	Prohibition nominee for Vice President of the United States; 1896; Served alongside: James H. Southgate	Succeeded by Henry B. Metcalf
