= Charles Hunter Corregan =

American printer and politician

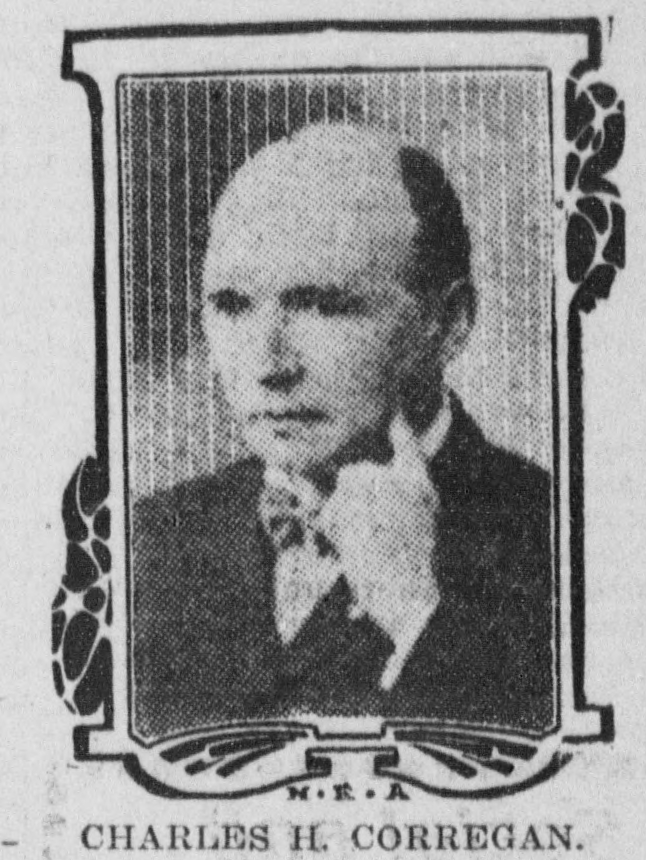
Corregan in 1904

Charles Hunter Corregan (December 11, 1860 – June 1946) was an American printer and politician.

== Life ==
Corregan was born in Oswego, New York, on December 11, 1860.

In 1898, he ran for New York Attorney General on the Socialist Labor ticket, but was defeated. In 1900 and 1928, he ran for Governor of New York on the Socialist Labor ticket, but was defeated. He was nominated for U.S. President in 1904 by the Socialist Labor Party of America.
