= Silas C. Swallow =

American politician (1839–1930)

Silas Swallow
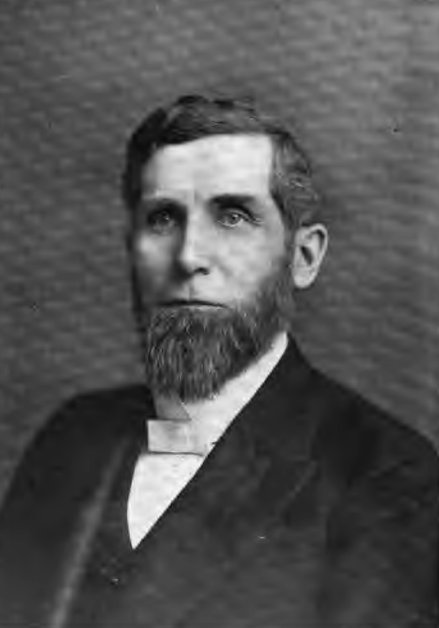
- Swallow in 1904

Personal details
- Born: Silas Comfort Swallow; March 5, 1839 Wilkes-Barre, Pennsylvania, U.S.
- Died: August 13, 1930 (aged 91) Harrisburg, Pennsylvania, U.S.
- Party: Prohibition
- Spouse: Rebecca Louise Robins
- Parents: George Swallow (father); Sarah Thompson (mother)
- Education: Wyoming Seminary; Taylor University

Military service
- Allegiance: United States of America
- Branch/service: Union Army
- Rank: First lieutenant
- Unit: 18th Pennsylvania Volunteer Infantry Regiment
- Battles/wars: American Civil War

Silas Comfort Swallow (March 5, 1839 – August 13, 1930) was a United States Methodist preacher and prohibitionist politician who was an opponent of slavery. He was the Prohibitionist presidential nominee in 1904.

== Early life ==
On March 5, 1839, Silas Comfort Swallow was born in Wilkes-Barre, Pennsylvania, to George Swallow, a trustee of Wyoming Seminary, and Sarah Thompson. He was named after Methodist preacher Silas Comfort (1803–1868), an anti-slavery member of the Genesee, Oneida and Missouri Conferences.

While serving in St. Louis, Missouri, Swallow admitted as evidence in a church trial the testimony of a Negro, a practice which was forbidden in public trials in Missouri at the time. He was censured by his Conference, but that censure was overturned by the 1840 General Conference. The General Conference then bowed to Southern pressure and passed a resolution prohibiting the testimony of Negroes in church trials within states that forbade such testimony in public trials. That resolution was rescinded in 1844. Before entering the ministry, Silas was employed as a school teacher from the age of 16 to 21 and later studied law.

== Career ==
In 1862, he enlisted into the Union Army and served as a First lieutenant in the 18th Pennsylvania Volunteer Infantry Regiment during the American Civil War.

He entered the Baltimore Conference in 1863 and became a charter member of the Central Pennsylvania Conference upon its organization in 1869. On January 20, 1866, he married Rebecca Louise Robins. He worked a church builder, presiding elder, and editor of The Central Pennsylvania Methodist. As editor he attacked alcohol, spiritual indifference, and political corruption in the state government that led to him being prosecuted and convicted of slander and fined $500 (~$19,350 in 2025) in 1897, but the verdict was later reversed by the State Superior Court. In 1901 he was criticized for an editorial critical of William McKinley that was released shortly after his death.

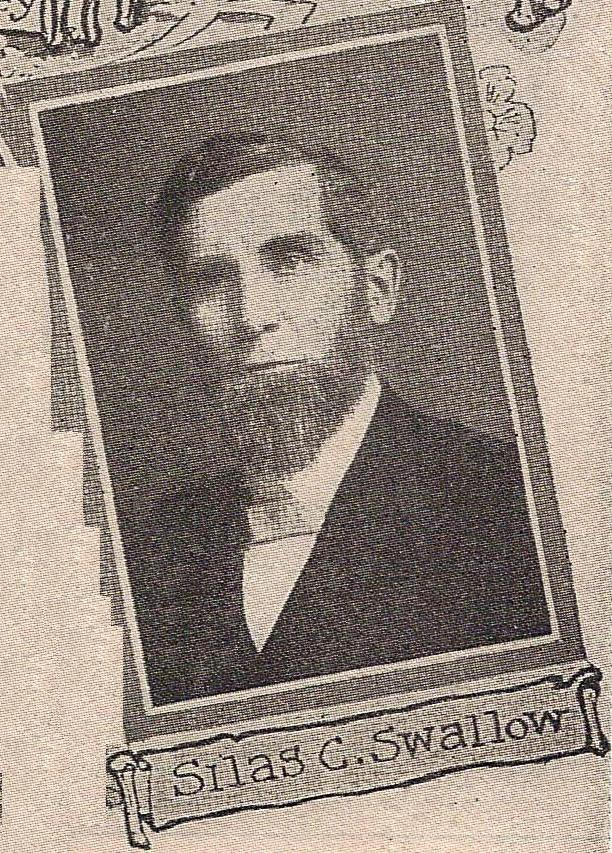
Silas Comfort Swallow

=== Politics ===
He was the Prohibition Party's candidate for Mayor of Harrisburg, state legislature, State Treasurer, and Governor of Pennsylvania. When he ran for governor of Pennsylvania in 1898 he received the nomination of the Prohibition, People's, Liberty, and Honest Government parties and received 13% in the general election. In 1901, he received a single vote for Senator from state representative L. D. Brown.

During the 1900 presidential election he ran for the Prohibition Party's presidential nomination, but was narrowly defeated by John G. Woolley after Hale Johnson withdrew before balloting and endorsed Woolley. During the 1904 presidential election it was initially believed that General Nelson A. Miles would be the Prohibition Party's presidential nominee, but one hour before the convention was to vote he sent a telegram refusing to allow the delegates to vote for him. Swallow, who was supposed to serve as an at-large delegate for Pennsylvania, but was unable to attend due to his wife's poor health, was voted on instead and given the nomination by acclamation. It was speculated that he might not accept the nomination, but after his wife's health improved he accepted it and appeared on the ticket with his running mate George Washington Carroll. In the general election he received 259,102 votes which is the second highest popular vote total for the party.

== Death ==
Swallow died at his home in Harrisburg, Pennsylvania on August 13, 1930, from old age and was interred at Paxtang Cemetery near Harrisburg.

== Church service ==
Dr. Swallow's official conference service record lists the following appointments:

- 1863–1864 Milton circuit.
- 1864–1866 Berwick.
- 1866–1868 Catawissa.
- 1868–1871 Newberry.
- 1871–1873 Williamsport Third Street.
- 1873–1875 Milton.
- 1875–1877 Altoona Eighth Avenue.
- 1877–1881 presiding elder, Altoona District.
- 1881–1884 York First.
- 1884–1886 Williamsport Grace.
- 1886–1887 agent, Dickinson College.
- 1887–1892 Harrisburg Ridge Avenue.
- 1892–1902 superintendent, Harrisburg Methodist book room.
- 1902–1908 no appointment, by request.
- 1908–1930 retired.

== Writings ==
Being an editor, Swallow made certain that his life story was recorded for posterity. Upon reaching his 70th birthday in 1909, he published a 482-page hardback autobiography: III Score and X – Selections, Collections, Recollections of Seventy Busy Years.

This proved to be so successful that he came out with periodic updates as follows:

- Toasts and Roasts of III Score and X, 1911.
- Then and Now – Some Reminiscences of an Octogenarian, 1919.
- IV Score and More, 1922.

Other booklets and pamphlets by Swallow, all of which are preserved in the archives of the Central Pennsylvania Conference of the United Methodist Church, range in date and content from his 1879 Camp Meetings and the Sabbath to his 1917 A Sermon on Thanksgiving and Thanksliving.

== Electoral history ==
1898 Pennsylvania gubernatorial election
Party	Candidate	Votes	%	±%
Republican	William A. Stone	476,206	49.01%	−11.30%
Democratic	George A. Jenks	358,300	36.87%	+1.89%
Prohibition	Silas C. Swallow	132,931	13.68%	+11.22%
Socialist Labor	J. Mahlon Barnes	4,273	0.44%	+0.26%
Write-in		32	0.00%	–0.02%
Total votes		971,742	100.00%	

1902 Pennsylvania gubernatorial election
Party	Candidate	Votes	%	±%
Republican	Samuel W. Pennypacker	593,328	54.20%	+5.19%
Democratic	Robert E. Pattison	450,978	41.19%	+4.32%
Prohibition	Silas C. Swallow	23,327	2.13%	−11.55%
Socialist	John W. Slayton	21,910	2.00%	+2.00%
Socialist Labor	William Adams	5,155	0.47%	+0.03%
Write-in		73	0.01%	+0.01%
Total votes		1,094,771	100.00%	

Party political offices
Preceded by John G. Woolley	Prohibition nominee for President of the United States; 1904	Succeeded by Eugene W. Chafin
