= Wharton Barker =

American financier and publicist (1846-1921)

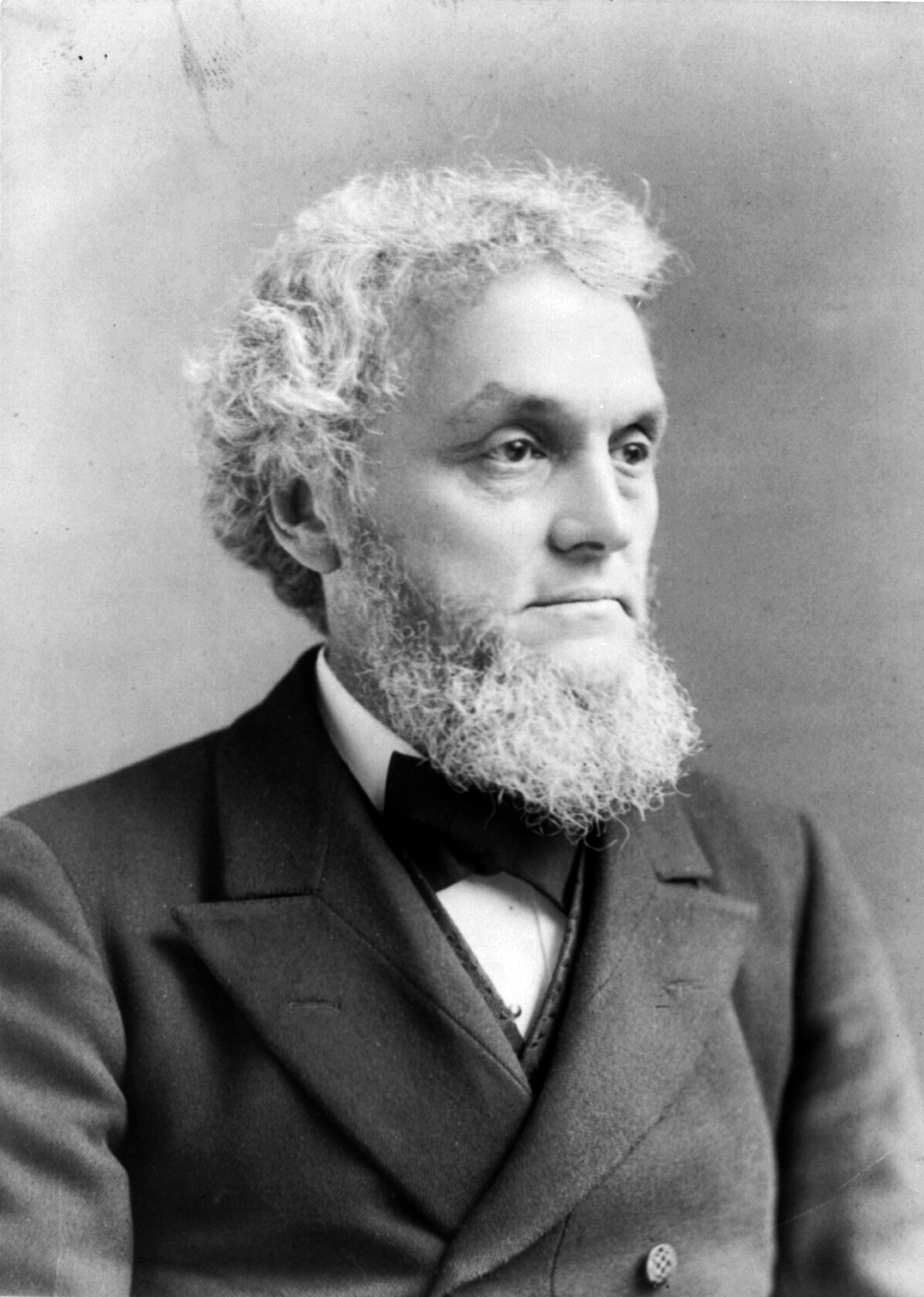

Personal details
- Born: May 1, 1846 Philadelphia, Pennsylvania, U.S.
- Died: April 9, 1921 (aged 74) Philadelphia, Pennsylvania, U.S.
- Resting place: Laurel Hill Cemetery, Philadelphia, Pennsylvania
- Party: Republican
- Other political affiliations: Populist; Silver Republican
- Spouse: Margaret Corlies
- Parents: Abraham Barker (father); Sarah Wharton (mother)
- Relatives: Jacob Barker (grandfather)
- Education: University of Pennsylvania
- Awards: Order of Saint Stanislaus

Military service
- Years of service: 1861-1865
- Unit: United States Army (Union Army)
- Battles/wars: American Civil War

Wharton Barker (May 1, 1846 – April 9, 1921) was an American financier and publicist who held influence in the Republican presidential selection during the 1880s and was a rival Populist presidential candidate in 1900.

== Life ==
Wharton Barker was born on May 1, 1846, to Abraham Barker and Sarah Wharton in Philadelphia, Pennsylvania. In 1867, he married Margaret Corlies and later had three children with her.

He graduated from the University of Pennsylvania in 1866, but prior to this time had organized and commanded a company in the American Civil War. As a member of the banking firm of Barker Bros. & Co., he was appointed in 1878 as special financial agent of the Russian government. During the Russo-Turkish War, he helped the Russian Empire obtain warships, and for it was given the Order of Saint Stanislaus. He became an acquaintance of Tsar Alexander II of Russia who helped him in the development of mining lands throughout Russia and Europe. He also obtained valuable railroad, telegraph, and telephone concessions that were later withdrawn from China. As early as 1869, he founded the Penn Monthly, a weekly devoted to political, economic, and social questions, which in 1880-1900 was published under the name The American.

At the 1880 Republican National Convention, he opposed Ulysses S. Grant's attempt to gain a third term and helped Representative James A. Garfield win the Republican nomination. After winning the presidency, Garfield offered Barker the position of Secretary of the Interior, but he declined. At the 1888 convention, he supported former Senator Benjamin Harrison. During the 1896 presidential election he left the Republican Party and joined the Populist Party due to his support of the free silver movement and supported William Jennings Bryan. During the 1900 presidential election Populists opposed to William Jennings Bryan met in Cincinnati, Ohio to nominate an independent ticket rather than fuse with Bryan and narrowly selected Barker with 370 delegates for him to 336 delegates for Milford W. Howard. During the 1912 presidential election the Republican Party was divided over William Howard Taft and Theodore Roosevelt's presidential campaigns, but Barker opposed both of them and supported Senator Albert B. Cummins for the Republican nomination, but after Cummins lost the nomination Barker switched his support to Roosevelt and his Progressive Party.

In 1884, he was elected as a member of the American Philosophical Society.

On April 9, 1921, Barker died at age 74 in Philadelphia after suffering from an illness for one month. He was interred at Laurel Hill Cemetery in Philadelphia.

Party political offices
Preceded by William Jennings Bryan	Populist Party Presidential candidate 1900	Succeeded by Thomas E. Watson
