= John G. Woolley =

American lawyer

John Woolley

Personal details
- Born: John Granville Woolley; February 15, 1850 Collinsville, Ohio, U.S.
- Died: August 13, 1922 (aged 72) Granada, Spain
- Party: Prohibition
- Other political affiliations: Republican
- Spouse: Mary Veronica Gerhardt
- Parents: Edwin C. Woolley (father); Elizabeth Hunter Woolley (mother)
- Education: Ohio Wesleyan University (BA); University of Michigan

John Granville Woolley (February 15, 1850 – August 13, 1922) was an American politician, lawyer, and public speaker who served as the Prohibition Party's presidential candidate in 1900.

== Biography ==
John Granville Woolley was born in Collinsville, Ohio, on February 15, 1850, to Edwin C. Woolley and Elizabeth Hunter Woolley. In 1871, he graduated from Ohio Wesleyan University and, in 1873 from the University of Michigan Law School, before gaining admission to the Illinois bar. He was elected City Attorney in Paris, Illinois, in 1875 and became Prosecuting Attorney of Minneapolis, Minnesota, in 1881. Two years after entering private practice in New York in 1886, Woolley, a reformed alcoholic, began a career of public speaking around the country. On January 31, 1888, he joined the Prohibition Party in New York City and later that year Clinton B. Fisk offered him a job to practice corporate law, but he rejected the offer.

During the 1896 presidential election there were attempts to draft him for the Prohibition presidential nomination, but he chose not to run. During the 1900 presidential election he ran for the Prohibition Party's presidential nomination and with the support of Hale Johnson, the party's 1896 vice presidential nominee who withdrew shortly before balloting, was able to narrowly defeat Silas C. Swallow for the nomination with 380 delegates to 320 on June 28, 1900. Woolley, along with Henry B. Metcalf as vice-presidential candidate, placed third in the national popular vote with over 209,000 votes (about 1.5% of the total). In 1903, he received a single vote for Illinois's senate seat.

In the 1900s he was successively editor and part-owner of The Lever in Chicago and of the journal into which it merged, The New Voice, national organ of the Prohibition Party, founded in 1899. Woolley made two tours of Europe in 1901 and 1905 to speak for Prohibition. On January 4, 1913, he announced that he was leaving the Prohibition Party due to its vote totals continuing to decrease with every presidential election.

In 1922, he was commissioned by the World League Against Alcoholism to study prohibition in several countries, but died from a heart attack in Granada, Spain, on August 13, 1922.

== Works ==
- Seed
- The Sower
- Civilization by Faith
- The Christian Citizen (1897–1898)
- The Lion Hunter (1900)
- Temperance Progress in the Nineteenth Century (1902)
- Civic Sermons
- South Sea Letters (1905)

Party political offices
Preceded by Charles Bentley; Joshua Levering	Prohibition nominee for President of the United States; 1900	Succeeded by Silas C. Swallow
