= Seth H. Ellis =

American politician

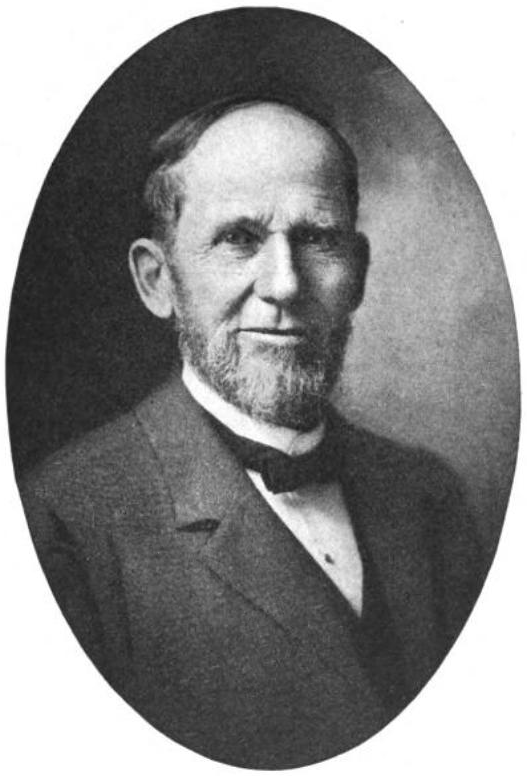
- Born: Seth Hockett Ellis; January 3, 1830; Martinsville, Ohio
- Died: June 23, 1904 (aged 74); Waynesville, Ohio
- Occupation: Politician
- Political party: Republican; Prohibition; Union Reform
- Spouse: Rebecca Jane Tressler (m. 1851)

Seth Hockett Ellis (January 3, 1830 – June 23, 1904) was an American politician and reformer who served many years on the Ohio Board of Agriculture. Ellis was also interested in co-operative manufacturing of farm implements.

== Biography ==
Ellis was born on a farm near Martinsville, Ohio. He married Rebecca Jane Tressler on August 21, 1851, in Warren County, Ohio.

In 1873, he was elected first Master of the Ohio State Grange, of which he was a founder.

Ellis began his political career as a Republican. After losing a nomination for office in a local Republican convention, Ellis ran as the Prohibition Party nominee for Lt. Governor of Ohio in 1893, US House in 1894, and Ohio Governor in 1895.

Ellis was the leader of the Union Reform Party, which sought to collect all the various reform movements into one national party. The movement was widely ridiculed in the press. He was the party's nominee for Governor of Ohio in 1899 and the party's nominee for President in 1900. In the latter race, 80% of Ellis's votes came from his home state of Ohio.

Ellis was a birthright Quaker, but left the society as a young man and joined the Methodist Episcopal Church. He later rejoined the Quakers and served as one of the two presiding officers of the 1903 centennial of Quakers in Waynesville, Ohio.

Ellis died on June 23, 1904 when he fell from a cherry tree on his farm in Waynesville.

== Bibliography ==
- Ohio Agricultural Experiment Station (1904). Twenty-third Annual Report [...]. Wooster, OH: Experiment Station Press.
- Ellis, Dora. "Ellis, Seth Hotchett". In Bailey, L. H. (ed.). Cyclopedia of American Agriculture. London: MacMillan Company. pp. 568–69.
