= 1900 United States presidential election in Connecticut =

- November 6, 1900
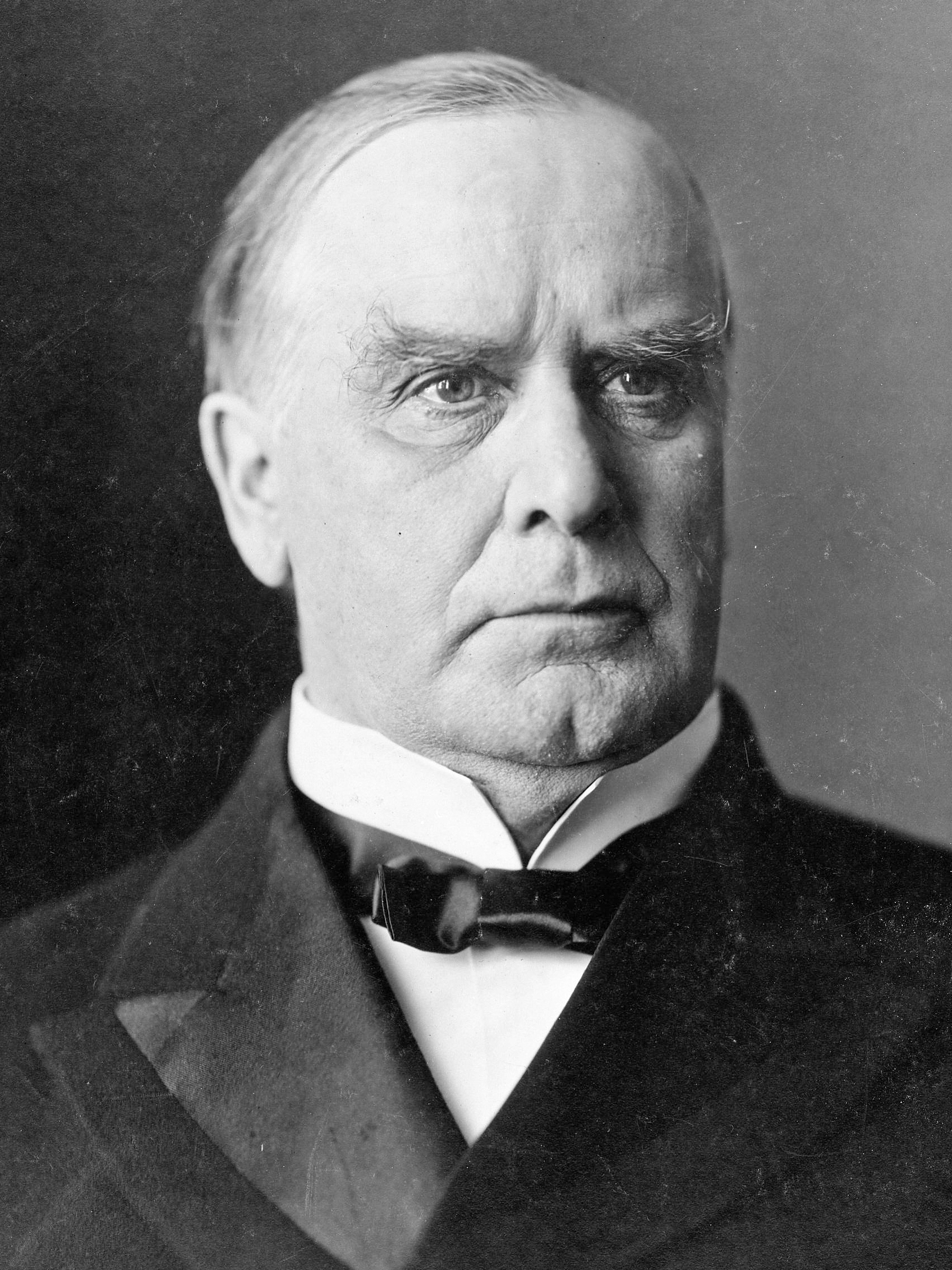

Nominee	William McKinley	William Jennings Bryan
Party	Republican	Democratic
Home state	Ohio	Nebraska
Running mate	Theodore Roosevelt	Adlai Stevenson I
Electoral vote	6	0
Popular vote	102,572	74,014
Percentage	56.92%	41.07%

McKinley
40–50%
50–60%
60–70%
70–80%
80–90%
Bryan
40–50%
50–60%
60–70%
President before election
William McKinley
Republican
Elected President
William McKinley
Republican

The 1900 United States presidential election in Connecticut took place on November 6, 1900, as part of the 1900 United States presidential election. Voters chose six representatives, or electors to the Electoral College, who voted for president and vice president.

Connecticut overwhelmingly voted for the Republican nominee, President William McKinley, over the Democratic nominee, former U.S. Representative and 1896 Democratic presidential nominee William Jennings Bryan. McKinley won Connecticut by a margin of 15.85% in this rematch of the 1896 presidential election. The return of economic prosperity and recent victory in the Spanish–American War helped McKinley to score a decisive victory.

Bryan had previously lost Connecticut to McKinley four years earlier and would later lose the state again in 1908 to William Howard Taft.

== Results ==
1900 United States presidential election in Connecticut
Party	Candidate	Running mate	Popular vote		Electoral vote	
Party	Candidate	Running mate	Count	%	Count	%
Republican	William McKinley of Ohio (incumbent)	Theodore Roosevelt of New York	102,572	56.92%	6	100.00%
Democratic	William Jennings Bryan of Nebraska	Adlai Ewing Stevenson I of Illinois	74,014	41.07%	0	0.00%
Prohibition	John Granville Woolley of Illinois	Henry Brewer Metcalf of Rhode Island	1,617	0.90%	0	0.00%
Socialist	Eugene Victor Debs of Indiana	Job Harriman of California	1,029	0.57%	0	0.00%
Socialist Labor	Joseph Francis Malloney of Massachusetts	Valentine Remmel of Pennsylvania	908	0.50%	0	0.00%
N/A	Others	Others	55	0.03%	0	0.00%
Total			180,195	100.00%	6	100.00%

== See also ==
- United States presidential elections in Connecticut
