= 1900 United States presidential election in Massachusetts =

- November 6, 1900
- Turnout: 67.4 ▼3.2 pp
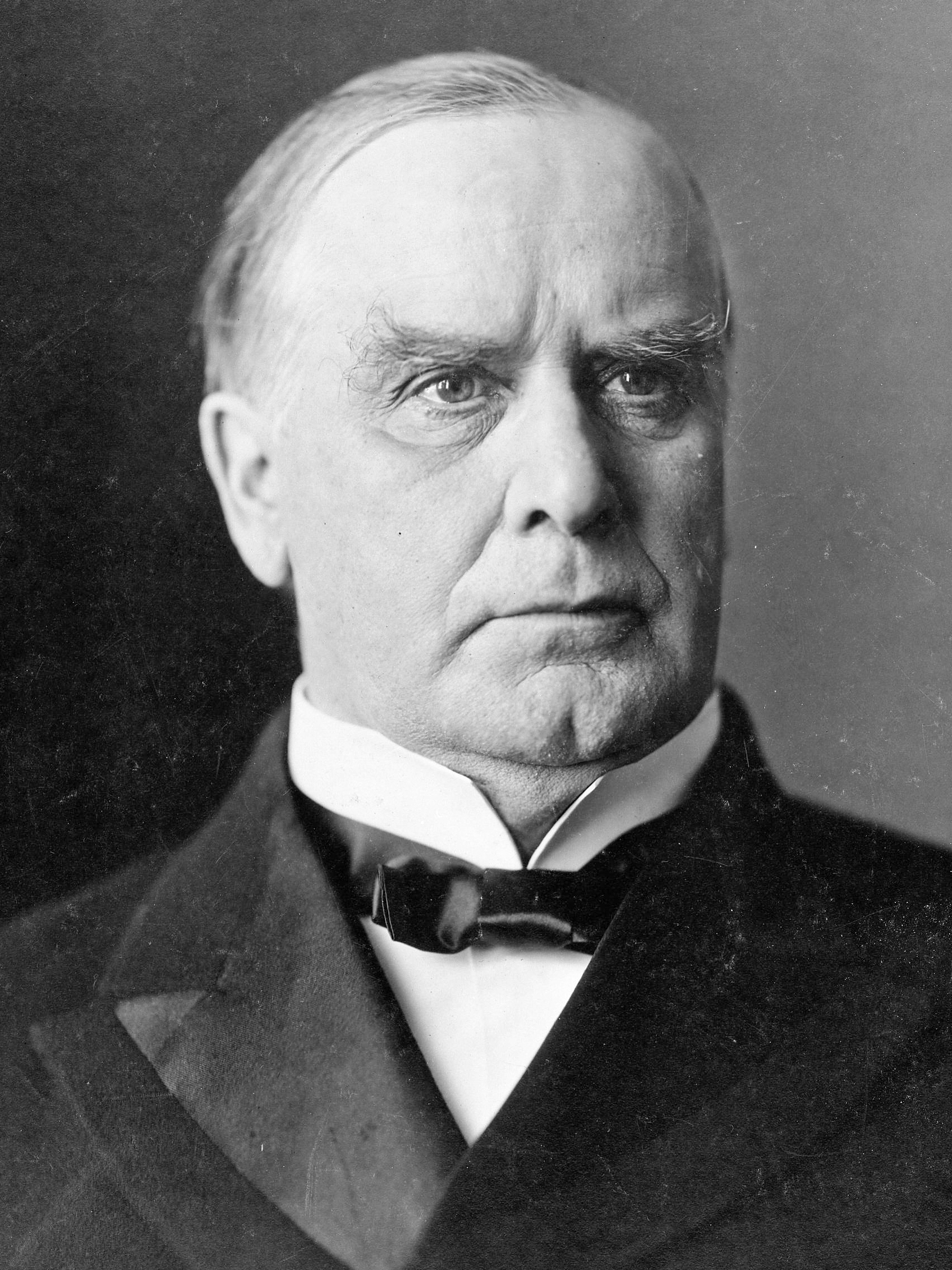

Nominee	William McKinley	William Jennings Bryan
Party	Republican	Democratic
Home state	Ohio	Nebraska
Running mate	Theodore Roosevelt	Adlai E. Stevenson
Electoral vote	15	0
Popular vote	238,866	156,997
Percentage	57.59%	37.85%

McKinley
40–50%
50–60%
60–70%
70–80%
80–90%
90–100%
Bryan
40–50%
50–60%
60–70%
President before election
William McKinley
Republican
Elected President
William McKinley
Republican

The 1900 United States presidential election in Massachusetts took place on November 6, 1900, as part of the 1900 United States presidential election. Voters chose 15 representatives, or electors to the Electoral College, who voted for president and vice president.

Massachusetts overwhelmingly voted for the Republican nominee, President William McKinley, over the Democratic nominee, former U.S. Representative and 1896 Democratic presidential nominee William Jennings Bryan. McKinley won Massachusetts by a margin of 19.74% in this rematch of the 1896 presidential election. The return of economic prosperity and recent victory in the Spanish–American War helped McKinley to score a decisive victory.

McKinley was able to win 13 out of the 14 counties in the state of Massachusetts. The only county that went to Bryan was Suffolk County, home to the state's capital and largest city, Boston. Bryan had previously lost the county to McKinley in 1896 and would lose it again to William Howard Taft in 1908. Bryan had previously lost Massachusetts to McKinley four years earlier and would later lose the state again to Taft in 1908.

== Results ==
1900 United States presidential election in Massachusetts
Party	Candidate	Running mate	Popular vote		Electoral vote	
Party	Candidate	Running mate	Count	%	Count	%
Republican	William McKinley of Ohio (incumbent)	Theodore Roosevelt of New York	238,866	57.59%	15	100.00%
Democratic	William Jennings Bryan of Nebraska	Adlai Ewing Stevenson I of Illinois	156,997	37.85%	0	0.00%
Social Democratic	Eugene Victor Debs of Indiana	Job Harriman of California	9,607	2.32%	0	0.00%
Prohibition	John Granville Woolley of Illinois	Henry Brewer Metcalf of Rhode Island	6,202	1.50%	0	0.00%
Socialist Labor	Joseph Francis Malloney of Massachusetts	Valentine Remmel of Pennsylvania	2,599	0.62%	0	0.00%
N/A	Others	Others	533	0.13%	0	0.00%
Total			414,804	100.00%	15	100.00%

== See also ==
- United States presidential elections in Massachusetts
