= McKinley vs. Bryan =

McKinley vs. Bryan may refer to one of two United States presidential elections won by William McKinley against William Jennings Bryan:

- 1896 United States presidential election, won by William McKinley against William Jennings Bryan
- 1900 United States presidential election, won by William McKinley against William Jennings Bryan
