= 1900 United States presidential election in New York =

- November 6, 1900
- Turnout: 84.6% ▲0.3 pp
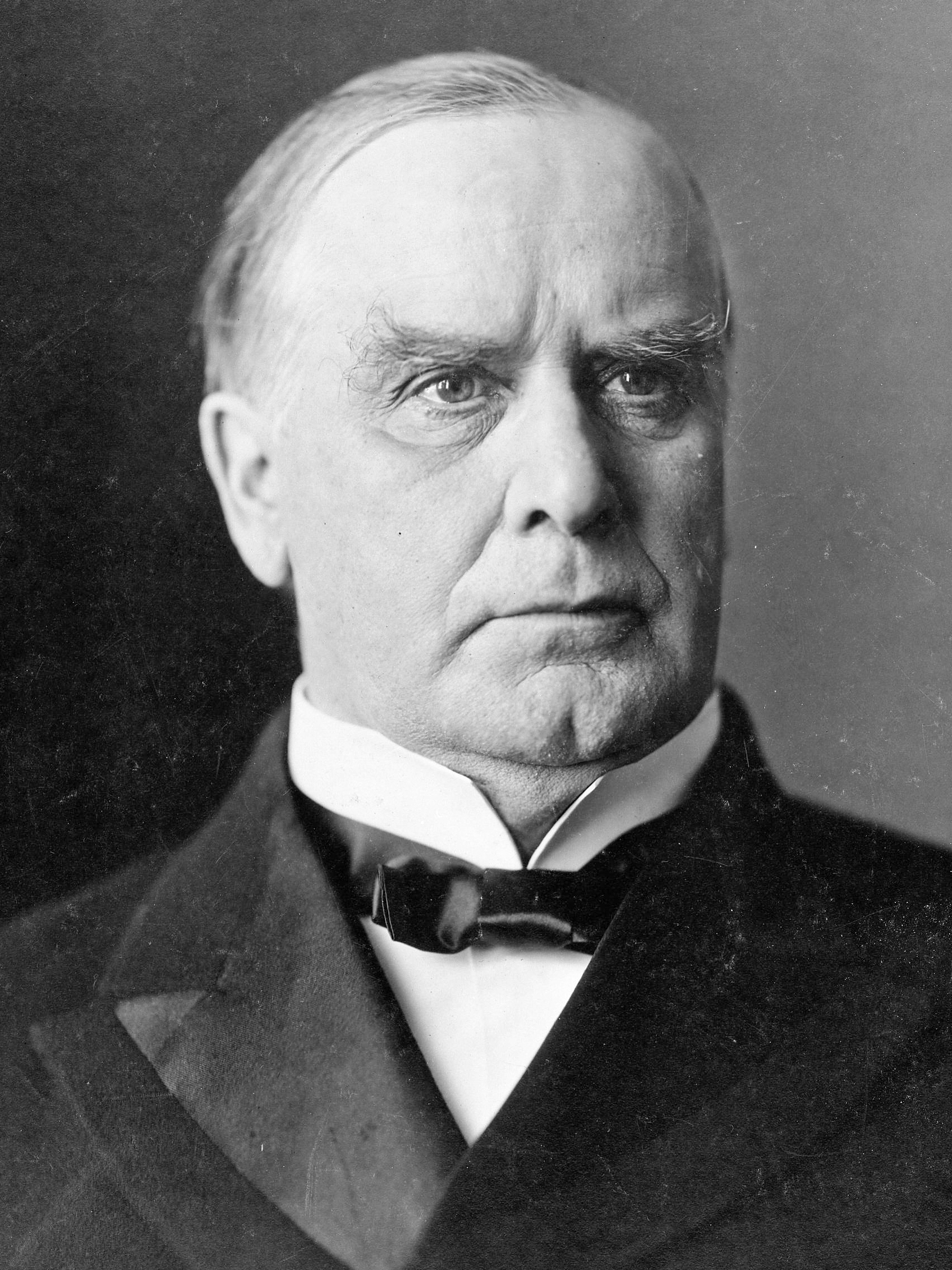

Nominee	William McKinley	William Jennings Bryan
Party	Republican	Democratic
Home state	Ohio	Nebraska
Running mate	Theodore Roosevelt	Adlai Stevenson I
Electoral vote	36	0
Popular vote	822,013	678,462
Percentage	53.10%	43.83%
County results
McKinley
40–50%
50–60%
60–70%
70–80%
Bryan
50–60%
President before election
William McKinley
Republican
Elected President
William McKinley
Republican

The 1900 United States presidential election in New York took place on November 6, 1900. All contemporary 45 states were part of the 1900 United States presidential election. Voters chose 36 electors to the Electoral College, which selected the president and vice president.

New York was won by the Republican nominees, incumbent President William McKinley of Ohio and his running mate Governor of New York Theodore Roosevelt. McKinley and Roosevelt defeated the Democratic nominees, former Congressman and 1896 presidential nominee William Jennings Bryan of Nebraska and his running mate former Vice President Adlai Stevenson I of Illinois. Also in the running was the Socialist candidate, Eugene V. Debs, who ran with Job Harriman.

McKinley carried New York State with 53.10 percent of the vote to Bryan's 43.83 percent, a victory margin of 9.27 points. New York weighed in for this election as about three percent more Republican than the national average. The 1900 election was a direct rematch between McKinley and Bryan, who had run against each other four years earlier in 1896. While New York would continue its Republican dominance of the Fourth Party System and that McKinley had slightly improved on his national margin, New York swung heavily in Bryan's favor in 1900. Four years earlier, McKinley had defeated Bryan in the state by 18.85 points, sweeping every county in the state except Palatine German Schoharie County, including rare Republican victories in New York City. McKinley's 1900 margin of victory in New York State was less than half of his 1896 margin, primarily due to dramatic Democratic gains in New York City. While in 1896 Bryan had lost New York City by about 60,000 votes, in 1900 Bryan won a majority of over 30,000 votes in New York City, winning Manhattan, the Bronx, Queens, and Staten Island. Bryan would lose New York City and New York state again against William Howard Taft in 1908.

== Results ==
1900 United States presidential election in New York
Party	Candidate	Votes	Percentage	Electoral votes
Republican	William McKinley (incumbent)	822,013	53.10%	36
Democratic	William Jennings Bryan	678,462	43.83%	0
Prohibition	John G. Woolley	22,077	1.43%	0
Social Democratic	Eugene V. Debs	12,869	0.83%	0
Socialist Labor	Joseph F. Maloney	12,622 (Note: The 1901 Legislative Manual gives the total as 12,621 but this appears to a mistake. The sum of the county results is 12,622 and this is the total given by both the New York Red Book and Tribune Almanac of 1901. Additionally, newspapers throughout the state all reported Maloney's total as 12,622 in December of 1900.)	0.82%	0
Totals		1,548,043	100.00%	36

=== New York City results ===
1900 Presidential Election in New York City		Manhattan	The Bronx	Brooklyn	Queens	Staten Island	Total	
Democratic	William Jennings Bryan	181,786		106,232	14,747	6,759	309,524	50.94%
Democratic	William Jennings Bryan	52.47%		48.32%	52.58%	51.20%	309,524	50.94%
Republican	William McKinley	153,001		108,977	12,323	6,042	280,343	46.14%
Republican	William McKinley	44.16%		49.57%	43.94%	45.77%	280,343	46.14%
Social Democratic	Eugene V. Debs	6,193		2,331	644	109	9,277	1.53%
Social Democratic	Eugene V. Debs	1.79%		1.06%	2.30%	0.83%	9,277	1.53%
Socialist Labor	Joseph F. Maloney	4,867		1,711	250	144	6,972	1.15%
Socialist Labor	Joseph F. Maloney	1.40%		0.78%	0.89%	1.09%	6,972	1.15%
Prohibition	John G. Woolley	640		597	82	147	1,446	0.24%
Prohibition	John G. Woolley	0.18%		0.27%	0.29%	1.11%	1,446	0.24%
TOTAL		346,487		219,848	28,046	13,201	607,582	100.00%

Map of the results in New York City, shaded accordingly to each candidate's winning percentages

=== Results by county ===
County	William McKinley Republican		William Jennings Bryan Democratic		John G. Woolley Prohibition		Eugene V. Debs Social Democratic		Joseph F. Maloney Socialist Labor		Margin		Total votes cast
County	#	%	#	%	#	%	#	%	#	%	#	%	Total votes cast
Albany	23,495	54.96%	18,752	43.86%	234	0.55%	64	0.15%	207	0.48%	4,743	11.10%	42,752
Allegany	7,200	62.05%	3,621	31.21%	759	6.54%	12	0.10%	11	0.09%	3,579	30.84%	11,603
Broome	10,397	58.00%	6,652	37.11%	848	4.73%	15	0.08%	14	0.08%	3,745	20.89%	17,926
Cattaraugus	9,948	59.52%	6,224	37.24%	502	3.00%	22	0.13%	17	0.10%	3,724	22.28%	16,713
Cayuga	10,328	59.99%	6,330	36.77%	339	1.97%	49	0.28%	171	0.99%	3,998	23.22%	17,217
Chautauqua	15,318	67.62%	6,660	29.40%	589	2.60%	42	0.19%	43	0.19%	8,658	38.22%	22,652
Chemung	6,921	49.45%	6,531	46.66%	384	2.74%	42	0.30%	119	0.85%	390	2.79%	13,997
Chenango	6,362	58.89%	4,043	37.42%	362	3.35%	18	0.17%	18	0.17%	2,319	21.47%	10,803
Clinton	6,326	58.81%	4,287	39.86%	118	1.10%	12	0.11%	13	0.12%	2,039	18.95%	10,756
Columbia	6,478	55.61%	4,953	42.52%	174	1.49%	20	0.17%	23	0.20%	1,525	13.09%	11,648
Cortland	4,895	60.99%	2,773	34.55%	347	4.32%	0	0.00%	11	0.14%	2,122	26.44%	8,026
Delaware	7,626	60.16%	4,639	36.60%	394	3.11%	7	0.06%	10	0.08%	2,987	23.56%	12,676
Dutchess	11,936	59.39%	7,691	38.27%	380	1.89%	21	0.10%	70	0.35%	4,245	21.12%	20,098
Erie	44,767	51.66%	39,833	45.97%	741	0.86%	391	0.45%	925	1.07%	4,934	5.69%	86,657
Essex	5,064	70.31%	1,994	27.69%	86	1.19%	44	0.61%	14	0.19%	3,070	42.62%	7,202
Franklin	6,313	68.49%	2,666	28.92%	213	2.31%	12	0.13%	13	0.14%	3,647	39.57%	9,217
Fulton	7,230	61.91%	3,678	31.49%	494	4.23%	98	0.84%	179	1.53%	3,552	30.42%	11,679
Genesee	5,385	59.82%	3,267	36.29%	264	2.93%	26	0.29%	60	0.67%	2,118	23.53%	9,002
Greene	4,395	49.32%	4,269	47.90%	137	1.54%	28	0.31%	83	0.93%	126	1.42%	8,912
Hamilton	651	54.98%	509	42.99%	22	1.86%	1	0.08%	1	0.08%	142	11.99%	1,184
Herkimer	8,100	57.77%	5,401	38.52%	298	2.13%	168	1.20%	55	0.39%	2,699	19.25%	14,022
Jefferson	11,870	61.03%	6,776	34.84%	576	2.96%	174	0.89%	55	0.28%	5,094	26.19%	19,451
Kings	108,977	49.57%	106,232	48.32%	597	0.27%	2,331	1.06%	1,711	0.78%	2,745	1.25%	219,848
Lewis	4,308	59.32%	2,857	39.34%	80	1.10%	8	0.11%	9	0.12%	1,451	19.98%	7,262
Livingston	5,608	56.72%	3,877	39.21%	383	3.87%	7	0.07%	12	0.12%	1,731	17.51%	9,887
Madison	7,174	63.37%	3,673	32.44%	362	3.20%	68	0.60%	44	0.39%	3,501	30.93%	11,321
Monroe	26,691	54.62%	19,611	40.13%	1,105	2.26%	1,019	2.09%	444	0.91%	7,080	14.49%	48,870
Montgomery	7,302	57.35%	5,138	40.36%	221	1.74%	24	0.19%	47	0.37%	2,164	16.99%	12,732
Nassau	6,994	61.03%	4,325	37.74%	101	0.88%	23	0.20%	17	0.15%	2,669	23.29%	11,460
New York	153,001	44.16%	181,786	52.47%	640	0.18%	6,193	1.79%	4,867	1.40%	-28,785	-8.31%	346,487
Niagara	9,352	53.13%	7,726	43.90%	430	2.44%	26	0.15%	67	0.38%	1,626	9.23%	17,601
Oneida	19,204	57.93%	12,820	38.67%	636	1.92%	113	0.34%	379	1.14%	6,384	19.26%	33,152
Onondaga	24,317	59.37%	14,698	35.89%	507	1.24%	336	0.82%	1,099	2.68%	9,619	23.48%	40,957
Ontario	7,707	56.46%	5,641	41.33%	279	2.04%	7	0.05%	16	0.12%	2,066	15.13%	13,650
Orange	14,137	57.12%	10,180	41.13%	343	1.39%	25	0.10%	64	0.26%	3,957	15.99%	24,749
Orleans	4,667	59.14%	2,851	36.13%	308	3.90%	20	0.25%	45	0.57%	1,816	23.01%	7,891
Oswego	11,160	60.44%	6,605	35.77%	587	3.18%	23	0.12%	89	0.48%	4,555	24.67%	18,464
Otsego	7,893	54.84%	6,142	42.67%	328	2.28%	11	0.08%	20	0.14%	1,751	12.17%	14,394
Putnam	2,219	61.11%	1,345	37.04%	37	1.02%	23	0.63%	7	0.19%	874	24.07%	3,631
Queens	12,323	43.94%	14,747	52.58%	82	0.29%	644	2.30%	250	0.89%	-2,424	-8.64%	28,046
Rensselaer	17,228	55.03%	13,464	43.01%	352	1.12%	83	0.27%	179	0.57%	3,764	12.02%	31,306
Richmond	6,042	45.77%	6,759	51.20%	147	1.11%	109	0.83%	144	1.09%	-717	-5.43%	13,201
Rockland	4,187	50.16%	4,021	48.17%	106	1.27%	26	0.31%	7	0.08%	166	1.99%	8,347
Saratoga	9,602	59.79%	5,916	36.84%	505	3.14%	14	0.09%	22	0.14%	3,686	22.95%	16,059
Schenectady	6,769	56.48%	4,783	39.91%	160	1.34%	32	0.27%	240	2.00%	1,986	16.57%	11,984
Schoharie	3,860	46.19%	4,317	51.66%	170	2.03%	3	0.04%	7	0.08%	-457	-5.47%	8,357
Schuyler	2,598	55.45%	1,889	40.32%	190	4.06%	2	0.04%	6	0.13%	709	15.13%	4,685
Seneca	3,787	51.18%	3,461	46.78%	122	1.65%	4	0.05%	25	0.34%	326	4.40%	7,399
St. Lawrence	15,296	71.02%	5,699	26.46%	486	2.26%	27	0.13%	31	0.14%	9,597	44.56%	21,539
Steuben	12,411	55.51%	8,872	39.68%	975	4.36%	48	0.21%	53	0.24%	3,539	15.83%	22,359
Suffolk	9,584	60.24%	5,711	35.90%	550	3.46%	34	0.21%	31	0.19%	3,873	24.34%	15,910
Sullivan	4,393	53.92%	3,625	44.49%	116	1.42%	4	0.05%	10	0.12%	768	9.43%	8,148
Tioga	4,747	59.09%	3,037	37.80%	243	3.02%	1	0.01%	6	0.07%	1,710	21.29%	8,034
Tompkins	5,409	55.79%	3,852	39.73%	372	3.84%	22	0.23%	41	0.42%	1,557	16.06%	9,696
Ulster	11,348	53.68%	9,349	44.22%	412	1.95%	5	0.02%	27	0.13%	1,999	9.46%	21,141
Warren	4,829	63.46%	2,540	33.38%	202	2.65%	11	0.14%	28	0.37%	2,289	30.08%	7,610
Washington	8,209	68.34%	3,357	27.95%	404	3.36%	24	0.20%	18	0.15%	4,852	40.39%	12,012
Wayne	7,955	62.29%	4,473	35.02%	320	2.51%	14	0.11%	9	0.07%	3,482	27.27%	12,771
Westchester	21,256	54.89%	16,439	42.45%	385	0.99%	228	0.59%	419	1.08%	4,817	12.44%	38,727
Wyoming	5,032	60.31%	2,896	34.71%	398	4.77%	6	0.07%	11	0.13%	2,136	25.60%	8,343
Yates	3,432	58.97%	2,199	37.78%	175	3.01%	5	0.09%	9	0.15%	1,233	21.19%	5,820
Totals	822,013	53.10%	678,462	43.83%	22,077	1.43%	12,869	0.83%	12,622	0.82%	143,551	9.27%	1,548,043

==== Counties that flipped from Republican to Democratic ====
- New York
- Queens
- Richmond

== See also ==
- United States presidential elections in New York
- Presidency of William McKinley
- Presidency of Theodore Roosevelt
