= Newspaper endorsements in the 1900 United States presidential election =

Newspapers made endorsements of candidates in the 1900 United States presidential election. Incumbent President William McKinley was the Republican candidate, and William Jennings Bryan the Democratic candidate, a rematch of the 1896 election.

Newspaper	1900 Endorsement	Largest Reported Circ.	Endorsement date	State	1896 Endorsement	Notes
New York Herald	William McKinley	75,000+	1900	New York	(blanks = to be filled in)	
New York World	William McKinley	75,000+	1900	New York		
New York Evening Post	William McKinley	23,244	1900	New York		
Brooklyn Eagle	William McKinley	20,000+	1900	New York		
The New York Times	William McKinley	20,000+	November 4, 1900	New York	William McKinley	
Chicago Tribune	William McKinley	75,000+	1900	Illinois	William McKinley	
Country Topics	William McKinley	89,000+	1900	Parts Unknown	William McKinley	
Baltimore Sun	William Jennings Bryan	20,000+	1900	Maryland	William McKinley	
The Arizona Republican	William McKinley	4,129	1900	Arizona Territory	William McKinley	
Canton Repository	William McKinley	6,563	1900	Ohio	William McKinley	
New Yorker Staats-Zeitung	William McKinley	20,000+	1900	New York		Prominent German-language paper.
Fort Wayne Journal Gazette	William Jennings Bryan	1,000+	1900	Indiana		
