= 1896 United States presidential election in Massachusetts =

- November 3, 1896
- Turnout: 70.6% ▼4.0 pp

Nominee	William McKinley	William Jennings Bryan
Party	Republican	Democratic
Alliance		Populist
Home state	Ohio	Nebraska
Running mate	Garret Hobart	Arthur Sewall
Electoral vote	15	0
Popular vote	278,976	105,711
Percentage	69.47%	26.32%

McKinley
50–60%
60–70%
70–80%
80–90%
90–100%
Bryan
40–50%
President before election
Grover Cleveland
Democratic
Elected President
William McKinley
Republican

The 1896 United States presidential election in Massachusetts took place on November 3, 1896, as part of the 1896 United States presidential election. Voters chose 15 representatives, or electors to the Electoral College, who voted for president and vice president.

Massachusetts overwhelmingly voted for the Republican nominee, former governor of Ohio William McKinley, over the Democratic nominee, former U.S. Representative from Nebraska William Jennings Bryan. McKinley won Massachusetts by a margin of 43.15%.

McKinley was able to win every county in the state of Massachusetts, including a rare Republican victory in Suffolk County, home to the state's capital and largest city, Boston. Bryan, running on a platform of free silver, appealed strongly to Western miners and farmers in the 1896 election, but had little appeal in the Northeastern states such as Massachusetts. Bryan would win Suffolk County during his rematch with McKinley in 1900 but would lose it again to William Howard Taft in 1908 (in both such elections, Bryan lost the state at-large).

With 69.47% of the popular vote, Massachusetts would be McKinley's second strongest victory in terms of percentage in the popular vote after neighboring Vermont.

This was the last occasion until 1984 that a Republican won the town of Blackstone in a presidential election.

== Results ==
1896 United States presidential election in Massachusetts
Party	Candidate	Votes	Percentage	Electoral votes
Republican	William McKinley	278,976	69.47%	15
Democratic	William Jennings Bryan	90,610	22.56%	0
Populist	William Jennings Bryan	15,101	3.76%	0
Total	William Jennings Bryan	105,711	26.32%	0
National Democratic	John M. Palmer	11,749	2.93%	0
Prohibition	Joshua Levering	2,998	0.75%	0
Socialist Labor	Charles H. Matchett	2,114	0.53%	0
No party	Write-ins	20	0.01%	0
Invalid or blank votes				—
Totals		401,568	100.00%	15
Voter turnout				—

== See also ==
- United States presidential elections in Massachusetts
