= 1900 United States presidential election =

Re-election of William McKinley

- November 6, 1900

447 members of the Electoral College 224 electoral votes needed to win
- Turnout: 73.7% (▼5.9 pp)
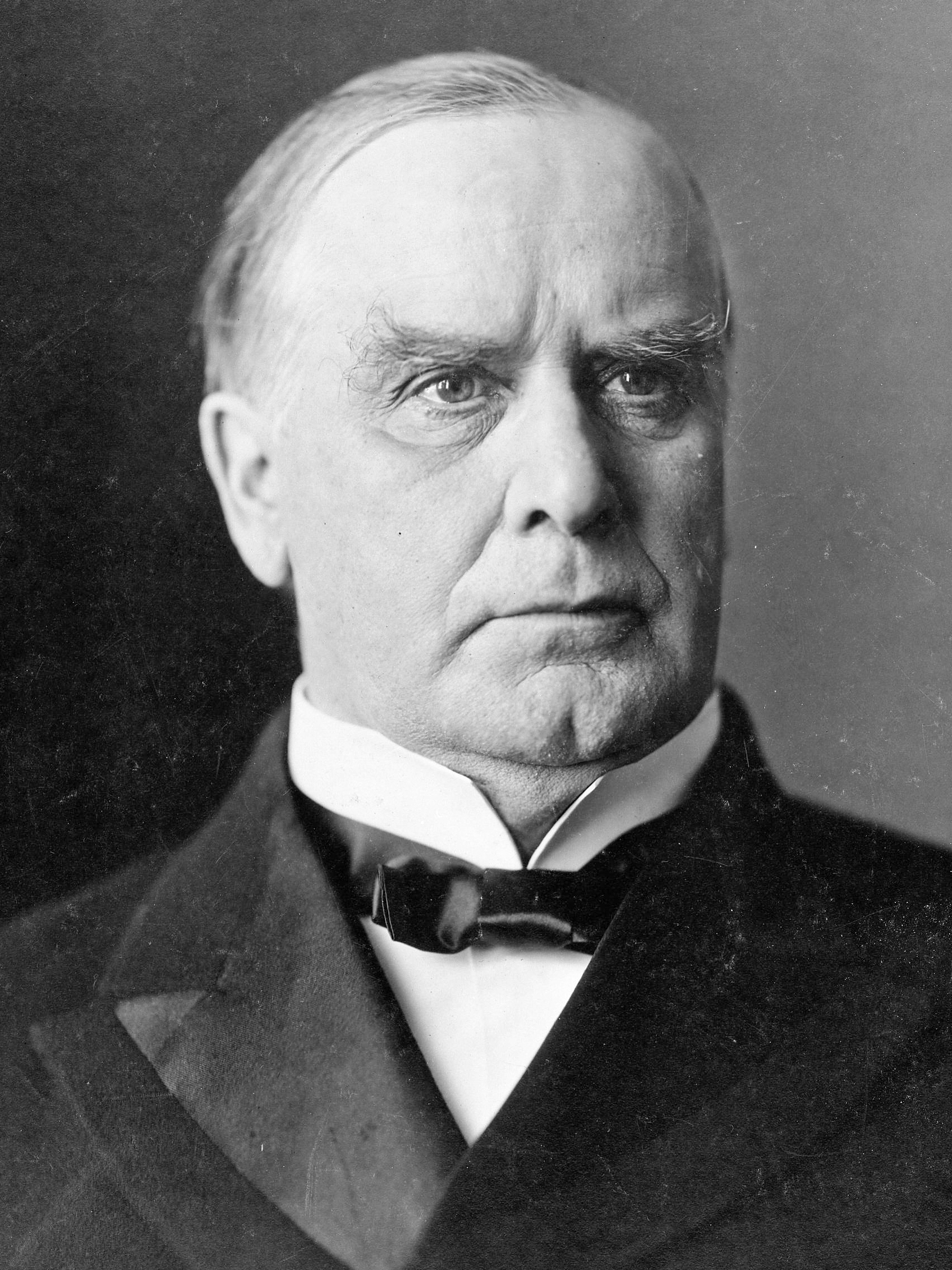

Nominee	William McKinley	William Jennings Bryan
Party	Republican	Democratic
Alliance		Parties: "Fusion" Populist; Lincoln Republican; Anti-Imperialist League
Home state	Ohio	Nebraska
Running mate	Theodore Roosevelt	Adlai Stevenson I
Electoral vote	292	155
States carried	28	17
Popular vote	7,228,864	6,370,932
Percentage	51.6%	45.5%
- Presidential election results map. Red denotes states won by McKinley/Roosevelt, blue denotes those won by Bryan/Stevenson. Numbers indicate the number of electoral votes allotted to each state.
President before election
William McKinley
Republican
Elected President
William McKinley
Republican

A presidential election was held in the United States on November 6, 1900. Incumbent Republican President William McKinley defeated his Democratic challenger, William Jennings Bryan in a rematch of the 1896 United States presidential election.

McKinley and Bryan each faced little opposition within their own parties. Although some Gold Democrats explored the possibility of a campaign by Admiral George Dewey, Bryan was easily re-nominated at the 1900 Democratic National Convention after Dewey withdrew from the race. McKinley was unanimously re-nominated at the 1900 Republican National Convention. As Vice President Garret Hobart had died in 1899, the Republican convention chose New York Governor Theodore Roosevelt as McKinley's running mate.

The return of economic prosperity and recent victory in the Spanish–American War helped McKinley score a decisive victory, while Bryan's anti-imperialist stance and continued support for bimetallism attracted only limited support. McKinley carried most states outside of the Solid South and won 51.6% of the popular vote. The election results were similar to those of 1896, though McKinley picked up several Western states and Bryan picked up Kentucky.

McKinley's victory made him the first president since Ulysses S. Grant in 1872 to win re-election to a consecutive second term. Six months into his second term, McKinley was assassinated, and his vice president, Theodore Roosevelt, succeeded him.

== Nominations ==
=== Republican Party nomination ===
Republican Party (United States) 1900 Republican Party ticket
William McKinley	Theodore Roosevelt
for President	for Vice President
25th President of the United States (1897–1901)	33rd Governor of New York (1899–1900)

The 926 delegates to the Republican convention, which met in Philadelphia on June 19–21, re-nominated President William McKinley by acclamation. Thomas C. Platt, the "boss" of the New York State Republican Party, did not like Theodore Roosevelt, New York's popular governor, even though he was a fellow Republican. Roosevelt's efforts to reform New York politics – including Republican politics – led Platt and other state Republican leaders to pressure President McKinley to accept Roosevelt as his new vice presidential candidate, thus filling the spot left open when Vice President Garret Hobart died in 1899. By electing Roosevelt vice president, Platt would remove Roosevelt from New York state politics. Although Roosevelt was reluctant to accept the nomination for vice president, which he regarded as a relatively trivial and powerless office, his great popularity among most Republican delegates led McKinley to pick him as his new running mate. Quite unexpectedly, Roosevelt would be elevated to the presidency in September 1901, when McKinley was assassinated in Buffalo, New York.

The balloting
Presidential ballot		Vice presidential ballot	
William McKinley	926	Theodore Roosevelt	925
		Not voting	1 (Theodore Roosevelt)

=== Democratic Party nomination ===
Campaign poster promoting Democratic nominee William J. Bryan

Democratic Party (United States) 1900 Democratic Party ticket
William Jennings Bryan	Adlai Stevenson
for President	for Vice President
U.S. Representative for Nebraska's 1st (1891–1895)	23rd Vice President of the United States (1893–1897)
Campaign

==== Other candidates ====
Candidates are sorted by date of withdrawal
George Dewey

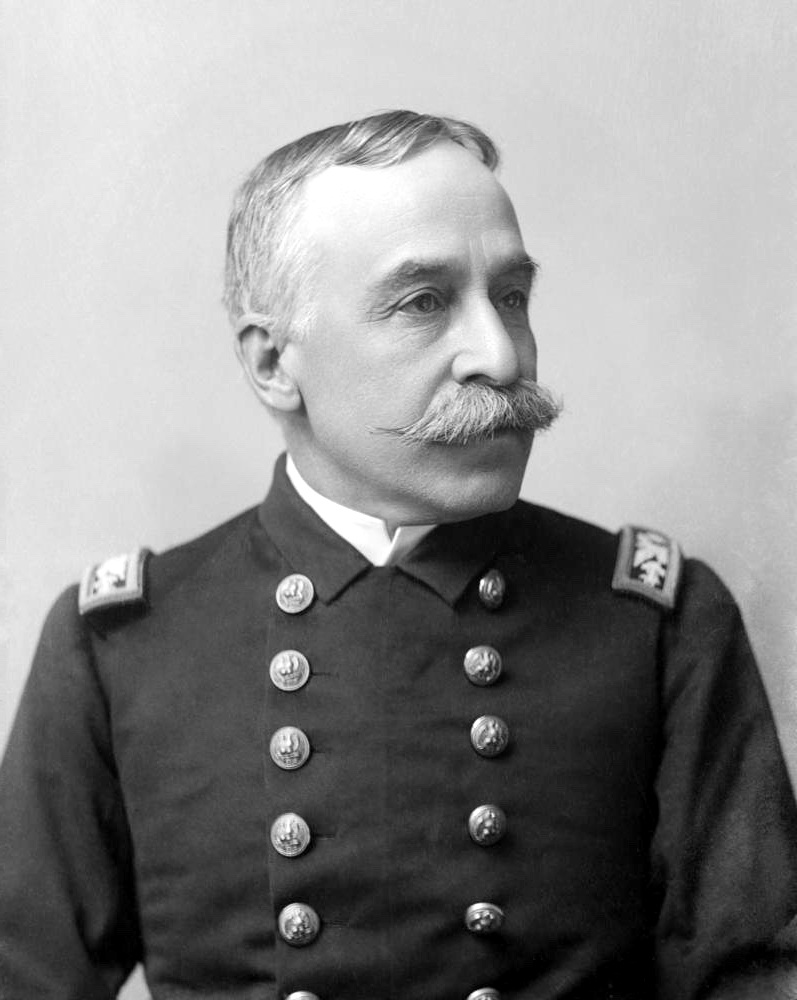

Admiral of the Navy from Vermont (1899–1917)
W: May 17, 1900
EM: 1900

After Admiral George Dewey's return from the Spanish–American War, many suggested that he run for president on the Democratic ticket. Dewey, however, had already angered some Protestants by marrying the Catholic Mildred McLean Hazen (the widow of General William Babcock Hazen and daughter of Washington McLean, owner of The Washington Post) in November 1899 and giving her the house that the nation had given him following the war. His candidacy was also almost immediately plagued by a number of public relations gaffes. Newspapers started attacking him as naïve after he was quoted as saying the job of president would be easy, since the chief executive was merely following orders in executing the laws enacted by Congress, and that he would "execute the laws of Congress as faithfully as I have always executed the orders of my superiors." Shortly thereafter, he admitted never having voted in a presidential election before, mentioning that the only man he ever would have voted for, had he voted, would have been Grover Cleveland. He drew even more criticism when he offhandedly (and prophetically) told a newspaper reporter that, "Our next war will be with Germany."

Dewey's campaign was met with pessimism by Gold Democrats on whose support his campaign depended. Some even threw their support to Bryan, believing him to be the stronger candidate. As early as three days into his candidacy, his campaign having been damaged by the aforementioned missteps, rumors abounded regarding Dewey's impending withdrawal which proved false. Further injuries were made, however, when it became clear that the Democratic Party leaders of Vermont, Dewey's home state, were hostile to him and wholly committed to Bryan. Ohio similarly went for Bryan, though with the caveat that some leaders there suggested dropping all mention of silver from the party platform. By May 5, John Roll McLean — Dewey's brother-in-law and de facto campaign manager — defected from the campaign and was widely considered to be silently supporting Bryan. Dewey recognized soon afterward that he had very little chance of gathering enough delegates from Western and Southern states to keep Bryan from attaining a two-thirds majority at the convention, publicly commenting on May 17 that he no longer knew why he had even run for president at all. He effectively withdrew at about this time. There was some support in June for his nomination as vice president on the ticket alongside Bryan; however, Dewey resolutely refused to be considered.

Once Dewey withdrew, William Jennings Bryan faced little opposition for the nomination. He won it at the 1900 Democratic National Convention in Kansas City, Missouri on July 4–6, garnering 936 delegate votes.

Presidential ballot
William Jennings Bryan	936

Official or speculated candidates for the vice-presidential nomination:

- Adlai Stevenson I, Former Vice President and former Representative from Illinois
- Charles A. Towne, Former Representative from Minnesota
- Elliott Danforth, Former Democratic State Committee Chairman from New York
- William Sulzer, Representative from New York
- Joseph C. Sibley, Representative from Pennsylvania
- Robert E. Pattison, Former Governor of Pennsylvania
- George F. Williams, Former Representative from Massachusetts
- James P. Tarvin, Judge from Kentucky
- George B. McClellan Jr., Representative from New York
- John W. Daniel, Senator and Former Representative from Virginia
- John J. Lentz, Representative from Ohio
- Carter Harrison IV, Mayor of Chicago, Illinois
- John W. Keller, Charities Commissioner of New York City, from New York
- David B. Hill, Former Senator from and former Governor of New York
- John Walter Smith, Representative from Maryland
- Jim Hogg, Former Governor of Texas
- Edward Atkinson, Economist and founding member of the American Anti-Imperialist League from Massachusetts
- Winfield Scott Schley, Rear Admiral in the United States Navy from Maryland
- Henry Clay Caldwell, Federal Judge from Arkansas
- Alton B. Parker, Chief Judge from New York
- Benjamin F. Shively, Former Representative from Indiana
- George Dewey, Admiral of the Navy from Vermont
- William Randolph Hearst, Business magnate from New York
- William Frederick "Buffalo Bill" Cody, soldier, bison hunter and showman from Colorado
- Augustus Van Wyck, Former Court Justice from New York

Vice presidential ballot
Ballot	1st before shifts	1st after shifts
Adlai E. Stevenson	559.5	936
David B. Hill	200	0
Charles A. Towne	89.5	0
Abraham W. Patrick	46	0
Julian Carr	23	0
John Walter Smith	16	0
Elliott Danforth	1	0
Jim Hogg	1	0

=== People's Party nomination ===
As the nation's third-largest party, the Populists had made an organizational decision in 1896 to "fuse" with the Democratic Party on the national level, their identity kept separate by the nomination of two different candidates for vice president. At the state level, local Populist parties were left at liberty to proceed as they saw fit. In the Plains states, the Populists fused with the Democrats and, in some states, replaced them entirely. In the South, the Populists fused with the Republican Party. The result, though Bryan was defeated, was that the Populists greatly enlarged their representation in Congress from 10 to 26. In several southern states, however, the legislatures were still controlled by the Democrats, and they began passing a series of laws to eliminate the franchise for black voters with the intention of undermining a significant bloc of Populist support. The move had its intended consequences; in the 1898 mid-term election, Populist representation in the House of Representatives fell to 9, its lowest level since the party was founded.

The treatment of Populists by Democrats led to a division within the party. On May 17, 1899, Populist leaders met in St. Louis and issued an address calling for a "Middle of the Road" policy in which the party would decline future fusion efforts. The statement was primarily aimed at the party's national chairman, U.S. Senator Marion Butler of North Carolina, who had been elected to the Senate through fusion with North Carolina Republicans and was already working for the renomination of William Jennings Bryan on the 1900 Populist ticket. The pro-fusion leaders of the Populists fought back in early 1900. The first state party known to have split was the Nebraska party, which divided during its state convention on March 19. Both factions appointed delegates to the national convention, scheduled for Cincinnati. Ultimately, the Fusion Populists decided to hold a separate national convention when it became apparent that the Ohio Populists did not favor fusion and were working to organize a convention which would not nominate Bryan.

==== "Fusion" Populist nomination ====
1900 "Fusionist" People's Party ticket
William Jennings Bryan	Adlai Stevenson
for President	for Vice President
U.S. Representative for Nebraska's 1st (1891–1895)	23rd Vice President of the United States (1893–1897)
Campaign

The "Fusion" Populist National Convention assembled in a large tent just west of Sioux Falls, South Dakota on May 9 and unanimously nominated Bryan for the presidency. Charles Towne, the leader of the Silver Republican Party, was almost unanimously nominated as his running mate, facing only weak opposition from Representative John Lentz from Ohio. When Adlai Stevenson won the Democratic vice-presidential nomination over Towne, Towne withdrew from the race and the Fusion Populists endorsed Stevenson.

==== "Middle of the Road" Populist nomination ====
1900 "Middle-Road" People's Party ticket
Wharton Barker	Ignatius Donnelly
for President	for Vice President
Financier and Publisher from Pennsylvania	Member of the Minnesota; House of Representatives (1897–1898)

Meeting in Cincinnati, Ohio, the "Middle of the Road" faction adopted a platform that called for the creation of fiat money, government ownership of key industries and the opening of conservation lands for economic development. Businessman Wharton Barker was nominated for the presidency, while Representative Ignatius Donnelly was chosen as his running mate.

The balloting
Presidential ballot	1st	2nd	Vice presidential ballot	1st
Wharton Barker	314.4	370	Ignatius L. Donnelly	715
Milford W. Howard	326.6	336		
Ignatius L. Donnelly	70	7		
Others	3	2		

=== Minor party nominations ===
==== Social Democratic Party nomination ====
Social Democratic Party of America 1900 Social Democratic Party ticket
Eugene Debs	Job Harriman
for President	for Vice President
State Representative from Indiana (1885–1887)	Attorney at Law from California

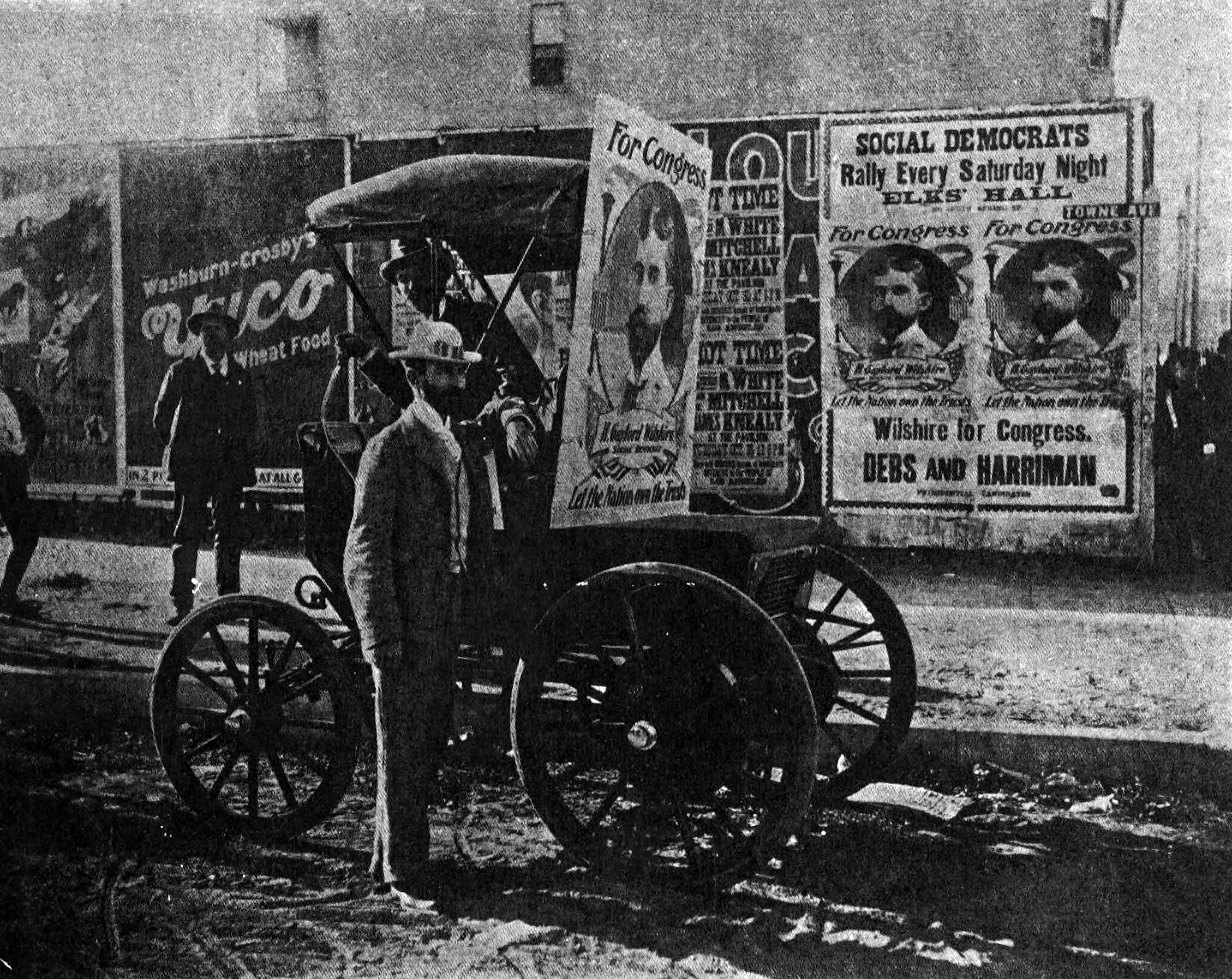
Gaylord Wilshire, Los Angeles publisher, during his 1900 congressional campaign on the Social Democratic ticket

Social Democracy of America was founded by in June 1897, and was later reformed as the Social Democratic Party of America in 1898 while the Socialist Labor Party of America was having internal struggles. James F. Carey, who had been elected to the city council in Haverhill, Massachusetts, was expelled from the Socialist Labor Party. Eugene V. Debs, Carey, and Sylvester Keliher founded the Social Democratic Party. Carey and Louis M. Scates were elected to the Massachusetts House of Representatives while John C. Chase was elected as mayor of Haverhill. Victor L. Berger led the party in Milwaukee, Wisconsin, and a slate of candidates received almost six percent of the vote in the 1898 election. Twenty members had been elected to office by 1900.

Morris Hillquit and members of his faction, the Kangaroos, in the Socialist Labor Party attempted to oust Daniel De Leon from the party's leadership at the 1899 convention. The Kangaroo faction was removed from the party and formed their own Socialist Labor Party. The Kangaroo faction lost a court case against De Leon for control of the party. They nominated Job Harriman for president and Max S. Hayes for vice president although they were not meant to run in the 1900 election and were instead used for a compromise with the Social Democratic Party of America.

The Social Democrats had been invited to the Kangaroos' convention, but declined although the Social Democrats supported unity between the parties. The Social Democratic National Executive Board allowed for the Kangaroo faction to send delegates to its national convention. The Kangaroos passed a resolution supporting unity and created a unity committee. Sixty-seven delegates from thirty-two states attuned the 1900 convention and voted by acclamation to give their presidential nomination to Debs. Hayes and Harriman were both nominated for the vice-presidential nomination and Harriman won it.

The executive board announced on May 12, 1900, that they would not support unity with the Kangaroos after accusing them of being too dogmatic and impeding a unity referendum. The Kangaroo unity committee sent out sent out ballots to members of both groups and both voted in favor of unity. The Kangaroos nominated Debs and Harriman as their presidential ticket which Debs accepted on July 31. Debs and George D. Herron started the party's campaign on September 29, at Chicago's Music Hall. Debs received 87,945 votes with his largest amount of support coming from New York and Illinois. Debs received over ten times the number of votes in Chicago that the Socialist Labor Party had in the 1896 election. Debs received more votes than any presidential ticket from the Socialist Labor Party. The Kangaroo faction and the Social Democrats later merged into the Socialist Party of America in 1901.

==== Prohibition Party nomination ====
1900 Prohibition Party ticket
John Woolley	Henry Metcalf
for President	for Vice President
Editor of The New Voice from Illinois	State Senator from Rhode Island (1885–1886)

===== Other candidates =====
Candidates in this section are sorted by performance
Silas C. Swallow	Hale Johnson
Methodist Preacher from Pennsylvania	Mayor of Newton, Illinois (???–???)
320 votes	W: Before 1st Ballot (endorsed Woolley)

The Prohibition Party met in Chicago, Illinois on June 28 to nominate their presidential ticket. Hale Johnson, who had been their vice-presidential nominee in 1896, withdrew his name immediately before the balloting was to begin. John G. Woolley was nominated on the first ballot, with Henry B. Metcalf of Rhode Island nominated to be his running mate in short order.

The Balloting
Presidential Ballot	1st	Vice Presidential Ballot	1st
John G. Woolley	380	Henry B. Metcalf	349
Silas C. Swallow	320	Thomas Carskadon	132
		E. L. Eaton	113
Not Voting	35		141

==== Lincoln Republican nomination ====
1900 Lincoln Republican ticket
William Jennings Bryan	Adlai Stevenson
for President	for Vice President
U.S. Representative for Nebraska's 1st (1891–1895)	23rd Vice President of the United States (1893–1897)
Campaign

The Lincoln Republican Party, formerly the Silver Republican Party, had by 1900 come to recognize that the issue of bimetallism had been superseded by that of imperialism, and it was hoped that a broader platform in line with the perceived values of Abraham Lincoln would allow the Party to evolve beyond its singular issue of free silver.

The Lincoln Republicans assembled in Kansas City, Missouri, at the same time as the Democratic National Convention held in the same city. Committed to endorsing William Jennings Bryan for the presidency, the primary aim of many of those attending was to promote the nomination of national chairman Charles Towne for the vice presidency by the Democratic Party, an effort endorsed by Fusionist Populists who had nominated Towne to the same position two months earlier. Unfortunately for those who boomed Towne these efforts may have backfired, pushing away Democratic delegates who might have otherwise been favorable to Towne by presenting the ticket of Bryan and Towne as a fait accompli, with Southern Democratic delegates themselves preferring a vice-presidential nominee who'd appeal to voters the Democratic Party lost in the Northeast and Midwest four years prior. Hopes for a personal endorsement of Towne by Bryan were also dashed when Bryan, who personally preferred Towne of those candidates in running and was expected to make mention of this in an acceptance, decided against going to the convention or involving himself in the vice-presidential contest. Ultimately, Towne was a distant third, with Adlai Stevenson winning the nod.

The nomination of Stevenson, who'd previously served as Grover Cleveland's vice president, outraged many of the Lincoln Republicans still in attendance, and in the ensuing pandemonium attempts were made to nominate Charles Towne for the vice presidency. Only when Charles Towne himself addressed the convention did the anger settle. Declining the efforts to nominate him, Towne pleaded with the delegates present to accept and support the Democratic ticket as it was, noting that Bryan was at the head of it and much of the Democratic Platform was aligned with that of the Lincoln Republicans. Others, such as Senator Fred Dubois, Senator Henry Teller, and John Shafroth made similar speeches calling for support for Bryan and Stevenson. It was eventually decided that the question of the vice presidential nomination would be handled by the National Committee. They would formalize and endorsement of Adlai Stevenson for the vice presidency the following day, in deference to Towne's wishes.

==== Anti-Imperialist League nomination ====
1900 Anti-Imperialist League ticket
William Jennings Bryan	Adlai Stevenson
for President	for Vice President
U.S. Representative for Nebraska's 1st (1891–1895)	23rd Vice President of the United States (1893–1897)
Campaign

The American Anti-Imperialist League had been formed in 1898 in opposition to the acquisition of the Philippine Islands, considering its annexation violating the concept of "consent of the governed". While not formalized as a political party, there existed a movement within the League that sought to nominate an independent ticket to run solely on the platform of anti-imperialism or, barring that, to endorse whichever Republican or Democratic presidential nominee that was themselves anti-imperialist. Upon the nominations of McKinley and Bryan however, there were immediate divisions on whether to endorse Bryan and the Democratic Platform, many sympathizing Republicans and Gold Democrats finding it anathema to their own political philosophies beyond its denouncement of imperialism; already by July some were considering supporting McKinley in November. Later that same month a call was made for a National Convention to meet in Indianapolis on August 15 with the intention of either endorsing or nominating a ticket for the general election. Discussions were held with remnants of National Democratic Party about the possibility of a fusion ticket, but this was voted down by their national committee. Then discussed names for possible presidential candidates were former Speaker Thomas Reed, former Secretary of State Richard Olney, former Massachusetts Governor George Boutwell, and former Senator John Henderson.

From the beginning the headwinds were in Bryan's favor, with permanent President George Boutwell addressing the convention and calling for the endorsement of the Democratic ticket, this followed in speeches by former General John Beatty, Edgar Bancroft, and Gamaliel Bradford. The resolution to endorse Bryan however was subject to prolonged debate, its principal opponents being representatives of the "third-ticket" movement led by Thomas Osborne. Osborne and those who followed him theorized that many anti-imperialists would not be willing to vote for Bryan or in favor of the Democratic Platform, and would be better served by a candidate of their own. Charles Codman, the author of the resolution, and Edwin Burritt Smith countered that all issues were secondary to the issue of imperialism, and that the most effective means by which to put an anti-imperialist in office should be used. In a voice vote, the Platform of the "Liberty Congress" as it was then known as adopted overwhelmingly, with all amendments to strike the endorsement of the Bryan/Stevenson ticket being voted down. Osborne and other "third-ticketers" would then bolt to the then nearby organizing National Party.

==== National Party nomination ====
1900 National Party ticket
Donelson Caffery	Archibald Howe
for President	for Vice President
U.S. Senator from Louisiana (1892–1901); DN: September 21	Attorney at Law and Historian from Massachusetts DN: September 22

The National Party was an outgrowth of the "third-ticket" movement that existed within the Anti-Imperialist League. The first steps towards its formation were taken after the failure of a number of anti-imperialists, among them Thomas Osborne and John Jay Chapman, to convince the National Democratic Party to either nominate or endorse a third party ticket. A statement was then released by the attending League delegates from New York, denouncing both the Republican and Democratic parties, advocating for the independence of the Philippines and Porto Rico [sic], supporting gold standard and a sound banking system, calling for the abolition of special privileges, and demanding a public service based on merit exclusively. They also called for a national convention to be held from August 14 to 15, which would have placed it alongside the "national" League Convention that was being held from August 15 to August 16.

As the delegates arrived in Indianapolis, it was hoped that the League could be convinced to nominate a third party ticket, with the National Party then offering its endorsement. It swiftly became clear however that the majority of the delegates to the Anti-Imperialist League Convention were in sympathy with Bryan and prepared to endorse him, and attempts on the part of anti-Bryan delegates to kept the platform at least non-committal on the subject of the presidential race were unsuccessful. Those League delegates that were associated with the National Party then left and proceeded to elect Thomas Osborne as Permanent Chairman, calling for a new national convention to be held on September 5. It is claimed that at the time the National Party presidential nomination was offered to Moorfield Storey, but Storey declined and ultimately opted to run as an Anti-Imperialist Independent in the 11th District of Massachusetts; William Jackson Palmer was suggested as a vice-presidential nominee to run alongside him.

Meeting in Carnegie Hall (then Chamber Music Hall) on 5 September, the National Party was formalized, nominating Senator Donelson Caffery of Louisiana for the presidency, and historian Archibald Howe of Massachusetts for the vice presidency. Though there was some concern over whether Caffery would accept the nomination if offered, Osborne claimed that he had been communicating with Caffrey and that he was both sympathetic to the National Party and willing to be their candidate for the presidency. The party platform was virtually identical to the one offered by the League committee back in July, though the definition of "special privileges was defined as "subsidies, bounties, undeserved pensions, or trust-busting tariffs." A strategy was also adopted where, in those States where it was impractical to nominate a full slate of electors, a single elector would be nominated instead, allowing for voters to vote the Nationalist ticket as well as one other of their choice; it was hoped that this might avail concerns that the Nationalists would take votes away from either Bryan or McKinley, depending on the voters' sympathies.

Unfortunately for the Nationalist Party Senator Cafferty declined the nomination some weeks later, resulting in a scramble where Arthur Briggs Farquhar, owner of the Pennsylvania Agricultural Works, was considered as a possible replacement. A day later, on September 21, the Massachusetts branch of the Party voted to disband. It was then hoped that unpledged electors could be nominated, but papers were only ever taken out for one, Edward Waldo Emerson of Massachusetts.

==== Other nominations ====
The Union Reform Party nominated Seth H. Ellis of Ohio for president and Samuel T. Nicholson for vice president in a member referendum. Some members of the party had supported the National Party in the previous election. Ellis promised to introduce a constitutional amendment to allow for national popular initiatives and referendums as a solution to political corruption and unrepresentative government.

The United Christian Party nominated Jonah F. R. Leonard for president, and David H. Martin for vice president. Initially, the party had nominated Silas C. Swallow for president and John G. Woolley for vice president, but both men refused, choosing instead to contest the Prohibition Party nomination (of which Woolley would emerge the victor).

== General election ==
=== Campaign ===
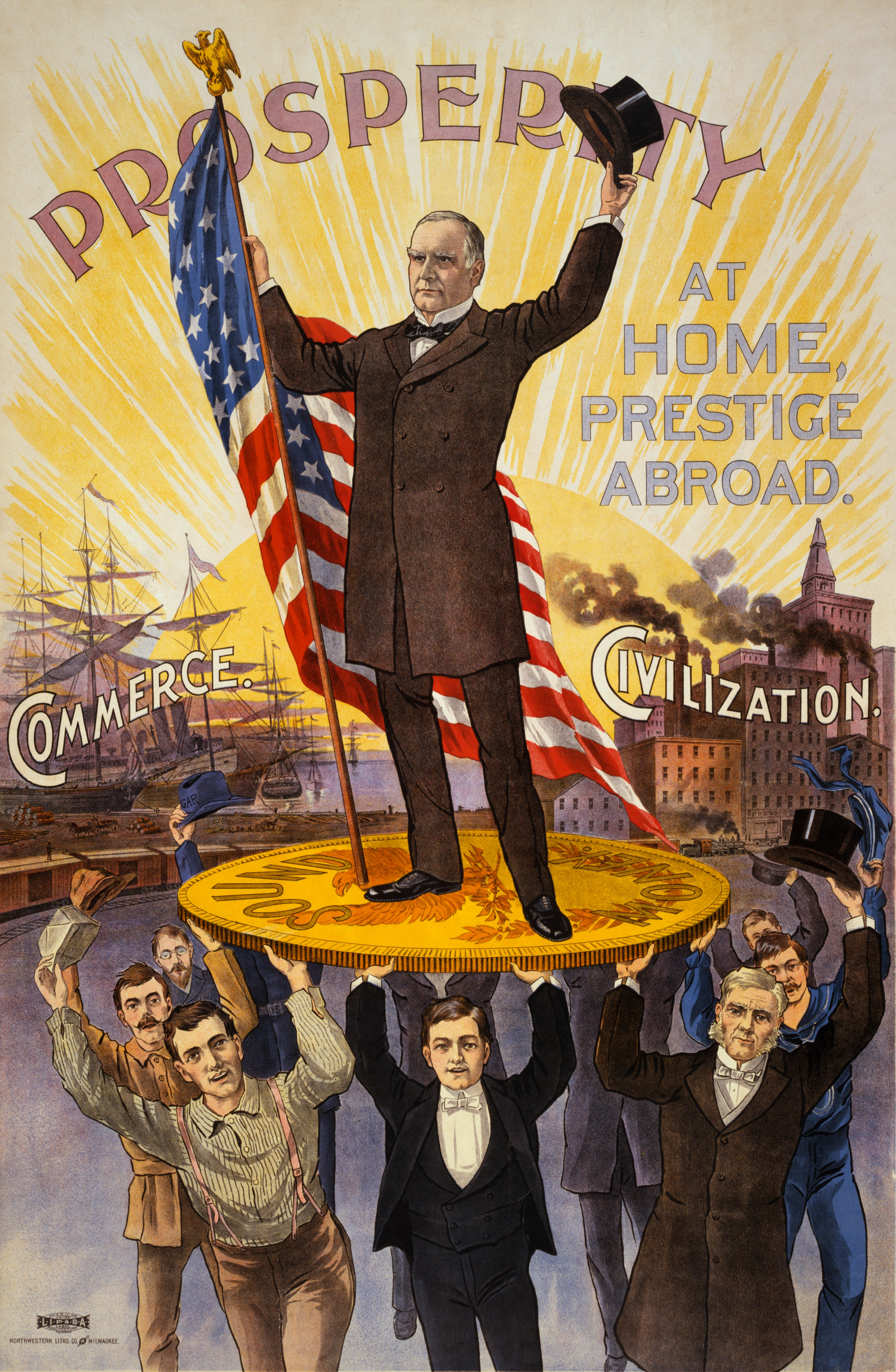
McKinley campaigns on gold coin (gold standard) with support from soldiers, businessmen, farmers and professionals, claiming to restore prosperity at home and victory abroad

The economy was booming in 1900, so the Republican slogan of "Four More Years of the Full Dinner Pail," combined with victory in the brief Spanish–American War in 1898, had a powerful electoral appeal. Teddy Roosevelt had become a national hero fighting in Cuba during the war, and as such he was a popular spokesman for the Republican ticket. Roosevelt proved highly energetic, and an equal match for William Jennings Bryan's famous barnstorming style of campaigning. Roosevelt's theme was that McKinley had brought America peace and prosperity and deserved re-election. In a whirlwind campaign, Roosevelt made 480 stops in 23 states. In his speeches, he repeatedly argued that the war had been just and had liberated the Cubans and Filipinos from Spanish tyranny:

Four years ago the nation was uneasy because at our very doors an American island was writhing in hideous agony under a worse than medieval despotism. We had our Armenia at our threshold. The situation in Cuba had become such that we could no longer stand quiet and retain one shred of self-respect.... We drew the sword and waged the most righteous and brilliantly successful foreign war that this generation has seen.

Bryan's campaign was built around the issue of imperialism and the Philippine-American War. Bryan had supported the Spanish-American War, but opposed the annexation of the Philippines. He said McKinley had simply replaced a cruel Spanish tyranny with a cruel American one. Bryan was especially harsh in his criticisms of the American military effort to suppress a bloody rebellion by Filipino guerillas. This theme won over some previous opponents, especially "hard money" Germans, former Gold Democrats, and anti-imperialists such as Andrew Carnegie. In addition, he was not as successful in 1900, because prosperity had replaced severe depression and McKinley claimed credit. Advocates of enlarging the money supply to raise prices had to admit that a great deal of new gold was flowing into the world economy, and deflation (i.e. falling prices) was no longer a threat.

Both candidates repeated their 1896 campaign techniques, with McKinley campaigning again from the front porch of his home in Canton, Ohio. At the peak of the campaign, he greeted sixteen delegations and 30,000 cheering supporters in one day. Meanwhile, Bryan took to the rails again, traveling 18,000 miles to hundreds of rallies across the Midwest and East. This time, he was matched by Theodore Roosevelt, who campaigned just as energetically in 24 states, covering 21,000 miles by train.

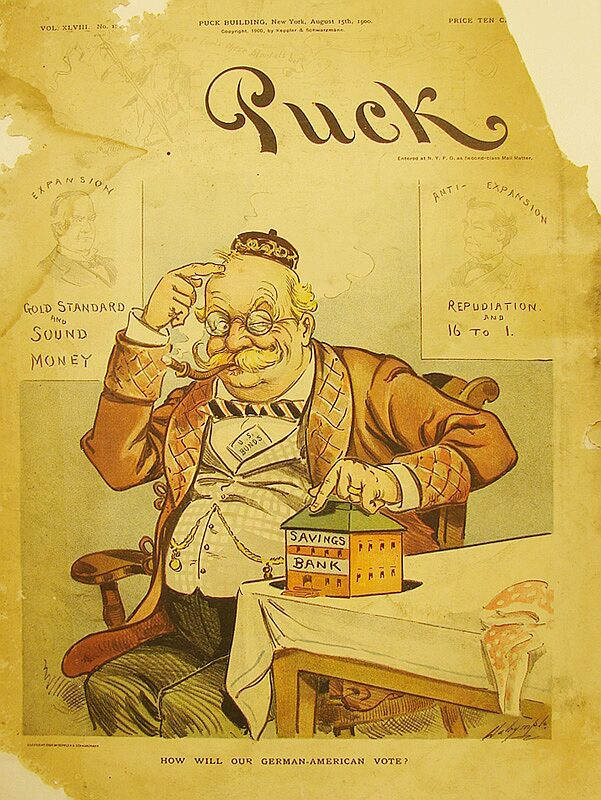
The German-American vote in 1900 was in doubt since they opposed both Bryan's "repudiation" policy and overseas "expansion" under McKinley.

The triumph of the American army and navy in the war against Spain was a decisive factor in building Republican support. Democrats tried to argue that the war was not over because of the insurgency in the Philippines; this became their major issue. A perception that the Philippine–American War was coming to an end would be an electoral asset for the Republicans, and the McKinley administration stated that there were reductions of troops there. Republicans pledged that the fighting in the Philippines would die down of its own accord within sixty days of McKinley's re-election. However, as one lieutenant explained in a letter to his wife, "It looks good on paper, but there really has been no reduction of the force here. These battalions [being sent home] are made up on men...about to be discharged."

In addition, Secretary of War Elihu Root had a report from MacArthur of September 1900 that he did not release until after the election. General Arthur MacArthur, Jr., had been in command of the Philippines for four months, warning Washington that the war was not lessening and that the end was not even in sight. MacArthur believed that the guerrilla stage of the war was just beginning and that Filipinos were refining their techniques through experience. Furthermore, Philippine leader Emilio Aguinaldo's strategy had popular support. MacArthur wrote:

The success of this unique system of war depends upon almost complete unity of action of the entire native population. That such unity is a fact is too obvious to admit of discussion; how it is brought about and maintained is not so plain. Intimidation has undoubtedly accomplished much to this end, but fear as the only motive is hardly sufficient to account for the united and apparently spontaneous action of several millions of people. One traitor in each town would eventually destroy such a complex organization. It is more probable that the adhesive principle comes from ethological homogeneity, which induces men to respond for a time to the appeals of consanguineous leadership even when such action is opposed to their interests and convictions of expediency.

Nonetheless, the majority of soldiers in the Philippines did not support Bryan. Any mention of the election of 1900 in the soldiers' letters and diaries indicated overwhelming support for the Republican ticket of McKinley and Roosevelt. According to Sergeant Beverly Daley, even the "howling Democrats" favored McKinley. Private Hambleton wrote, "Of course, there are some boys who think Bryan is the whole cheese, but they don't say too much."

Despite Bryan's energetic efforts, the renewed prosperity under McKinley, combined with the public's approval of the Spanish–American War, allowed McKinley to gain a comfortable victory.

=== Results ===
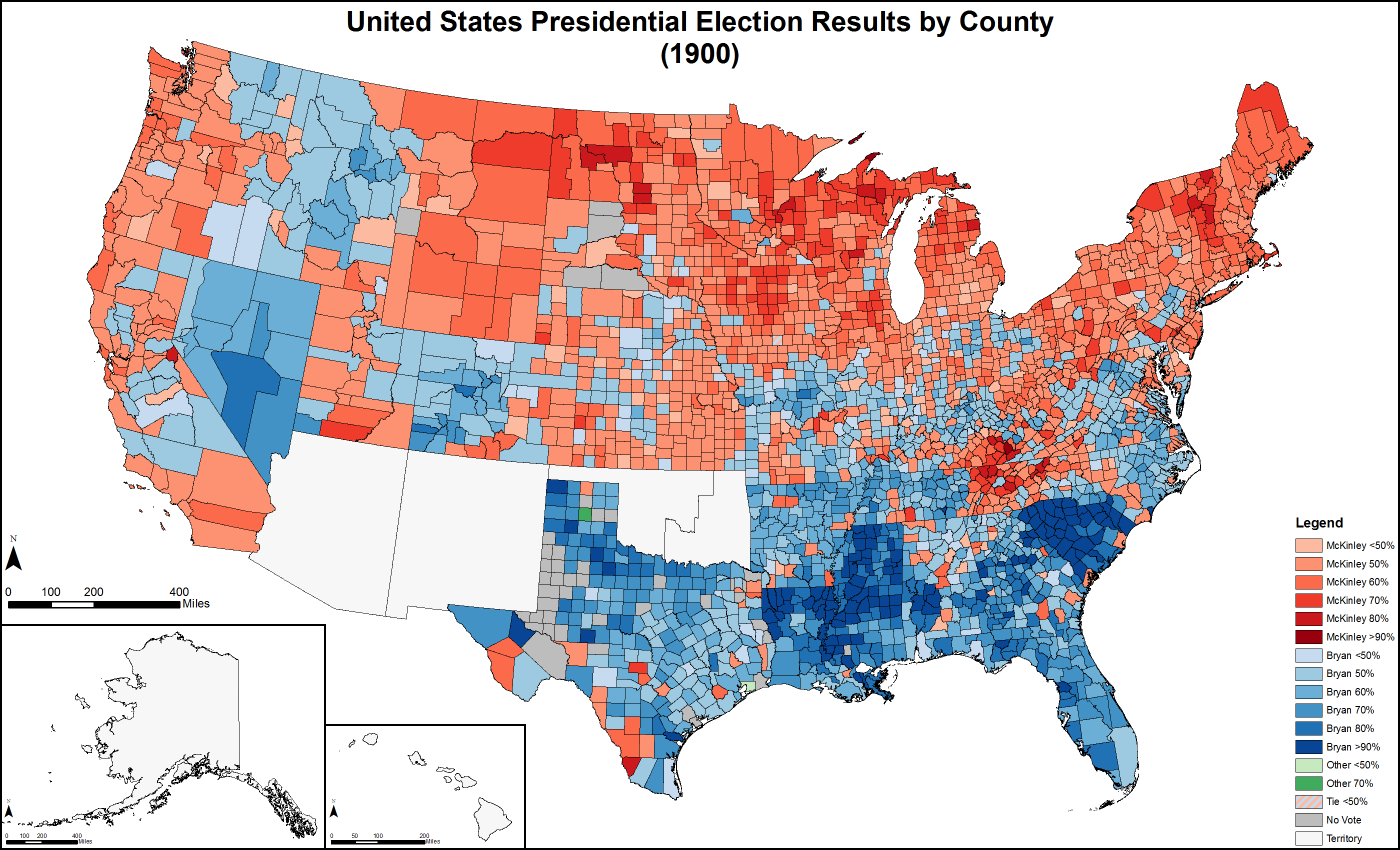
Results by county explicitly indicating the percentage for the winning candidate. Shades of red are for McKinley (Republican), shades of blue are for Bryan (Democratic), and shades of green are for "Other(s)" (Non-Democratic/Non-Republican).

Senators Hanna and Frye During the Campaign to Reelect William McKinley President

Theodore Roosevelt, the vice-presidential candidate on the Republican ticket, attracted unusual attention in the campaign, and it has been commonly asserted that he brought a considerable number of votes to the Republican ticket.

34% of the voting age population and 73.7% of eligible voters participated in the election. McKinley polled roughly 7,200,000 votes. He carried 28 states with a combined 292 electoral votes (65.32%). He slightly increased his national percentage (51.60%) with 120,000 more votes than in 1896. This change is reflected in the gains made in number of counties carried; McKinley had 222 more counties than he had carried in 1896, thus gaining a slight majority of the total number of counties making returns in 1900.

Among the third parties, the Prohibitionists made a recovery from their underwhelming showing four years prior, as prohibition supporters who had voted tactically for McKinley in 1896 returned to the fold. This would be the last time that the party finished third in the popular vote (though they would continue to post respectable fourth and occasionally fifth place finishes until the end of the following decade), as the Socialist Party, who debuted with 0.63% of the popular vote, would emerge as largely the country's strongest third party (outside of Roosevelt's run as a third-party candidate in 1912, as well as that of Robert M. La Follette in 1924) until the end of World War II. The Socialists in fact outpolled the Prohibitionists in three states, and finished closely behind them in several others, but a lack of financial resources and widespread ballot access prevented them from doing better.

Of the 2,729 counties making returns, McKinley won in 1,385 (50.75%) while Bryan carried 1,340 (49.10%). Two counties (0.07%) were split evenly between McKinley and Bryan, while two counties (0.07%) in Texas recorded more votes cast for "Other(s)" than either of the two-party candidates. McKinley had a majority in 1,288 counties while Bryan had a majority in 1,253 counties.

Further examination reveals that changes in counties were even more impressive. Of the 2,729 counties making returns, 2,286 were identical in these two elections; 113 changed from Republican to Democratic; and 328 changed from Democratic to Republican.

A notable feature was the gains Bryan made in the New England and (Northeastern) Mid-Atlantic sections, with also a slight gain in the East North Central section. Bryan even managed to win New York City by almost 30,000 votes when he had lost it by more than 60,000 votes just 4 years earlier. In all other sections, Bryan's vote was less than in 1896, and in the nation his total vote was 23,000 less than in 1896. The percentage of total was 45.52, a slight loss. Kentucky, which he carried this time, showed an increase of 17,005. In 16 states, the Democratic vote increased, but in 29 states it was less than in 1896. Bryan carried only 17 states. This was the only one of his three runs in which he failed to carry his home state of Nebraska.

This was the last election in which the Republicans won the majority of electoral votes in Maryland until 1920. It is also the last election in which a Republican won the presidency without winning Idaho and Montana. In addition, this would also be the last election in 100 years when the Republican candidate would win without earning a minimum of 300 electoral votes. That did not occur again until George W. Bush narrowly defeated Al Gore in the 2000 United States presidential election. This was the first election since 1880 where any party won consecutive elections. This was the first time since 1872 that the winning candidate won by a margin of more than 5 points.

9.27% of McKinley's votes came from the eleven states of the former Confederacy, with him taking 35.54% of the vote in that region. His overall share of the vote in the south rose by 0.24% from the previous election while the share of his vote coming from the south fell from 11.36%.

Electoral results
Presidential candidate	Party	Home state	Popular vote		Electoral vote	Running mate		
Presidential candidate	Party	Home state	Count	Percentage	Electoral vote	Vice-presidential candidate	Home state	Electoral vote
William McKinley (incumbent)	Republican	Ohio	7,228,864	51.64%	292	Theodore Roosevelt	New York	292
William Jennings Bryan	Democratic	Nebraska	6,370,932	45.52%	155	Adlai Stevenson I	Illinois	155
John G. Woolley	Prohibition	Illinois	210,864	1.51%	0	Henry B. Metcalf	Rhode Island	0
Eugene V. Debs	Social Democratic	Indiana	87,945	0.63%	0	Job Harriman	California	0
Wharton Barker	Populist	Pennsylvania	50,989	0.36%	0	Ignatius L. Donnelly	Minnesota	0
Joseph F. Malloney	Socialist Labor	Massachusetts	40,943	0.29%	0	Valentine Remmel	Pennsylvania	0
Other			6,889	0.05%	—	Other		—
Total			13,997,426	100%	447			447
Needed to win					224			224

Source (popular vote): Leip, David. "1900 Presidential Election Results". Dave Leip's Atlas of U.S. Presidential Elections.

Source (electoral vote): "Electoral College Box Scores 1789–1996". National Archives and Records Administration.

Popular vote
McKinley	51.64%
Bryan	45.52%
Woolley	1.51%
Debs	0.63%
Barker	0.36%
Others	0.34%

Electoral vote
McKinley	65.32%
Bryan	34.68%

=== Geography of results ===
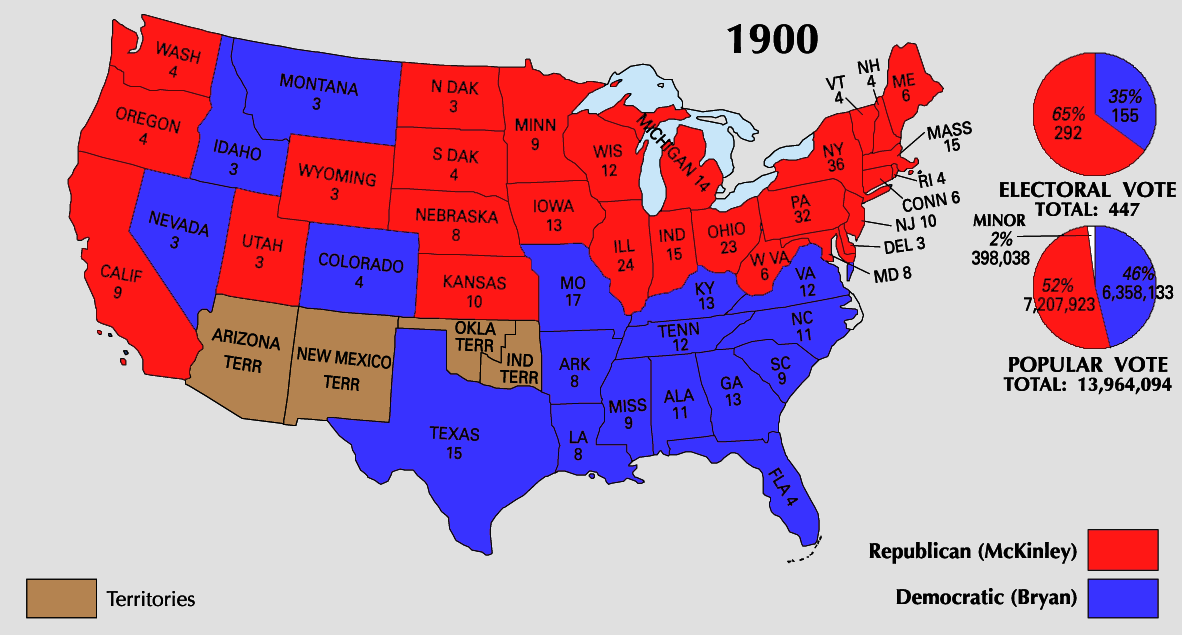

Results by county, shaded according to winning candidate's percentage of the vote

==== Cartographic gallery ====
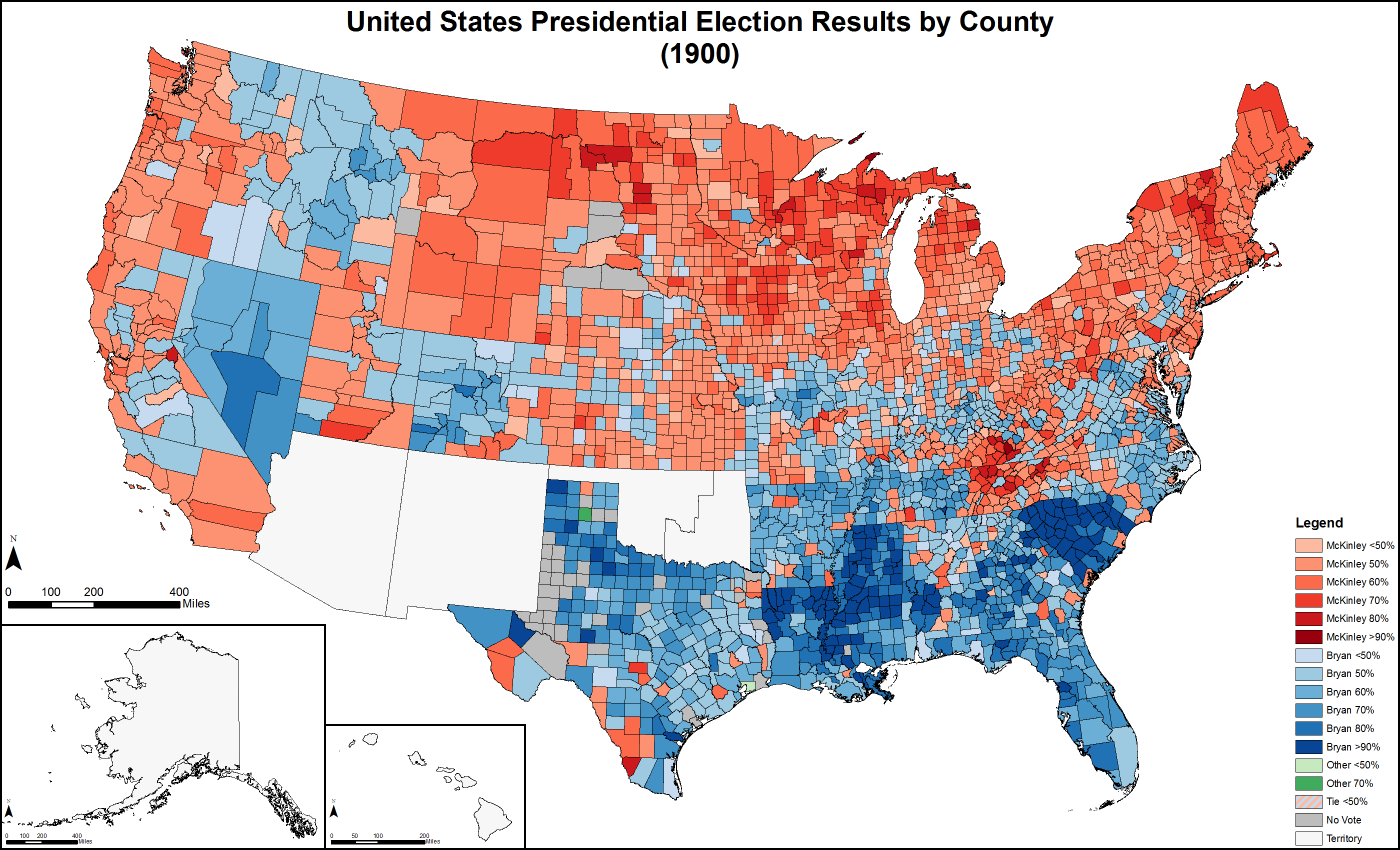
Map of presidential election results by county

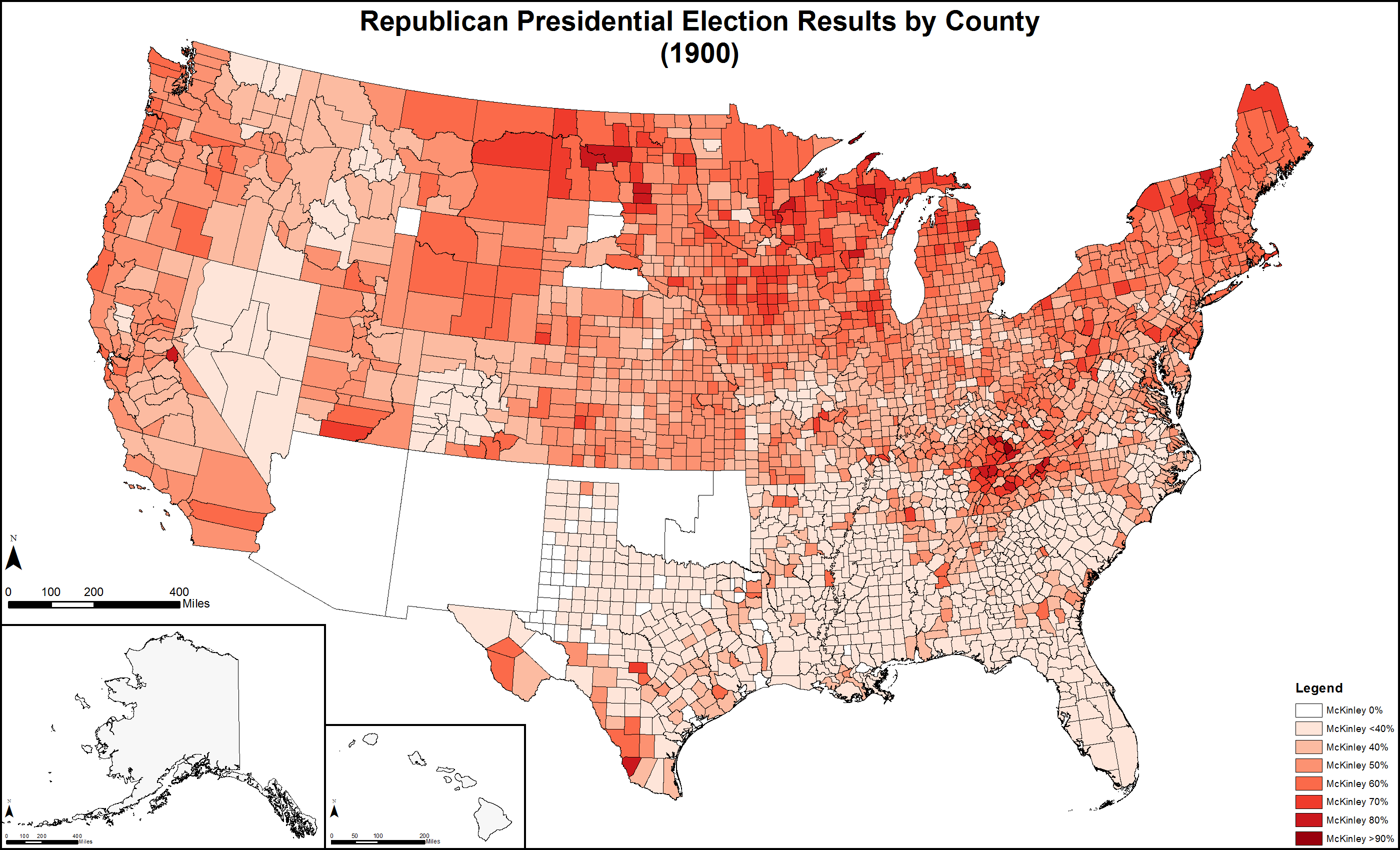
Map of Republican presidential election results by county

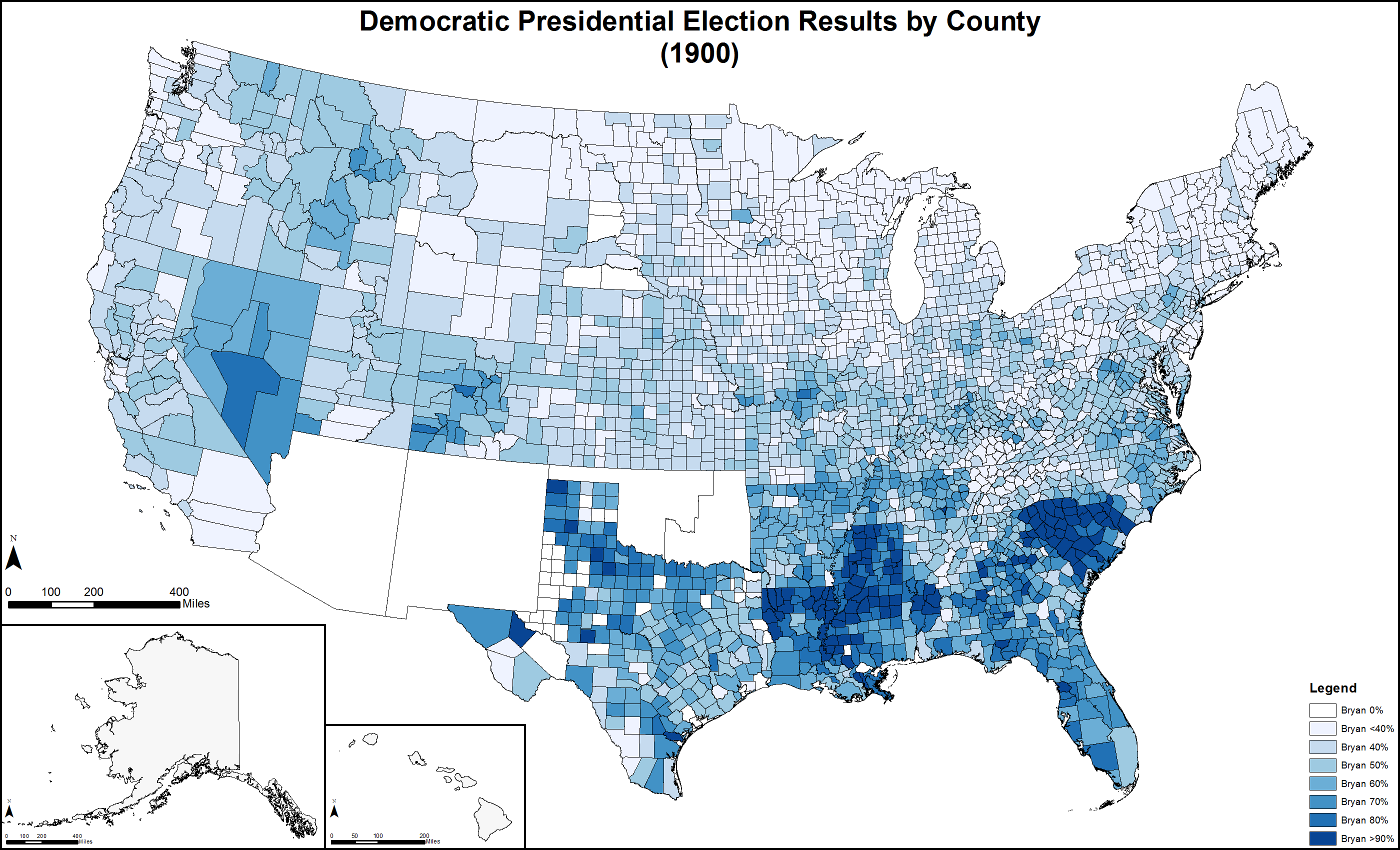
Map of Democratic presidential election results by county

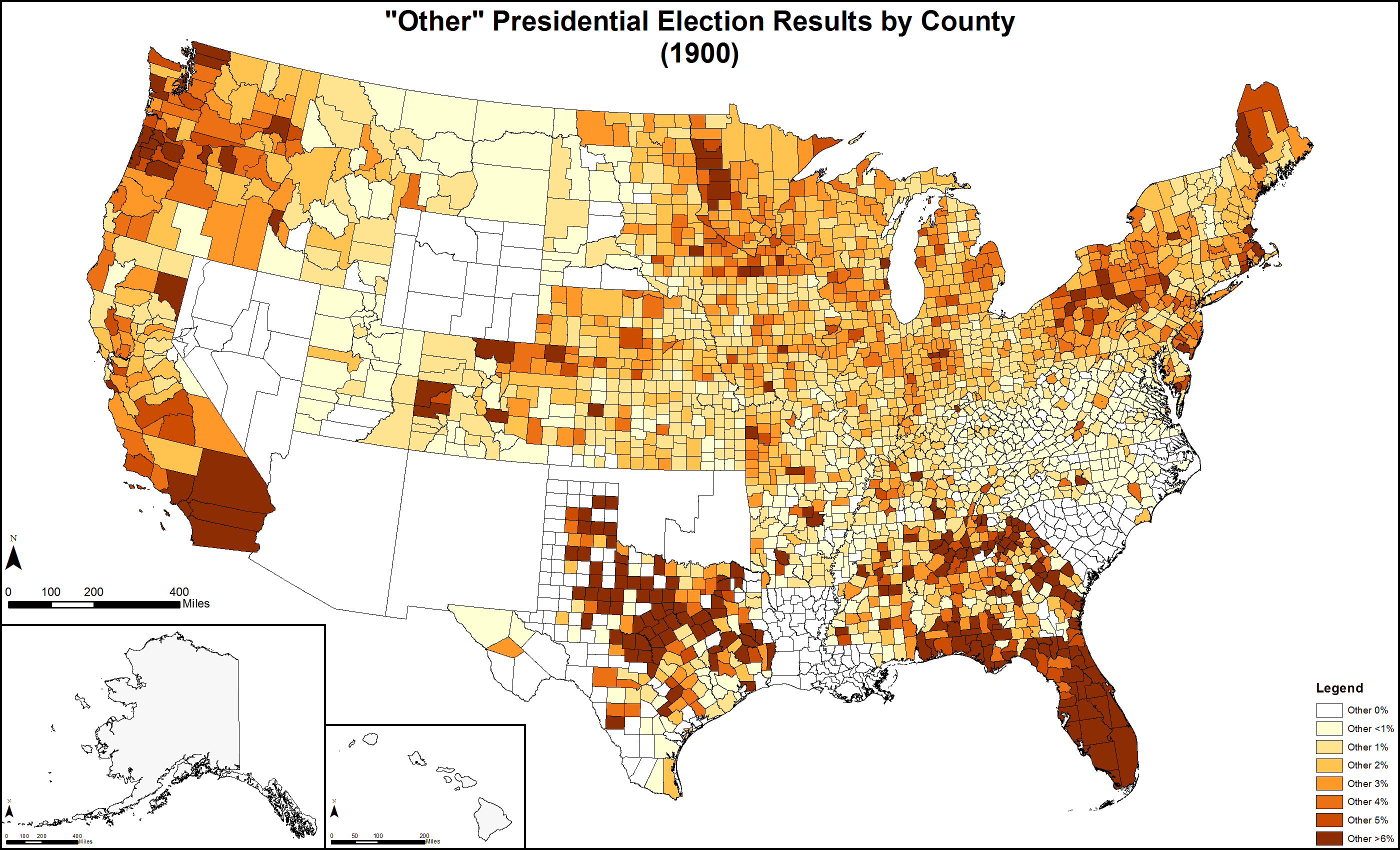
Map of "other" presidential election results by county

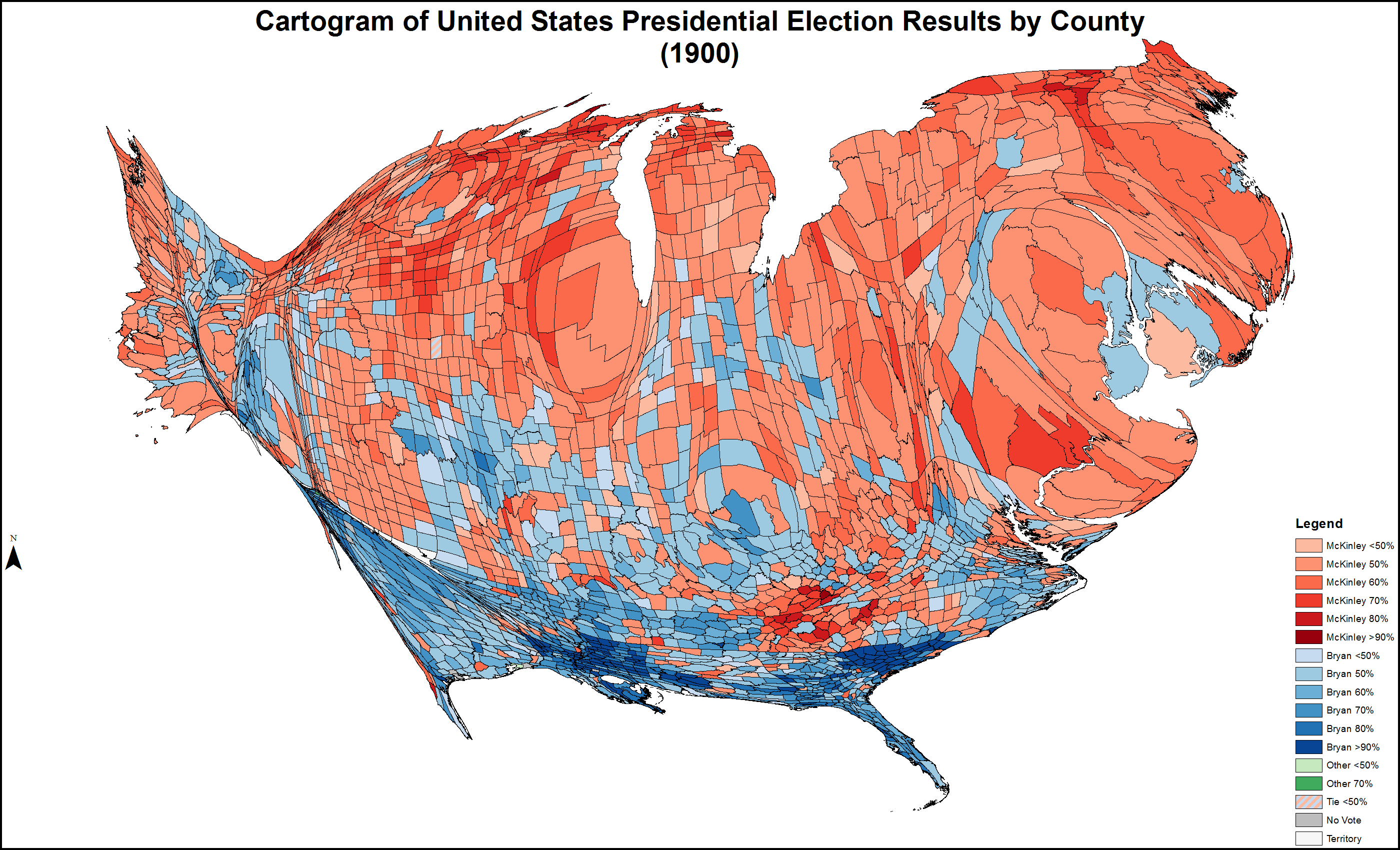
Cartogram of presidential election results by county

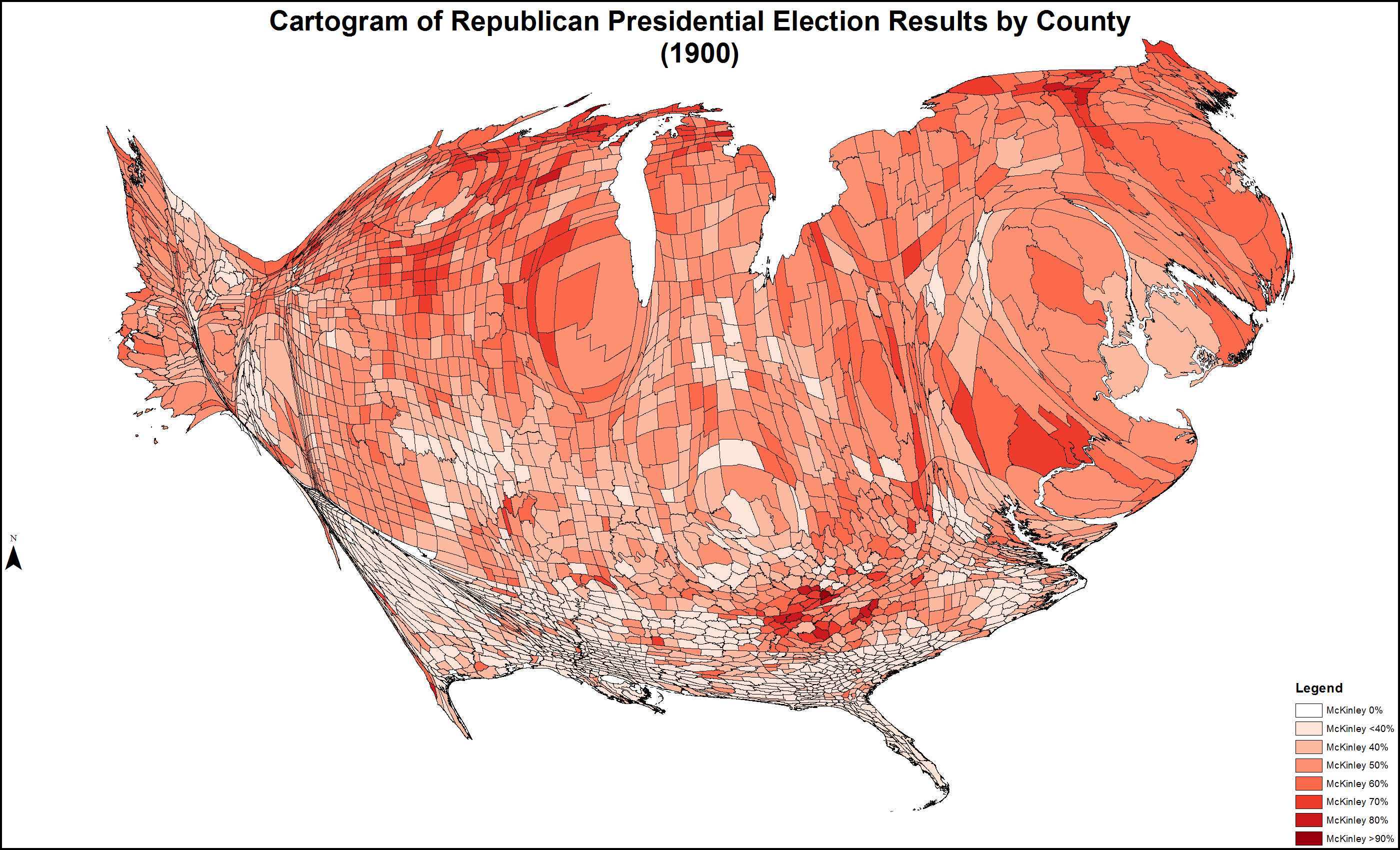
Cartogram of Republican presidential election results by county

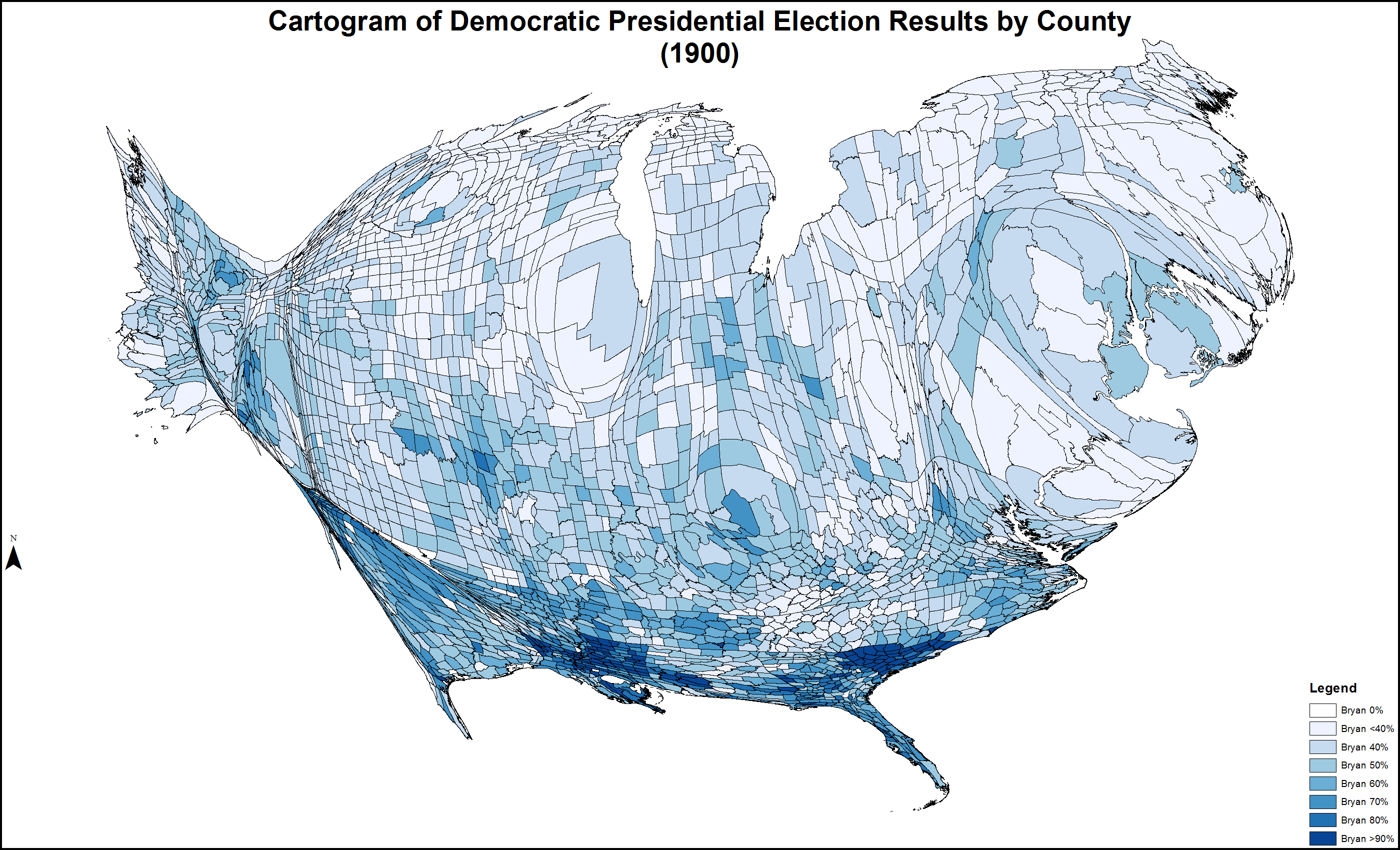
Cartogram of Democratic presidential election results by county

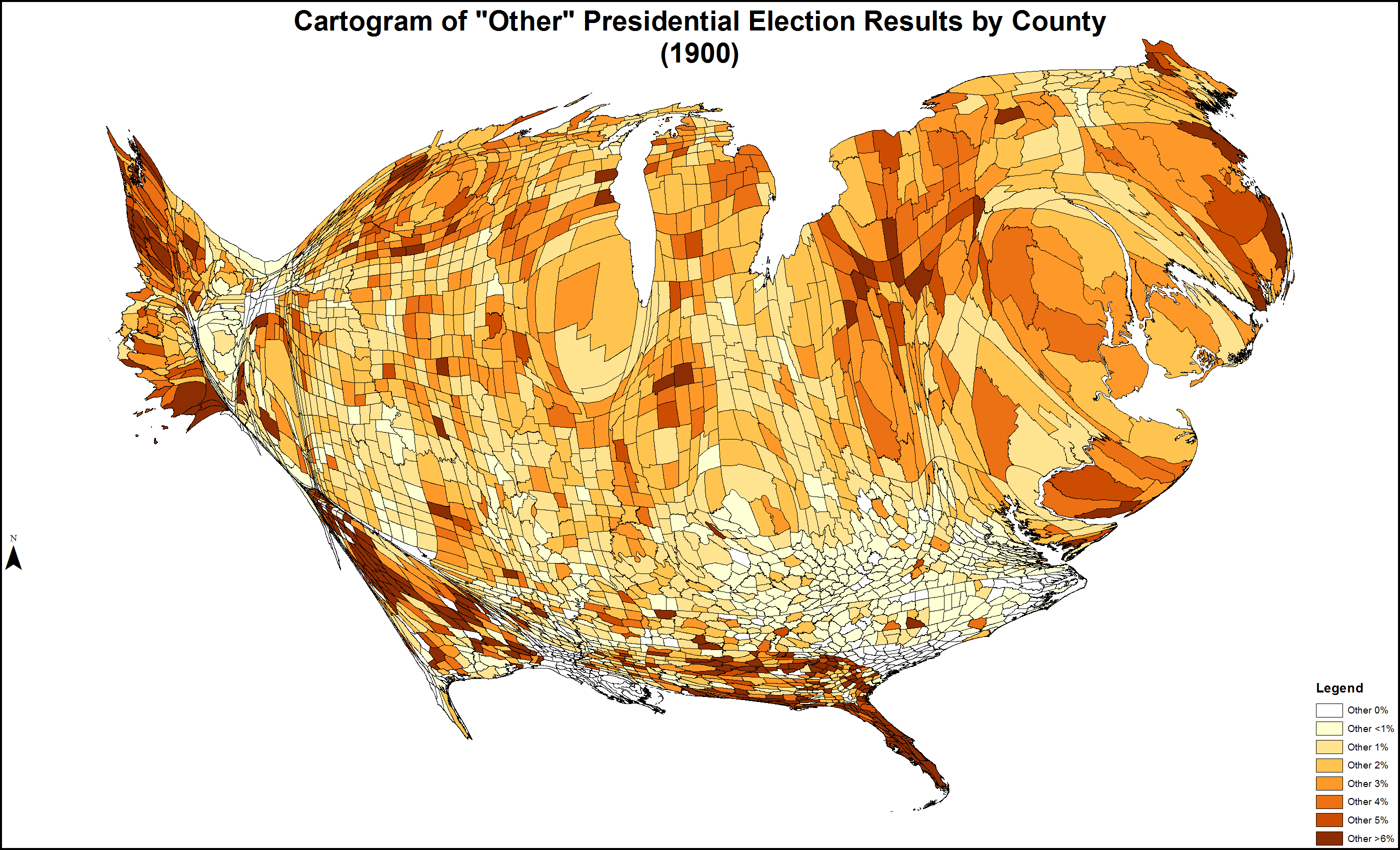
Cartogram of "other" presidential election results by county

=== Results by state ===
States/districts won by Bryan/Stevenson
States/districts won by McKinley/Roosevelt

		William McKinley Republican			William Jennings Bryan Democratic			John Woolley Prohibition			Eugene V. Debs Social Democratic			Wharton Barker Populist			Joseph F. Malloney Socialist Labor			Margin		State Total	
State	electoral votes	#	%	electoral votes	#	%	electoral votes	#	%	electoral votes	#	%	electoral votes	#	%	electoral votes	#	%	electoral votes	#	%	#	
Alabama	11	55,612	34.82	-	97,129	60.82	11	2,763	1.73	-	-	-	-	4,188	2.62	-	-	-	-	-41,517	-26.00	159,692	AL
Arkansas	8	44,800	35.04	-	81,142	63.46	8	584	0.46	-	-	-	-	972	0.76	-	-	-	-	-36,342	-28.42	127,866	AR
California	9	164,755	54.50	9	124,985	41.34	-	5,024	1.66	-	-	-	-	-	-	-	7,554	2.50	-	39,770	13.16	302,318	CA
Colorado	4	93,072	42.04	-	122,733	55.43	4	3,790	1.71	-	714	0.32	-	389	0.18	-	684	0.31	-	-29,661	-13.39	221,408	CO
Connecticut	6	102,572	56.92	6	74,014	41.07	-	1,617	0.90	-	1,029	0.57	-	-	-	-	908	0.50	-	28,558	15.85	180,195	CT
Delaware	3	22,535	53.67	3	18,852	44.90	-	546	1.30	-	56	0.13	-	-	-	-	-	-	-	3,683	8.77	41,989	DE
Florida	4	7,355	18.55	-	28,273	71.31	4	2,244	5.66	-	634	1.60	-	1,143	2.88	-	-	-	-	-20,918	-52.76	39,649	FL
Georgia	13	34,260	28.22	-	81,180	66.86	13	1,402	1.15	-	-	-	-	4,568	3.76	-	-	-	-	-46,920	-38.64	121,410	GA
Idaho	3	27,198	46.96	-	29,414	50.79	3	857	1.48	-	-	-	-	445	0.77	-	-	-	-	-2,216	-3.83	57,914	ID
Illinois	24	597,985	52.83	24	503,061	44.44	-	17,626	1.56	-	9,687	0.86	-	1,141	0.10	-	1,373	0.12	-	94,924	8.39	1,131,897	IL
Indiana	15	336,063	50.60	15	309,584	46.62	-	13,718	2.07	-	2,374	0.36	-	1,438	0.22	-	663	0.10	-	26,479	3.98	664,094	IN
Iowa	13	307,808	58.04	13	209,265	39.46	-	9,502	1.79	-	2,742	0.52	-	613	0.12	-	259	0.05	-	98,543	18.58	530,355	IA
Kansas	10	185,955	52.56	10	162,601	45.96	-	3,605	1.02	-	1,605	0.45	-	-	-	-	-	-	-	23,354	6.60	353,766	KS
Kentucky	13	227,132	48.51	-	235,126	50.21	13	2,890	0.62	-	766	0.16	-	1,961	0.42	-	390	0.08	-	-7,994	-1.70	468,265	KY
Louisiana	8	14,234	20.96	-	53,668	79.03	8	-	-	-	-	-	-	-	-	-	-	-	-	-39,434	-58.07	67,906	LA
Maine	6	65,412	61.89	6	36,822	34.84	-	2,581	2.44	-	878	0.83	-	-	-	-	-	-	-	28,590	27.05	105,693	ME
Maryland	8	136,185	51.50	8	122,238	46.23	-	4,574	1.73	-	904	0.34	-	-	-	-	388	0.15	-	13,947	5.27	264,434	MD
Massachusetts	15	238,866	57.59	15	156,997	37.85	-	6,202	1.50	-	9,607	2.32	-	-	-	-	2,599	0.63	-	81,869	19.74	414,804	MA
Michigan	14	316,269	58.10	14	211,685	38.89	-	11,859	2.18	-	2,826	0.52	-	903	0.17	-	837	0.15	-	104,584	19.21	544,379	MI
Minnesota	9	190,461	60.21	9	112,901	35.69	-	8,555	2.70	-	3,065	0.97	-	-	-	-	1,329	0.42	-	77,560	24.52	316,311	MN
Mississippi	9	5,707	9.66	-	51,706	87.56	9	-	-	-	-	-	-	1,642	2.78	-	-	-	-	-45,999	-77.90	59,055	MS
Missouri	17	314,092	45.94	-	351,922	51.48	17	5,965	0.87	-	6,139	0.90	-	4,244	0.62	-	1,294	0.19	-	-37,830	-5.54	683,656	MO
Montana	3	25,409	39.79	-	37,311	58.43	3	306	0.48	-	711	1.11	-	-	-	-	119	0.19	-	-11,902	-18.64	63,856	MT
Nebraska	8	121,835	50.46	8	114,013	47.22	-	3,655	1.51	-	823	0.34	-	1,104	0.46	-	-	-	-	7,822	3.24	241,430	NE
Nevada	3	3,849	37.75	-	6,347	62.25	3	-	-	-	-	-	-	-	-	-	-	-	-	-2,498	-24.50	10,196	NV
New Hampshire	4	54,799	59.33	4	35,489	38.42	-	1,270	1.37	-	790	0.86	-	-	-	-	-	-	-	19,310	20.91	92,364	NH
New Jersey	10	221,707	55.28	10	164,808	41.09	-	7,183	1.79	-	4,609	1.15	-	669	0.17	-	2,074	0.52	-	56,899	14.19	401,050	NJ
New York	36	822,013	53.10	36	678,462	43.83	-	22,077	1.43	-	12,869	0.83	-	-	-	-	12,621	0.82	-	143,551	9.27	1,548,042	NY
North Carolina	11	132,997	45.47	-	157,733	53.92	11	990	0.34	-	-	-	-	798	0.27	-	-	-	-	-24,736	-8.45	292,518	NC
North Dakota	3	35,898	62.12	3	20,531	35.53	-	731	1.26	-	520	0.90	-	111	0.19	-	-	-	-	13,141	26.59	57,791	ND
Ohio	23	543,918	52.30	23	474,882	45.66	-	10,203	0.98	-	4,847	0.47	-	251	0.02	-	1,688	0.16	-	69,036	6.64	1,040,073	OH
Oregon	4	46,172	55.46	4	32,810	39.41	-	2,536	3.05	-	1,464	1.76	-	269	0.32	-	-	-	-	13,362	16.05	83,251	OR
Pennsylvania	32	712,665	60.74	32	424,232	36.16	-	27,908	2.38	-	4,831	0.41	-	638	0.05	-	2,936	0.25	-	288,433	24.58	1,173,210	PA
Rhode Island	4	33,784	59.74	4	19,812	35.04	-	1,529	2.70	-	-	-	-	-	-	-	1,423	2.52	-	13,972	24.70	56,548	RI
South Carolina	9	3,579	7.04	-	47,233	92.96	9	-	-	-	-	-	-	-	-	-	-	-	-	-43,654	-85.92	50,812	SC
South Dakota	4	54,530	56.73	4	39,544	41.14	-	1,542	1.60	-	169	0.18	-	339	0.35	-	-	-	-	14,986	15.59	96,124	SD
Tennessee	12	123,108	44.95	-	145,240	53.03	12	3,844	1.40	-	346	0.13	-	1,322	0.48	-	-	-	-	-22,132	-8.08	273,860	TN
Texas	15	130,641	30.83	-	267,432	63.12	15	2,644	0.62	-	1,846	0.44	-	20,981	4.95	-	162	0.04	-	-136,791	-32.29	423,706	TX
Utah	3	47,139	50.58	3	45,006	48.30	-	209	0.22	-	720	0.77	-	-	-	-	106	0.11	-	2,133	2.28	93,189	UT
Vermont	4	42,569	75.73	4	12,849	22.86	-	383	0.68	-	39	0.07	-	367	0.65	-	-	-	-	29,720	52.87	56,212	VT
Virginia	12	115,769	43.82	-	146,079	55.29	12	2,130	0.81	-	-	-	-	63	0.02	-	167	0.06	-	-30,310	-11.47	264,208	VA
Washington	4	57,456	53.44	4	44,833	41.70	-	2,363	2.20	-	2,006	1.87	-	-	-	-	866	0.81	-	12,623	11.74	107,524	WA
West Virginia	6	119,829	54.27	6	98,807	44.75	-	1,628	0.74	-	286	0.13	-	246	0.11	-	-	-	-	21,022	9.52	220,796	WV
Wisconsin	12	265,760	60.06	12	159,163	35.97	-	10,027	2.27	-	7,048	1.59	-	-	-	-	503	0.11	-	106,597	24.09	442,501	WI
Wyoming	3	14,482	58.66	3	10,164	41.17	-	-	-	-	21	0.09	-	20	0.08	-	-	-	-	4,318	17.49	24,687	WY
TOTALS:	447	7,228,864	51.64	292	6,370,932	45.52	155	210,867	1.51	-	87,945	0.63	-	50,989	0.36	-	40,943	0.29	-	857,932	6.12	13,997,429	US

=== States that flipped from Democratic to Republican ===
- Nebraska
- South Dakota
- Utah
- Washington
- Wyoming
- Kansas

=== States that flipped from Republican to Democratic ===
- Kentucky

=== Close states ===
Margin of victory less than 5% (42 electoral votes):

1. Kentucky, 1.71% (7,994 votes)
2. Utah, 2.29% (2,133 votes)
3. Nebraska, 3.24% (7,822 votes)
4. Idaho, 3.83% (2,216 votes)
5. Indiana, 3.99% (26,479 votes)

Margin of victory between 5% and 10% (150 electoral votes):

1. Maryland, 5.27% (13,947 votes)
2. Missouri, 5.53% (37,830 votes)
3. Kansas, 6.60% (23,354 votes)
4. Ohio, 6.64% (69,036 votes)
5. Tennessee, 8.08% (22,132 votes)
6. Illinois, 8.39% (94,924 votes) (tipping point state)
7. North Carolina, 8.46% (24,736 votes)
8. Delaware, 8.77% (3,683 votes)
9. New York, 9.27% (143,551 votes)
10. West Virginia, 9.52% (21,022 votes)

==== Statistics ====
Counties with highest percent of vote (Republican)

1. Keweenaw County, Michigan 92.24%
2. Leslie County, Kentucky 91.23%
3. Unicoi County, Tennessee 89.64%
4. Scott County, Tennessee 89.59%
5. Johnson County, Tennessee 89.20%

Counties with highest percent of vote (Democratic)

1. Irion County, Texas 100.00%
2. Hampton County, South Carolina 99.89%
3. Greenwood County, South Carolina 99.73%
4. Saluda County, South Carolina 99.45%
5. Abbeville County, South Carolina 99.42%

Counties with highest percent of vote (Other)

1. Carson County, Texas 78.71%
2. Chambers County, Texas 44.50%
3. Comanche County, Texas 32.82%
4. Franklin County, Georgia 30.92%
5. Scurry County, Texas 28.69%

Counties with lowest percent of vote (Republican)

1. Randall County, Texas 00.00%
2. Irion County, Texas 00.00%
3. Hampton County, South Carolina 00.11%
4. Greenwood County, South Carolina 00.27%
5. Dooly County, Georgia 00.35%

Counties with lowest percent of vote (Democratic)

1. Keweenaw County, Michigan 06.33%
2. Unicoi County, Tennessee 08.29%
3. Leslie County, Kentucky 08.46%
4. Scott County, Tennessee 10.23%
5. Johnson County, Tennessee 10.42%

Counties with most votes (Republican)

1. Cook County, Illinois 203,760
2. Philadelphia County, Pennsylvania 173,657
3. New York County, New York 153,001
4. Kings County, New York 108,977
5. Allegheny County, Pennsylvania 71,780

Counties with most votes (Democratic)

1. Cook County, Illinois 186,193
2. New York County, New York 181,786
3. Kings County, New York 106,232
4. Philadelphia County, Pennsylvania 58,179
5. Suffolk County, Massachusetts 47,534

Counties with most votes (Other)

1. New York County, New York 11,700
2. Cook County, Illinois 10,242
3. Milwaukee County, Wisconsin 5,857
4. Kings County, New York 4,639
5. Essex County, Massachusetts 4,242

Counties with lowest percent of vote and win (Republican)

1. Cherokee County, Alabama 41.94%
2. Paulding County, Georgia 46.00%
3. Logan County, Colorado 46.59%
4. Chattahoochee County, Georgia 47.18%
5. Otter Tail County, Minnesota 47.19%

Counties with lowest percent of vote and win (Democratic)

1. Murray County, Georgia 45.18%
2. Geneva County, Alabama 46.48%
3. Douglas County, Georgia 46.75%
4. Linn County, Oregon 46.77%
5. Fresno County, California 47.41%

== See also ==
- History of the United States (1865–1918)
- Newspaper endorsements in the 1900 United States presidential election
- 1900 United States House of Representatives elections
- 1900–01 United States Senate elections
- Second inauguration of William McKinley

== Bibliography ==
=== Secondary sources ===
- Willis J. Abbot et al.: The Battle of 1900; an official hand-book for every American citizen
- Abramson, Paul; Aldrich, John; Rohde, David (1995). Change and Continuity in the 1992 Elections. CQ Press. ISBN 0871878399.
- Bailey, John W. Jr. (1973). "The Presidential Election of 1900 in Nebraska: McKinley over Bryan". Nebraska History. 54 (4): 561–584. ISSN 0028-1859.
- Bailey, Thomas A. (1937). "Was the Presidential Election of 1900 a Mandate on Imperialism?". Mississippi Valley Historical Review. 24 (1): 43–52. doi:10.2307/1891336. JSTOR 1891336.
- Coletta, Paolo E. (1964). William Jennings Bryan. Vol. 1. Lincoln: University of Nebraska Press. ISBN 0-8032-4050-3.
- Fahey, James J. "Building Populist Discourse: An Analysis of Populist Communication in American Presidential Elections, 1896–2016." Social Science Quarterly 102.4 (2021): 1268–1288. online
- Gould, Lewis L. (1980). The Presidency of William McKinley. Lawrence: Regents Press of Kansas. ISBN 0-7006-0206-2.
- Harrington, Fred H. (1935). "The Anti-Imperialist Movement in the United States, 1898–1900". Mississippi Valley Historical Review. 22 (2): 211–230. doi:10.2307/1898467. JSTOR 1898467.
- Hilpert, John M. (2015) American Cyclone: Theodore Roosevelt and His 1900 Whistle-Stop Campaign (U Press of Mississippi, 2015). xii, 349 pp.
- Kent, Noel Jacob (2000). America in 1900. Armonk, NY: M.E. Sharpe. ISBN 0-7656-0595-3.
- Miller, Stuart Creighton (1982). Benevolent Assimilation: The American Conquest of the Philippines, 1899–1903. New Haven: Yale University Press. ISBN 0-300-03081-9.
- Morgan, H. Wayne (1963). William McKinley and His America. Syracuse: Syracuse University Press. ISBN 0-87338-765-1.
- Morgan, H. Wayne (1966). "William McKinley as a Political Leader". Review of Politics. 28 (4): 417–432. doi:10.1017/S0034670500013188. JSTOR 1405280. S2CID 145544412.
- Schlup, Leonard (1986). "In the Shadow of Bryan: Adlai E. Stevenson and the Resurgence of Conservatism at the 1900 Convention". Nebraska History. 67 (3): 224–238. ISSN 0028-1859.
- Schlup, Leonard (1991). "The American Chameleon: Adlai E. Stevenson and the Quest for the Vice Presidency in Gilded Age Politics". Presidential Studies Quarterly. 21 (3): 511–529. ISSN 0360-4918.
- Sherman, Richard (1973). The Republican Party and Black America From McKinley to Hoover 1896-1933. University of Virginia Press. ISBN 0813904676.
- Tompkins, E. Berkeley (1967). "Scilla and Charybdis: the Anti-imperialist Dilemma in the Election of 1900". Pacific Historical Review. 36 (2): 143–161. doi:10.2307/3636719. ISSN 0030-8684. JSTOR 3636719.

=== Primary sources ===
- Bryan, William Jennings. "The Election of 1900," pp. 788–801 Bryan gives his analysis of why he lost
- Stevenson, Adlai E., et al. "Bryan or McKinley? The Present Duty of American Citizens," The North American Review Vol. 171, No. 527 (Oct. 1900), pp. 433–516 in JSTOR political statements by politicians on all sides, including Adlai E. Stevenson, B. R. Tillman, Edward M. Shepard, Richard Croker, Erving Winslow, Charles Emory Smith, G. F. Hoar, T. C. Platt, W. M. Stewart, Andrew Carnegie, and James H. Eckels
- Chester, Edward W A guide to political platforms (1977) online
- Porter, Kirk H. and Donald Bruce Johnson, eds. National party platforms, 1840-1964 (1965) online 1840-1956
