= 1908 United States presidential election in Massachusetts =

- November 3, 1908
- Turnout: 65.1% ▼2.5 pp

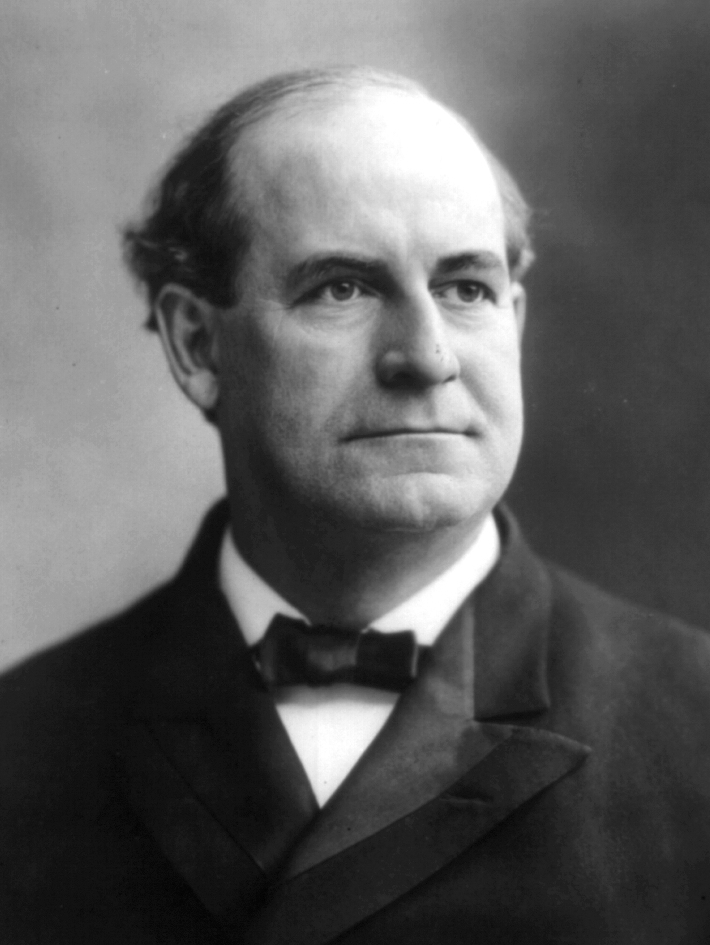
Nominee	William Howard Taft	William Jennings Bryan
Party	Republican	Democratic
Home state	Ohio	Nebraska
Running mate	James S. Sherman	John W. Kern
Electoral vote	16	0
Popular vote	265,966	155,543
Percentage	58.21%	34.04%

Taft
40–50%
50–60%
60–70%
70–80%
80–90%
90–100%
Bryan
40–50%
50–60%
60–70%
President before election
Theodore Roosevelt
Republican
Elected President
William Howard Taft
Republican

The 1908 United States presidential election in Massachusetts took place on November 3, 1908, as part of the 1908 United States presidential election. Voters chose 16 representatives, or electors to the Electoral College, who voted for president and vice president.

Massachusetts overwhelmingly voted for the Republican nominees, Secretary of War William Howard Taft of Ohio and his running mate James S. Sherman of New York. They defeated the Democratic nominees, former U.S. Representative William Jennings Bryan of Nebraska and his running mate John W. Kern of Indiana. Taft won the state by a margin of 24.17%.

Taft was able to win every county in the state of Massachusetts, including a rare Republican victory in Suffolk County, home to the state's capital and largest city, Boston, although Bryan did narrowly win the city of Boston. Bryan had previously lost Suffolk County in 1896 but won it in his rematch with William McKinley in 1900. Bryan had also previously lost Massachusetts to McKinley in both 1896 and 1900, respectively.

This was the last election in which the town of Hyde Park participated in, as it was annexed by the city of Boston in 1912, ahead of that year's election.

== Results ==
1908 United States presidential election in Massachusetts
Party	Candidate	Running mate	Popular vote		Electoral vote	
Party	Candidate	Running mate	Count	%	Count	%
Republican	William Howard Taft of Ohio	James Schoolcraft Sherman of New York	265,966	58.21%	16	100.00%
Democratic	William Jennings Bryan of Nebraska	John Worth Kern of Indiana	155,543	34.04%	0	0.00%
Independence	Thomas Louis Hisgen of Massachusetts	John Temple Graves of Georgia	19,237	4.21%	0	0.00%
Socialist	Eugene Victor Debs of Indiana	Ben Hanford of New York	10,779	2.36%	0	0.00%
Prohibition	Eugene Wilder Chafin of Illinois	Aaron Sherman Watkins of Ohio	4,374	0.96%	0	0.00%
Socialist Labor	August Gillhaus of New York	Donald L. Munro of Virginia	1,011	0.21%	0	0.00%
N/A	Others	Others	9	0.01%	0	0.00%
Total			456,919	100.00%	16	100.00%

== See also ==
- United States presidential elections in Massachusetts
