= Archibald M. Howe =

American lawyer and historian (1848–1916)

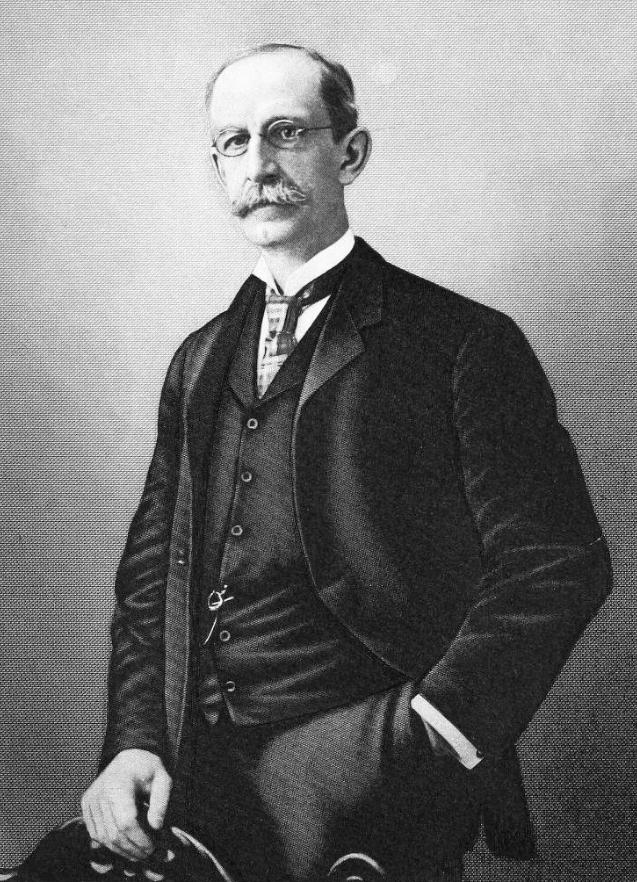

Archibald Murray Howe (May 20, 1848 – January 6, 1916) was an American lawyer and historian. In 1900, he was named as the Vice-Presidential candidate of the short-lived "National Party".

== Life and career ==
Born in Northampton, Massachusetts, on May 20, 1848, Howe was of pilgrim ancestry. He grew up in the Boston suburb of Brookline, where he attended a local academy. He graduated from Harvard University in 1869, and, three years later, graduated from the Harvard University School of Law. He served as the private secretary to Republican Henry Lillie Pierce (1825–1896) when the latter was elected to the US House of Representatives in 1872, remaining so until 1877, when Pierce left Congress. Later, Howe served as a member of the School Committee and the Common Council in Cambridge, where he had moved after returning to Massachusetts.

A Republican in politics, who had broken from the party in 1884 to support Democrat Grover Cleveland, Howe argued against the foreign policies of Republican President William McKinley, which Howe and others saw as imperialist. To this end, in 1900 a group of like-minded people met at Carnegie Hall in New York City on September 5, 1900 and formed the National Party as a protest against McKinley. They nominated Donelson Caffery of Louisiana, a US Senator and Democrat, for President and Howe for Vice President. Caffery had not asked to be nominated by a party other than his own, and he quickly withdrew; Howe followed, and the party merely asked its followers nationwide to vote for the party's electors as a protest vote. Few votes were received.

Howe spent much of his life doing historical research; reading and writing papers on history. He was a member of the Massachusetts Reform Club, and there in 1900 read a paper which denounced imperialism and the "spirit of empire". His obituary in The Boston Globe stated that he was "a brilliant, forceful speaker".

In his final years, Howe was in declining health. On the morning of January 6, 1916, two policemen found Howe, stumbling around in the street, barefoot and in his night-clothes. He was covered in blood, and police found a stab wound to his neck and a large bruise on his head. Taken to the hospital, Howe died later that morning. A search of his home showed the wounds to be self-inflicted. He was buried at Mount Auburn Cemetery. At the time of his death, he was married to Arria Sargeant Dixwell, whom he married in 1881.
