= Valentine Remmel =

American politician

Valentine Remmel (March 9, 1853 - May 9, 1929) was a member of the Socialist Labor Party of America (SLP) from Pittsburgh, Pennsylvania who was nominated for Vice President of the United States on the SLP ticket in 1900. Before that, he had been a candidate for the Presidential nomination, but was defeated by his later running mate, Joseph F. Malloney. A glass blower by profession and active in the labor movement, he left the SLP later between 1901 and 1910.

Remmel was the later also the SLP nominee for judge of the Pennsylvania Superior Court.
