= Joseph F. Malloney =

American machinist and political organizer

- Born: Joseph Francis Maloney
- Occupations: Machinist; political organizer
- Political party: Socialist Labor

Joseph Francis Maloney was an American machinist and political organizer from Massachusetts. An organizer with the Massachusetts-branch of the Socialist Labor Party of America, he ran for office several times with the SLP, including for Congress in Massachusetts's 7th congressional district in 1898 and for President in the 1900 election.

== Presidential election of 1900 ==
Prominent SLP leaders including Morris Hillquit and Henry Slobodin split from the SLP in 1899 and supported the Social Democratic Party of America's ticket headed by Eugene V. Debs. Despite this, Malloney and running mate Valentine Remmel of Pennsylvania were nominated to head the SLP ticket.

The Malloney/Remmel ticket received 41,000 votes over 23 states in the 1900 election, representing an increase in votes for the Socialist Labor Party.
