= List of presidential nominating conventions in the United States =

These lists are a companion to the Wikipedia article entitled United States presidential nominating convention.

== Significant third-party conventions before 1860 ==
Elec- tion	Party	City	Year	Presidential nominee	Notes
1832	Anti-Masonic	Baltimore, Maryland	1831	William Wirt & Amos Ellmaker	usually considered the first U.S. political party nominating convention
1836	Anti-Masonic	Philadelphia	1836	no candidate nominated	
1840	Anti-Masonic	Philadelphia	1838	William Henry Harrison (Whig)	By 1840, Anti-Masons had been largely absorbed into the Whig Party
1840	Liberty	Albany, New York	1840	James G. Birney & Thomas Earle	first U.S. anti-slavery political party
1844	Liberty	Buffalo, New York	1843	James G. Birney & Thomas Morris*	*(Morris died on December 7, 1844)
1844	Tyler Democratic	Baltimore	1844	John Tyler	Nominated sitting President Tyler in May 1844 but Tyler withdrew from running in August 1844. [Also known as the National Democratic or Democratic Republican Party]
1848	Free Soil	Utica & Buffalo, New York	1848	Martin Van Buren & Charles Francis Adams Sr.	united Liberty Party supporters with anti-slavery Democrats and Whigs
1852	Free Soil	Pittsburgh, Pennsylvania	1852	John P. Hale & George Washington Julian	Most Free-Soilers joined the Republican Party after its foundation in 1854.
1856	American	Philadelphia	1856	Millard Fillmore (Whig) & Andrew Donelson	The anti-immigrant American (or Know Nothing) Party endorsed Fillmore in February 1856, followed by the Whigs in September.

== Major-party conventions ==
The two right-hand columns show nominations by notable conventions not shown elsewhere. Some of the nominees (e.g. the Whigs before 1860 and Theodore Roosevelt in 1912) received very large votes, while others who received less than 1% of the total national popular vote are listed to show historical continuity or transition. [For example, the Equal Rights Party convention of 1872 nominated the first national ticket to include either a woman (Victoria Woodhull) or an African-American (Frederick Douglass), although this ticket received no votes at all.]

Many important candidacies are not shown here because they were never endorsed by a national party convention (for example, those of William Henry Harrison in 1836, George C. Wallace in 1968, John B. Anderson in 1980 and Ross Perot in 1992); for a list by year of all notable candidates (at least one electoral vote or 0.1% of the popular vote), please see List of United States presidential candidates.

Note that there is no organizational continuity between the American parties of 1856 and 1972, the Union parties of 1860, 1864, 1888, 1900 and 1936, or the Progressive parties of 1912–16, 1924 and 1948–52.

Presidential winner in bold.

Vice-presidential nominees in small type preceded by "&".

People's ^{[Middle of the Road]} = "Middle of the Road" faction of the People's Party, who opposed fusing with the Democrats after 1896.

Elec- tion	Democratic convention	Democratic nominees	Republican convention	Republican nominees	Other conventions	Other nominees
1832	Baltimore, Maryland	**Andrew Jackson** & Martin Van Buren			Baltimore (National Republican, 1831)	Henry Clay & John Sergeant
1836	Baltimore (1835)	**Martin Van Buren** & Richard M. Johnson				
1840	Baltimore	Martin Van Buren [no vice-presidential nominee]			Harrisburg, Pennsylvania (Whig, 1839)	**William Henry Harrison** & John Tyler
1844	Baltimore	**James K. Polk** & George M. Dallas			Baltimore (Whig)	Henry Clay & Theodore Frelinghuysen
1848	Baltimore	Lewis Cass & William O. Butler			Philadelphia (Whig)	**Zachary Taylor** & Millard Fillmore
1852	Baltimore	**Franklin Pierce** & William R. King			Baltimore (Whig)	Winfield Scott & William R. Graham
1856	Cincinnati	**James Buchanan** & John C. Breckinridge	Philadelphia	John C. Frémont & William L. Dayton	Baltimore (Whig)	Millard Fillmore & Andrew Donelson
1860	Baltimore and Charleston, South Carolina	Stephen A. Douglas & Herschel V. Johnson (Official); John C. Breckinridge & Joseph Lane (Southern)	Chicago	**Abraham Lincoln** & Hannibal Hamlin	Baltimore (Constitutional Union)	John Bell & Edward Everett
1864	Chicago	George B. McClellan & George H. Pendleton	Baltimore (National Union)	**Abraham Lincoln** (Republican) & Andrew Johnson (War Democrat)	Cleveland (Radical Democratic)	John C. Frémont (Republican) — withdrew & John Cochrane (War Democrat)
1868	New York City	Horatio Seymour & Francis P. Blair, Jr	Chicago	**Ulysses S. Grant** & Schuyler Colfax		
1872	Baltimore	Horace Greeley & B. Gratz Brown (Liberal Republican)	Philadelphia	**Ulysses S. Grant** & Henry Wilson	Cincinnati, Ohio (Liberal Republican)	Horace Greeley & B. Gratz Brown
1872	Baltimore	Horace Greeley & B. Gratz Brown (Liberal Republican)	Philadelphia	**Ulysses S. Grant** & Henry Wilson	Louisville, Kentucky (Straight-Out Democratic)	Charles O'Conor — declined & John Quincy Adams II
1872	Baltimore	Horace Greeley & B. Gratz Brown (Liberal Republican)	Philadelphia	**Ulysses S. Grant** & Henry Wilson	New York (Equal Rights)	Victoria Woodhull & Frederick Douglass
1876	St. Louis	Samuel J. Tilden & Thomas A. Hendricks	Cincinnati	**Rutherford B. Hayes** & William A. Wheeler	Indianapolis (Greenback)	Peter Cooper & Samuel F. Cary
1880	Cincinnati	Winfield S. Hancock & William H. English	Chicago	**James A. Garfield** & Chester Alan Arthur	Chicago (Greenback)	James B. Weaver & Barzillai J. Chambers
1884	Chicago	**Grover Cleveland** & Thomas A. Hendricks	Chicago	James G. Blaine & John A. Logan	Indianapolis (Greenback)	Benjamin F. Butler & Absolom M. West
1888	St. Louis	Grover Cleveland & Allen G. Thurman	Chicago	**Benjamin Harrison** & Levi P. Morton	Cincinnati (Union Labor)	Alson Streeter & Charles E. Cunningham
1892	Chicago	**Grover Cleveland** & Adlai Stevenson I	Minneapolis	Benjamin Harrison & Whitelaw Reid	Omaha, Nebraska (People's)	James B. Weaver & James G. Field
1896	Chicago	William Jennings Bryan & Arthur Sewall	St. Louis	**William McKinley** & Garret Hobart	St. Louis (People's)	Wm J. Bryan (Dem.) & Thomas E. Watson (People's)
1896	Chicago	William Jennings Bryan & Arthur Sewall	St. Louis	**William McKinley** & Garret Hobart	St. Louis (National Silver Party)	Wm J. Bryan (Dem.) & Arthur Sewall (Dem.)
1896	Chicago	William Jennings Bryan & Arthur Sewall	St. Louis	**William McKinley** & Garret Hobart	Indianapolis (National ^{[Gold]} Democratic)	John M. Palmer & Simon Bolivar Buckner
1900	Kansas City	William Jennings Bryan & Adlai Stevenson I	Philadelphia	**William McKinley** & Theodore Roosevelt	Sioux Falls, South Dakota (People's)	William Jennings Bryan (Dem.) & Adlai Stevenson I (Dem.)
1900	Kansas City	William Jennings Bryan & Adlai Stevenson I	Philadelphia	**William McKinley** & Theodore Roosevelt	Cincinnati (People's ^{[Middle of the Road]} )	Wharton Barker & Ignatius Donnelly
1900	Kansas City	William Jennings Bryan & Adlai Stevenson I	Philadelphia	**William McKinley** & Theodore Roosevelt	Baltimore (Union Reform)	Seth Ellis & Samuel T. Nicholson
1904	St. Louis	Alton B. Parker & Henry G. Davis	Chicago	**Theodore Roosevelt** & Charles W. Fairbanks	Springfield Illinois (People's ^{[Middle of the Road]} )	Thomas E. Watson & Thomas Tibbles
1908	Denver	William Jennings Bryan & John W. Kern	Chicago	**William Howard Taft** & James S. Sherman	St. Louis (People's ^{[Middle of the Road]} )	Thomas E. Watson & Samuel Williams
1908	Denver	William Jennings Bryan & John W. Kern	Chicago	**William Howard Taft** & James S. Sherman	Chicago (Independence)	Thomas L. Hisgen & John T. Graves
1912	Baltimore	**Woodrow Wilson** & Thomas R. Marshall	Chicago	William Howard Taft & James S. Sherman	Chicago (Progressive)	Theodore Roosevelt & Hiram Johnson
1916	St. Louis	**Woodrow Wilson** & Thomas R. Marshall	Chicago	Charles Evans Hughes & Charles W. Fairbanks	Chicago (Progressive)	[Theodore Roosevelt] — intended nomination declined beforehand
1920	San Francisco	James M. Cox & Franklin Roosevelt	Chicago	**Warren G. Harding** & Calvin Coolidge	Chicago (Farmer-Labor)	Parley P. Christensen & Max Hayes
1924	New York City	John W. Davis & Charles W. Bryan	Cleveland	**Calvin Coolidge** & Charles Dawes	Cincinnati (Progressive)	Robert La Follette, Sr. & Burton K. Wheeler
1928	Houston (Texas)	Al Smith & Joseph T. Robinson	Kansas City, Missouri	**Herbert Hoover** & Charles Curtis	Chicago (Farmer-Labor)	Frank E. Webb & Will Vereen
1932	Chicago	**Franklin Roosevelt** & John Nance Garner	Chicago	Herbert Hoover & Charles Curtis	Omaha (Farmer-Labor)	Frank E. Webb & Jacob S. Coxey Sr.
1936	Philadelphia	**Franklin Roosevelt** & John Nance Garner	Cleveland	Alf Landon & Frank Knox	Cleveland (Union)	William Lemke & Thomas C. O'Brien
1940	Chicago	**Franklin Roosevelt** & Henry A. Wallace	Philadelphia	Wendell Willkie & Charles McNary		
1944	Chicago	**Franklin Roosevelt** & Harry Truman	Chicago	Thomas E. Dewey & John Bricker		
1948	Philadelphia	**Harry S. Truman** & Alben Barkley	Philadelphia	Thomas E. Dewey & Earl Warren	Philadelphia (Progressive)	Henry A. Wallace & Glen Taylor
1948	Philadelphia	**Harry S. Truman** & Alben Barkley	Philadelphia	Thomas E. Dewey & Earl Warren	Birmingham (States' Rights Democratic)	Strom Thurmond & Fielding Wright
1952	Chicago	Adlai Stevenson II & John Sparkman	Chicago	**Dwight D. Eisenhower** & Richard Nixon	Chicago (Progressive)	Vincent Hallinan & Charlotta Bass
1956	Chicago	Adlai Stevenson II & Estes Kefauver	San Francisco	**Dwight D. Eisenhower** & Richard Nixon	Richmond, Virginia (States' Rights)	T. Coleman Andrews & Thomas Werdel
1960	Los Angeles	**John F. Kennedy** & Lyndon Johnson	Chicago	Richard Nixon & Henry Cabot Lodge	Dayton, Ohio (National States' Rights)	Orval Faubus & John G. Crommelin
1964	Atlantic City (New Jersey)	**Lyndon B. Johnson** & Hubert Humphrey	San Francisco	Barry Goldwater & William E. Miller		
1968	Chicago	Hubert Humphrey & Edmund Muskie	Miami Beach (Florida)	**Richard Nixon** & Spiro Agnew	Ann Arbor, Mich. (Peace & Freedom)	Eldridge Cleaver & Peggy Terry
1972	Miami Beach	George McGovern & Thomas Eagleton	Miami Beach	**Richard Nixon** & Spiro Agnew	Louisville, Kentucky (American Party)	John G. Schmitz & Thomas J. Anderson
1972	Miami Beach	George McGovern & Thomas Eagleton	Miami Beach	**Richard Nixon** & Spiro Agnew	St Louis (People's Party)	Benjamin Spock & Julius Hobson
1976	New York City	**Jimmy Carter** & Walter Mondale	Kansas City, Missouri	Gerald Ford & Robert Dole	Chicago (American Independent Party)	Lester Maddox & William Dyke
1976	New York City	**Jimmy Carter** & Walter Mondale	Kansas City, Missouri	Gerald Ford & Robert Dole	Salt Lake City, Utah (American Party)	Thomas J. Anderson & Rufus Shackleford
1980	New York City	Jimmy Carter & Walter Mondale	Detroit	**Ronald Reagan** & George H. W. Bush	Cleveland (Citizens)	Barry Commoner & LaDonna Harris
1984	San Francisco	Walter Mondale & Geraldine Ferraro	Dallas	**Ronald Reagan** & George H.W. Bush	Saint Paul, Minnesota (Citizens)	Sonia Johnson & Richard J. Walton
1988	Atlanta	Michael Dukakis & Lloyd Bentsen	New Orleans	**George H. W. Bush** & Dan Quayle		
1992	New York City	**Bill Clinton** & Al Gore	Houston (Texas)	George H.W. Bush & Dan Quayle	Washington, D.C. (Natural Law Party)	John Hagelin & Mike Tompkins
1996	Chicago	**Bill Clinton** & Al Gore	San Diego	Robert Dole & Jack Kemp	Long Beach & Valley Forge (Reform)	Ross Perot & Pat Choate
2000	Los Angeles	Al Gore & Joe Lieberman	Philadelphia	**George W. Bush** & Dick Cheney	Long Beach, California (Reform)	Pat Buchanan & Ezola Foster
2004	Boston	John Kerry & John Edwards	New York City	**George W. Bush** & Dick Cheney	Irving, Texas (Reform)	Ralph Nader (ind.) & Peter Camejo (ind.)
2008	Denver (Colorado)	**Barack Obama** & Joe Biden	Saint Paul (Minnesota)	John McCain & Sarah Palin		
2012	Charlotte (North Carolina)	**Barack Obama** & Joe Biden	Tampa (Florida)	Mitt Romney & Paul Ryan		
2016	Philadelphia	Hillary Clinton & Tim Kaine	Cleveland (Ohio)	**Donald Trump** & Mike Pence		
2020	Milwaukee (Wisconsin)	**Joe Biden** & Kamala Harris	Charlotte (North Carolina)	Donald Trump & Mike Pence		
2024	Chicago	Kamala Harris & Tim Walz	Milwaukee	**Donald Trump** & JD Vance		

== Third-party conventions since 1872 ==
=== Prohibition and socialist parties ===
The Prohibition Party was organized in 1869. At the 1896 Prohibition Party convention in Pittsburgh, the majority of delegates supported a "narrow-gauge" platform confined to the prohibition of alcohol, while a "broad-gauge" minority — who also wanted to advocate for Free Silver and other reforms — broke away to form the National Party.

The Socialist Party of America (1901–1972) resulted from a merger of the Social Democratic Party (founded 1898) with dissenting members of the Socialist Labor Party (founded 1876). The Socialist Party of America stopped running its own candidates for president after 1956, but a minority of SPA members who disagreed with this policy broke away in 1973 to form the Socialist Party USA (SPUSA).

¶ Note that the years refer to the relevant presidential election and not necessarily to the date of a convention making a nomination for that election. Some nominating conventions meet in the year before an election.

Elec- tion	Prohibition Party convention	Prohibition Party nominee	Socialist Labor Party convention	Socialist Labor Party nominee	Social Democratic or Socialist Party convention	Social Democratic or Socialist Party nominee
1872	Columbus, Ohio	James Black				
1876	Cleveland	Green Clay Smith				
1880	Cleveland	Neal Dow				
1884	Pittsburgh	John St. John				
1888	Indianapolis	Clinton B. Fisk				
1892	Cincinnati	John Bidwell	New York City	Simon Wing		
1896	Pittsburgh (Prohibition Party)	Joshua Levering	New York City	Charles Matchett		
1896	Pittsburgh (National Party)	Charles Eugene Bentley	New York City	Charles Matchett		
1900	Chicago	John G. Woolley	New York City	Joseph F. Malloney	Indianapolis (SDP)	Eugene V. Debs
1904	Indianapolis	Silas C. Swallow	New York City	Charles H. Corregan	Chicago (SPA)	Eugene V. Debs
1908	Columbus	Eugene W. Chafin	New York City	August Gillhaus	Chicago (SPA)	Eugene V. Debs
1912	Atlantic City	Eugene W. Chafin	New York City	Arthur E. Reimer	Indianapolis (SPA)	Eugene V. Debs
1916	St. Paul	J. Frank Hanly	New York City	Arthur E. Reimer	(mail ballot)	(Allan L. Benson)
1920	Lincoln, Nebraska	Aaron Watkins	New York City	William Wesley Cox	New York City (SPA)	Eugene V. Debs
1924	Columbus	Herman P. Faris	New York City	Frank T. Johns	Cleveland (SPA)	Robert La Follette, Sr. (Progressive)
1928	Chicago	William F. Varney	New York City	Verne L. Reynolds	New York City (SPA)	Norman Thomas
1932	Indianapolis	William D. Upshaw	New York City	Verne L. Reynolds	Milwaukee (SPA)	Norman Thomas
1936	Niagara Falls, New York	D. Leigh Colvin	New York City	John W. Aiken	Cleveland (SPA)	Norman Thomas
1940	Chicago	Roger W. Babson	New York City	John W. Aiken	Washington, D.C. (SPA)	Norman Thomas
1944	Indianapolis	Claude A. Watson	New York City	Edward A. Teichert	Reading (SPA)	Norman Thomas
1948	Winona Lake, Indiana	Claude A. Watson	New York City	Edward A. Teichert	Reading (SPA)	Norman Thomas
1952	Indianapolis	Stuart Hamblen	New York City	Eric Hass	Cleveland (SPA)	Darlington Hoopes
1956	Milford, Indiana	Enoch A. Holtwick	New York City	Eric Hass	Chicago (SPA)	Darlington Hoopes
1960	Winona Lake, 1959	Rutherford Decker	New York City	Eric Hass		
1964	Chicago	E. Harold Munn	New York City	Eric Hass		
1968	Detroit	E. Harold Munn	Brooklyn	Henning A. Blomen		
1972	Wichita, Kansas	E. Harold Munn	Detroit	Louis Fisher		
1976	Wheat Ridge, Colorado	Benjamin C. Bubar	Southfield, Michigan	Jules Levin	Milwaukee (SPUSA)	Frank P. Zeidler
1980	Birmingham	Benjamin C. Bubar			Milwaukee (SPUSA)	David McReynolds
1984	Mandan, North Dakota	Earl Dodge			Milwaukee (SPUSA)	Sonia Johnson (Citizens')
1988	Springfield, Illinois	Earl Dodge			Milwaukee (SPUSA)	Willa Kenoyer
1992	Minneapolis	Earl Dodge			Chicago (SPUSA)	J. Quinn Brisben
1996	Denver	Earl Dodge			Cambridge (SPUSA 1995)	Mary Cal Hollis
2000	Bird-in-Hand, Pennsylvania	Earl Dodge			Milwaukee (SPUSA)	David McReynolds
2004	Fairfield Glade, Tennessee	Gene Amondson			Chicago (SPUSA)	Walt Brown
2008	Indianapolis	Gene Amondson			St. Louis (SPUSA)	Brian Moore
2012	Cullman, Alabama	Jack Fellure			Los Angeles (SPUSA)	Stewart Alexander
2016	(conference call)	(James Hedges)			Milwaukee (SPUSA)	Mimi Soltysik
2020	(conference call)	(Phil Collins)			Newark (SPUSA 2019)	Howie Hawkins (Green)
2024	Buffalo (2023)	Michael Wood			(Zoom call, SPUSA, 2023)	(Bill Stodden)

=== Workers', Communist and Socialist Workers parties ===
The Communist Party was formed by Leninists who had left the Socialist Party of America in 1919. The Socialist Workers Party was formed by Communists who followed Leon Trotsky rather than Joseph Stalin and briefly joined the Socialist Party before forming their own party in 1937.

¶ Specific details about how SWP presidential candidates were nominated in 1960 and after 1992 are sparse and unclear; clarifications are welcome. A list of the party's presidential and vice-presidential nominees from 1948 to the present can be found at Socialist Workers Party (United States)#Presidential elections.

Election	Communist Party convention	Communist nominee	SWP convention	Socialist Workers Party nominee
1924	Chicago [Workers Party]	William Z. Foster		
1928	New York City [Workers (Communist) Party]	William Z. Foster		
1932	Chicago	William Z. Foster		
1936	New York City	Earl Browder		
1940	New York City	Earl Browder		
1944	New York City (Communist Political Association)	no candidate nominated		
1948	New York City	Henry A. Wallace (Progressive)	New York City	Farrell Dobbs
1952		Vincent Hallinan (Progressive)	New York City	Farrell Dobbs
1956			New York City	Farrell Dobbs
1960				(Farrell Dobbs)
1964			New York City	Clifton DeBerry
1968	New York City	Charlene Mitchell	New York City	Fred Halstead
1972	New York City	Gus Hall	Detroit	Linda Jenness
1976	Chicago	Gus Hall	Oberlin, Ohio	Peter Camejo
1980	Detroit	Gus Hall	Oberlin, Ohio	Andrew Pulley
1984	Cleveland, Ohio	Gus Hall	New York City	Melvin T. Mason
1988			New York City	James Warren
1992			Chicago	James Warren

=== Libertarian, Green, and Constitution parties ===
In 1999, the United States Taxpayers' Party changed its name to the Constitution Party.

The individual article about a Libertarian convention or about a Green Party convention after 1996 is linked to its respective city in the table below. Cities linked for Constitution and U.S. Taxpayers' Party conventions lead to individual sections of Constitution Party National Convention.

Elec- tion	Libertarian Party convention	Libertarian Party nominee	Green Party convention	Green Party nominee	U.S. Taxpayers' or Constitution Party convention	U.S. Taxpayers' or Constitution Party nominee
1972	Denver	John Hospers				
1976	New York	Roger MacBride				
1980	Los Angeles	Ed Clark				
1984	New York (1983)	David Bergland				
1988	Seattle (1987)	Ron Paul				
1992	Chicago (1991)	André Marrou			New Orleans (US Taxpayers')	Howard Phillips
1996	Washington, D.C.	Harry Browne	Los Angeles	Ralph Nader	San Diego (US Taxpayers')	Howard Phillips
2000	Anaheim	Harry Browne	Denver	Ralph Nader	St. Louis (Constitution, 1999)	Howard Phillips
2004	Atlanta	Michael Badnarik	Milwaukee	David Cobb	Valley Forge, Pa. (Constitution)	Michael Peroutka
2008	Denver	Bob Barr	Chicago	Cynthia McKinney	Kansas City (Constitution)	Chuck Baldwin
2012	Las Vegas	Gary Johnson	Baltimore	Jill Stein	Nashville (Constitution)	Virgil Goode
2016	Orlando	Gary Johnson	Houston	Jill Stein	Salt Lake City (Constitution)	Darrell Castle
2020	(Online)	(Jo Jorgensen)	(Online)	(Howie Hawkins)	(Online) (Constitution)	(Don Blankenship)
2024	Washington, D.C.	Chase Oliver	(Online)	(Jill Stein)	Salt Lake City (Constitution)	Randall Terry

== Location of the party convention in relation to election winner ==
The list below shows the location of the party convention, along with the winner of the election. Bold font indicates that party won the presidential election. If the party won the state where the convention was held — but not necessarily that city itself — the box is shaded. (For example, while the 1948 Democratic, Progressive and Republican conventions were all held in Philadelphia, the city itself narrowly voted for Democratic President Harry Truman, while the state of Pennsylvania as a whole voted for the Republican candidate, Thomas Dewey. In this table the 1948 Republican box is shaded, but the Democratic one is not.). Other parties are only listed if they garnered Electoral College votes.

Election	Democratic Convention	Republican Convention	Other Party Convention
1832	**Baltimore, Maryland** (Jackson)		Baltimore, Maryland (National Republican, 1831)
1836	**Baltimore, Maryland (1835)** (Van Buren)		
1840	Baltimore, Maryland		**Harrisburg, Pennsylvania (Whig, 1839)** (WH Harrison)
1844	**Baltimore, Maryland** (Polk)		Baltimore, Maryland (Whig)
1848	Baltimore, Maryland		**Baltimore, Maryland (Whig)** (Taylor)
1852	**Baltimore, Maryland** (Pierce)		Baltimore, Maryland (Whig)
1856	**Cincinnati, Ohio** (Buchanan)	Philadelphia, Pennsylvania	**Baltimore, Maryland** (American)
1860	Charleston, South Carolina & Baltimore, Maryland	**Chicago, Illinois** (Lincoln)	Baltimore, Maryland (Constitutional Union)
1864	Chicago, Illinois	**Baltimore, Maryland (National Union)** (Lincoln)	
1868	New York City	**Chicago, Illinois** (Grant)	
1872	Baltimore, Maryland	**Philadelphia, Pennsylvania** (Grant)	Cincinnati. Ohio (Liberal Republican)
1876	St. Louis, Missouri	**Cincinnati, Ohio** (Hayes)	
1880	Cincinnati, Ohio	**Chicago, Illinois** (Garfield)	
1884	**Chicago, Illinois** (Cleveland)	Chicago, Illinois	
1888	St. Louis, Missouri	**Chicago, Illinois** (B. Harrison)	
1892	**Chicago, Illinois** (Cleveland)	Minneapolis, Minnesota	Omaha, Nebraska (People's)
1896	Chicago, Illinois	**St. Louis, Missouri** (McKinley)	St. Louis, Missouri (People's)
1900	Kansas City, Missouri	**Philadelphia, Pennsylvania** (McKinley)	
1904	St. Louis, Missouri	**Chicago, Illinois** (T. Roosevelt)	
1908	Denver, Colorado	**Chicago, Illinois** (Taft)	
1912	**Baltimore, Maryland** (Wilson)	Chicago, Illinois	Chicago, Illinois (Progressive)
1916	**St. Louis, Missouri** (Wilson)	Chicago, Illinois	
1920	San Francisco, California	**Chicago, Illinois** (Harding)	
1924	New York City	**Cleveland, Ohio** (Coolidge)	Cincinnati, Ohio (Progressive)
1928	Houston, Texas	**Kansas City, Missouri** (Hoover)	
1932	**Chicago, Illinois** (FDR)	Chicago, Illinois	
1936	**Philadelphia, Pennsylvania** (FDR)	Cleveland, Ohio	
1940	**Chicago, Illinois** (FDR)	Philadelphia, Pennsylvania	
1944	**Chicago, Illinois** (FDR)	Chicago, Illinois	
1948	**Philadelphia, Pennsylvania** (Truman)	Philadelphia, Pennsylvania	Birmingham, Alabama (States' Rights Democratic)
1952	Chicago, Illinois	**Chicago, Illinois** (Ike)	
1956	Chicago, Illinois	**San Francisco, California** (Ike)	
1960	**Los Angeles, California** (JFK)	Chicago, Illinois	
1964	**Atlantic City, New Jersey** (LBJ)	San Francisco, California	
1968	Chicago, Illinois	**Miami Beach, Florida** (Nixon)	
1972	Miami Beach, Florida	**Miami Beach, Florida** (Nixon)	
1976	**New York City** (Carter)	Kansas City, Missouri	
1980	New York City	**Detroit, Michigan** {Reagan)	
1984	San Francisco, California	**Dallas, Texas** {Reagan)	
1988	Atlanta, Georgia	**New Orleans, Louisiana** (GHW Bush)	
1992	**New York City** (Bill Clinton)	Houston, Texas	
1996	**Chicago, Illinois** (Bill Clinton)	San Diego, California	
2000	Los Angeles, California	**Philadelphia, Pennsylvania** (GW Bush)	
2004	Boston, Massachusetts	**New York City** (GW Bush)	
2008	**Denver, Colorado** (Obama)	Saint Paul, Minnesota	
2012	**Charlotte, North Carolina** (Obama)	Tampa, Florida	
2016	Philadelphia, Pennsylvania	**Cleveland, Ohio** (Trump)	
2020	**Milwaukee, Wisconsin** (Biden)	Charlotte, North Carolina	
2024	Chicago, Illinois	**Milwaukee, Wisconsin** (Trump)	

== See also ==
- List of Democratic National Conventions
  - List of United States Democratic Party presidential candidates
- List of Whig National Conventions
- List of Republican National Conventions
- Prohibition Party#Presidential campaigns
- Socialist Labor Party of America#National Conventions
- Socialist Labor Party of America#Presidential tickets
- Socialist Party of America#National Conventions
- National conventions of the Communist Party USA
- Socialist Workers Party — Presidential politics
- Libertarian National Convention
- Constitution Party National Convention
- Green National Convention
- Reform Party of the United States of America
- American Party (1969)#Presidential and vice-presidential candidates
- Electoral History of the American Independent and American Parties

== Sources (partial list) ==
- National Party Conventions eGuide, The Campaign Finance Institute,
- Chase, James S. Emergence of the Presidential Nominating Convention, 1789–1832 (Houghton Mifflin: 1973).
- Congressional Research Service. Presidential Elections in the United States: A Primer. (Washington, Congressional Research Service, April 17, 2000).
- History House: Conventional Wisdom
- Kane, Joseph Nathan, Presidential Fact Book (Random House, New York, 1998: ISBN 0-375-70244-X)
- Kull, Irving S. and Nell M., An Encyclopedia of American History in Chronological Order, enlarged and updated by Samuel H. Friedelbaum (Popular Library, New York, 1961)
- Morris, Richard B., Encyclopedia of American History, revised and enlarged edition (Harper & Row, New York and Evanston, Ill., 1961)
- Online NewsHour: Interview with Historian Michael Beschloss on the origins of the convention process
- Republican National Convention 2004: Convention History
- Taylor, Tim, The Book of Presidents (Arno Press, New York, 1972; ISBN 0-405-00226-2)
