= 1876 United States presidential election in New York =

- November 7, 1876
- Turnout: 89.6% ▲9.1 pp
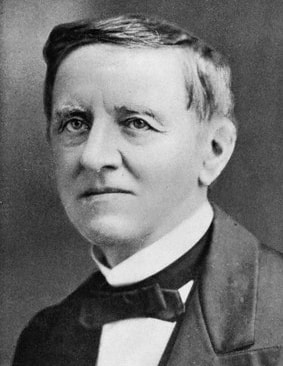

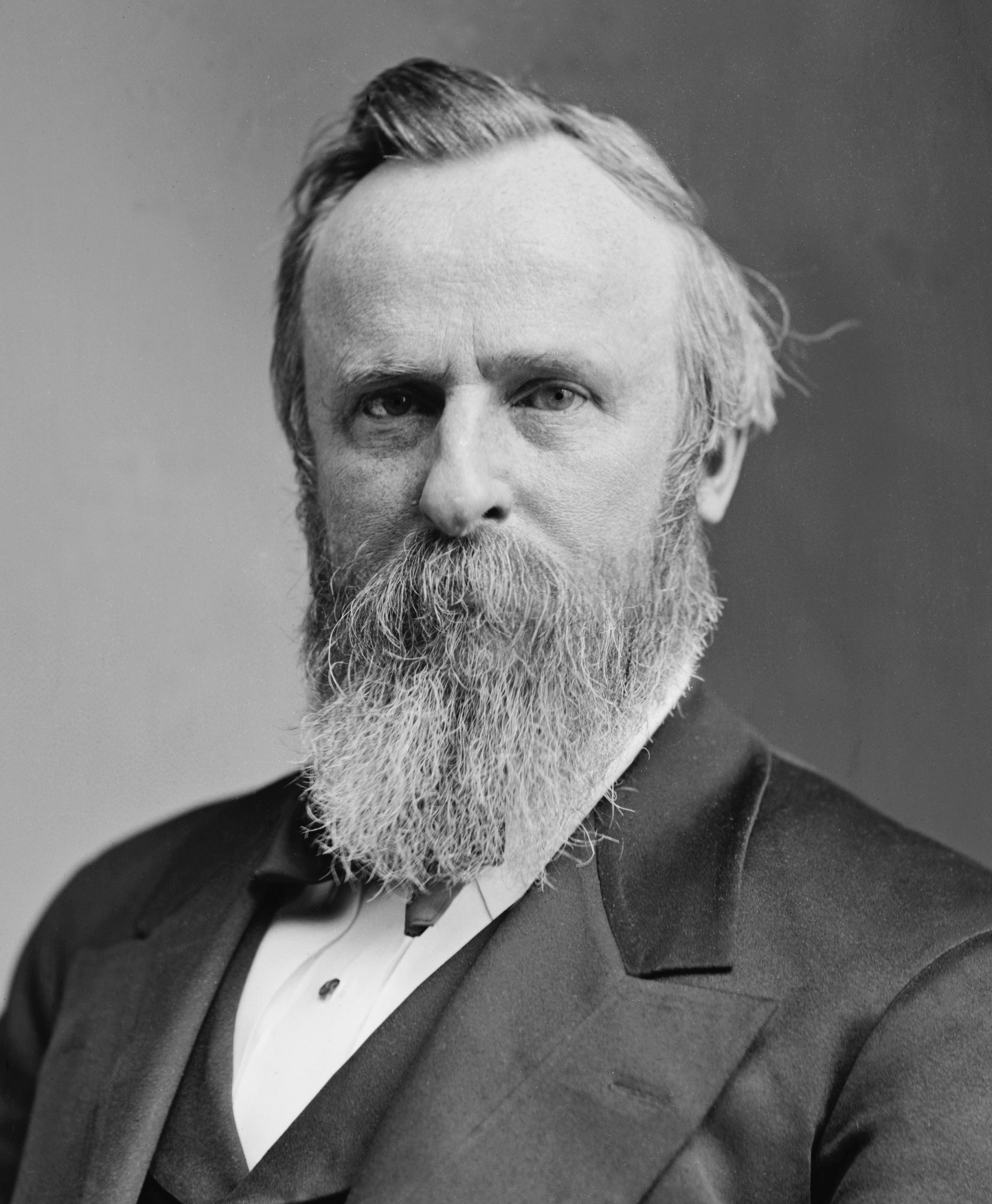
Nominee	Samuel J. Tilden	Rutherford B. Hayes
Party	Democratic	Republican
Home state	New York	Ohio
Running mate	Thomas A. Hendricks	William A. Wheeler
Electoral vote	35	0
Popular vote	522,043	489,505
Percentage	51.38%	48.18%
County results
Tilden
50–60%
60–70%
Hayes
50–60%
60–70%
President before election
Ulysses S. Grant
Republican
Elected President
Rutherford B. Hayes
Republican

The 1876 United States presidential election in New York took place on November 7, 1876. All contemporary 38 states were part of the 1876 United States presidential election. Voters chose 35 electors to the Electoral College, which selected the president and vice president.

New York was won by the Democratic nominees, Governor Samuel J. Tilden of New York and his running mate former Senator and Governor Thomas A. Hendricks of Indiana. Tilden and Hendricks defeated the Republican nominees, Governor Rutherford B. Hayes of Ohio and his running mate Congressman William A. Wheeler of New York.

Tilden carried New York State with 51.38% of the vote to Hayes's 48.18%, a victory margin of 3.20%. New York weighed in for this election as less than 1% more Democratic than the national average. While Tilden won his home state's 35 electoral votes, he ultimately narrowly lost his quest for the presidency in the electoral college by just one electoral vote, amidst heavily disputed election results, despite winning a majority of the nationwide popular vote by a 51–48 margin. Orange County would not vote Democratic again until 1964.

Tilden performed most strongly downstate in the New York City area, where he received more than 60% of the vote in New York County and Richmond County, and also won Kings County and Queens County. Tilden also won nearby Suffolk County, Westchester County, and Rockland County. Hayes won much of upstate New York, including a victory in Erie County, home to the city of Buffalo, although Tilden did win a fair number of upstate counties including Albany County, home to the state capital of Albany.

== Results ==
1876 United States presidential election in New York (Note: Since New York voted for presidential electors directly, the totals below are based on the highest elector on each ticket.)
Party	Candidate	Running mate	Popular vote		Electoral vote	
Party	Candidate	Running mate	Count	%	Count	%
Democratic	Samuel J. Tilden of New York	Thomas A. Hendricks of Indiana	522,043	51.38%	35	100.00%
Republican	Rutherford B. Hayes of Ohio	William A. Wheeler of New York	489,505	48.18%	0	0.00%
Prohibition	Green Smith of Washington, D.C.	Gideon T. Stewart of Ohio	2,359	0.23%	0	0.00%
Greenback	Peter Cooper of New York	Samuel F. Cary of Ohio	2,039	0.20%	0	0.00%
Anti-Masonic	James Walker of Illinois	Donald Kirkpatrick of New York	40	0.00%	0	0.00%
Total			1,015,946	100.00%	35	100.00%

=== Results by county ===
County	Samuel J. Tilden Democratic		Rutherford B. Hayes Republican		Green Smith Prohibition		Peter Cooper Greenback		James Walker Anti-Masonic		Margin		Total votes cast
County	#	%	#	%	#	%	#	%	#	%	#	%	Total votes cast
Albany	17,641	51.59%	16,463	48.15%	0	0.00%	88	0.26%	0	0.00%	1,178	3.45%	34,192
Allegany	3,741	34.94%	6,739	62.94%	7	0.07%	220	2.05%	2	0.02%	-2,998	-28.00%	10,707
Broome	5,424	44.39%	6,766	55.37%	24	0.20%	5	0.04%	0	0.00%	-1,342	-10.98%	12,219
Cattaraugus	5,054	42.37%	6,718	56.32%	45	0.38%	111	0.93%	0	0.00%	-1,664	-13.95%	11,928
Cayuga	6,119	40.20%	8,967	58.92%	97	0.64%	37	0.24%	2	0.01%	-2,848	-18.71%	15,220
Chautauqua	5,685	35.80%	10,065	63.38%	10	0.06%	120	0.76%	11	0.07%	-4,380	-27.58%	15,880
Chemung	5,228	52.32%	4,730	47.34%	8	0.08%	26	0.26%	0	0.00%	498	4.98%	9,992
Chenango	4,826	43.26%	6,173	55.33%	127	1.14%	31	0.28%	1	0.01%	-1,347	-12.07%	11,157
Clinton	4,796	46.57%	5,502	53.42%	0	0.00%	1	0.01%	0	0.00%	-706	-6.86%	10,299
Columbia	6,311	52.02%	5,799	47.80%	1	0.01%	21	0.17%	0	0.00%	512	4.22%	12,132
Cortland	2,642	39.37%	4,038	60.18%	21	0.31%	9	0.13%	0	0.00%	-1,396	-20.80%	6,710
Delaware	5,272	47.18%	5,867	52.51%	25	0.22%	10	0.09%	0	0.00%	-595	-5.32%	11,174
Dutchess	9,102	48.36%	9,501	50.48%	203	1.08%	14	0.07%	0	0.00%	-399	-2.12%	18,820
Erie	19,533	48.93%	20,300	50.85%	27	0.07%	63	0.16%	0	0.00%	-767	-1.92%	39,923
Essex	2,955	39.72%	4,477	60.17%	7	0.09%	1	0.01%	0	0.00%	-1,522	-20.46%	7,440
Franklin	2,946	41.75%	4,104	58.16%	4	0.06%	3	0.04%	1	0.01%	-1,158	-16.41%	7,057
Fulton	3,662	48.01%	3,940	51.66%	24	0.31%	1	0.01%	0	0.00%	-278	-3.64%	7,627
Genesee	3,321	43.17%	4,321	56.18%	2	0.03%	48	0.62%	1	0.01%	-1,000	-13.00%	7,692
Greene	4,771	56.11%	3,678	43.26%	41	0.48%	13	0.15%	0	0.00%	1,093	12.85%	8,503
Hamilton (Note: Voted with Fulton County)	569	63.86%	322	36.14%	0	0.00%	0	0.00%	0	0.00%	247	27.72%	891
Herkimer	5,212	45.80%	5,966	52.42%	160	1.41%	43	0.38%	0	0.00%	-754	-6.63%	11,381
Jefferson	7,094	43.36%	9,227	56.40%	31	0.19%	8	0.05%	4	0.02%	-2,133	-13.04%	16,360
Kings	57,557	59.49%	39,125	40.44%	12	0.01%	50	0.05%	0	0.00%	18,432	19.05%	96,744
Lewis	3,707	50.61%	3,610	49.29%	5	0.07%	2	0.03%	0	0.00%	97	1.32%	7,324
Livingston	4,244	44.49%	5,267	55.21%	8	0.08%	21	0.22%	0	0.00%	-1,023	-10.72%	9,540
Madison	4,762	41.38%	6,683	58.07%	32	0.28%	32	0.28%	1	0.01%	-1,921	-16.69%	11,509
Monroe	13,127	46.95%	14,739	52.71%	46	0.16%	48	0.17%	0	0.00%	-1,612	-5.77%	27,960
Montgomery	4,765	51.52%	4,457	48.19%	23	0.25%	3	0.03%	0	0.00%	308	3.33%	9,248
New York	112,621	65.60%	58,776	34.23%	0	0.00%	289	0.17%	0	0.00%	53,845	31.36%	171,686
Niagara	5,890	50.98%	5,575	48.26%	84	0.73%	4	0.03%	3	0.03%	315	2.73%	11,553
Oneida	12,844	47.55%	14,020	51.90%	100	0.37%	47	0.17%	1	0.00%	-1,176	-4.35%	27,011
Onondaga	11,162	42.67%	14,867	56.83%	80	0.31%	50	0.19%	1	0.00%	-3,705	-14.16%	26,159
Ontario	5,528	46.38%	6,334	53.15%	49	0.41%	7	0.06%	0	0.00%	-806	-6.76%	11,918
Orange	9,776	50.75%	9,430	48.96%	32	0.17%	24	0.12%	0	0.00%	346	1.80%	19,262
Orleans	3,117	42.14%	4,253	57.50%	21	0.28%	6	0.08%	0	0.00%	-1,136	-15.36%	7,397
Oswego	7,417	41.38%	10,229	57.08%	164	0.92%	112	0.62%	0	0.00%	-2,812	-15.69%	17,922
Otsego	7,026	50.24%	6,859	49.04%	94	0.67%	7	0.05%	1	0.01%	167	1.19%	13,986
Putnam	1,805	48.08%	1,949	51.92%	0	0.00%	0	0.00%	0	0.00%	-144	-3.84%	3,754
Queens	9,994	58.77%	6,971	40.99%	20	0.12%	21	0.12%	2	0.01%	3,023	17.78%	17,006
Rensselaer	12,926	51.20%	12,254	48.54%	25	0.10%	41	0.16%	0	0.00%	672	2.66%	25,246
Richmond	4,338	60.06%	2,884	39.93%	0	0.00%	1	0.01%	0	0.00%	1,454	20.13%	7,223
Rockland	3,494	59.59%	2,349	40.06%	19	0.32%	1	0.02%	0	0.00%	1,145	19.53%	5,863
Saratoga	6,496	46.31%	7,489	53.39%	35	0.25%	6	0.04%	0	0.00%	-993	-7.08%	14,026
Schenectady	2,947	52.15%	2,690	47.60%	12	0.21%	2	0.04%	0	0.00%	257	4.55%	5,651
Schoharie	5,324	59.89%	3,549	39.93%	12	0.13%	4	0.04%	0	0.00%	1,775	19.97%	8,889
Schuyler	2,254	42.84%	2,860	54.35%	132	2.51%	16	0.30%	1	0.02%	-606	-11.52%	5,262
Seneca	3,613	53.74%	3,076	45.75%	7	0.10%	27	0.40%	0	0.00%	537	7.99%	6,723
St. Lawrence	5,784	29.99%	13,465	69.82%	30	0.16%	6	0.03%	5	0.03%	-7,681	-39.83%	19,285
Steuben	8,803	47.21%	9,762	52.35%	32	0.17%	49	0.26%	0	0.00%	-959	-5.14%	18,646
Suffolk	5,804	50.34%	5,589	48.48%	125	1.08%	11	0.10%	0	0.00%	215	1.86%	11,529
Sullivan	4,402	57.39%	3,262	42.53%	2	0.03%	4	0.05%	0	0.00%	1,140	14.86%	7,670
Tioga	3,906	45.20%	4,675	54.10%	41	0.47%	19	0.22%	0	0.00%	-769	-8.90%	8,641
Tompkins	4,028	43.83%	5,032	54.75%	114	1.24%	17	0.18%	1	0.01%	-1,004	10.92%	9,191
Ulster	10,636	54.20%	8,914	45.42%	44	0.22%	31	0.16%	0	0.00%	1,722	8.77%	19,625
Warren	2,663	45.48%	3,135	53.54%	9	0.15%	48	0.82%	0	0.00%	-472	-8.06%	5,855
Washington	4,815	39.41%	7,303	59.77%	7	0.06%	93	0.76%	0	0.00%	-2,488	-20.36%	12,218
Wayne	5,199	42.06%	7,081	57.29%	44	0.36%	36	0.29%	1	0.01%	-1,882	-15.23%	12,360
Westchester	12,054	55.67%	9,574	44.21%	12	0.06%	14	0.06%	0	0.00%	2,480	11.45%	21,654
Wyoming	3,266	42.35%	4,428	57.42%	3	0.04%	15	0.19%	1	0.01%	-1,162	-15.07%	7,712
Yates	2,045	37.91%	3,327	61.68%	20	0.37%	2	0.04%	0	0.00%	-1,282	-23.77%	5,394
Totals	522,043	51.38%	489,505	48.18%	2,359	0.23%	2,039	0.20%	40	0.00%	32,538	3.20%	1,015,946

==== Counties that flipped from Republican to Democratic ====
- Albany
- Chemung
- Lewis
- Montgomery
- Niagara
- Orange
- Queens
- Rensselaer
- Richmond
- Schenectady
- Seneca
- Suffolk
- Sullivan
- Ulster

==== Counties that flipped from Liberal Republican to Republican ====
- Dutchess

== See also ==
- United States presidential elections in New York
- Presidency of Rutherford B. Hayes
