= List of Whig National Conventions =

This article lists the presidential nominating conventions of the United States Whig Party between 1839 and 1856. Note: Conventions whose nominees won the subsequent presidential election are in bold

Year	Location	Presidential Nominee	Vice Presidential Nominee
1839	Harrisburg, Pennsylvania	**William Henry Harrison** of Ohio	**John Tyler** of Virginia
1844	Baltimore	Henry Clay of Kentucky	Theodore Frelinghuysen of New Jersey
1848	Philadelphia	**Zachary Taylor** of Louisiana	**Millard Fillmore** of New York
1852	Baltimore	Winfield Scott of New Jersey	William A. Graham of North Carolina
1856	Baltimore	Millard Fillmore of New York^{a}	Andrew J. Donelson of Tennessee^{a}

^{a}Fillmore and Donelson had previously been nominated as candidates of the American Party.

== See also ==
- List of presidential nominating conventions in the United States
- List of Republican National Conventions
- List of Democratic National Conventions
- List of United States National Republican/Whig Party presidential tickets
- 1831 National Republican National Convention
