= 1884 Prohibition National Convention =

American political convention

- 1884 presidential election
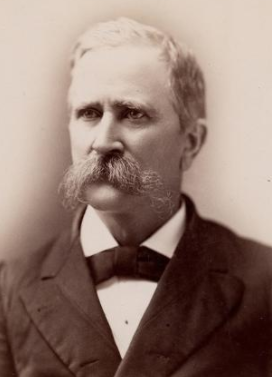
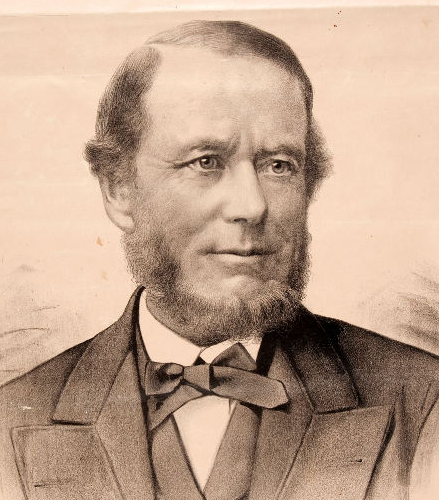
- Nominees; St. John and Daniel

Convention
- Dates: July 23–24, 1884
- City: Pittsburgh, Pennsylvania
- Venue: Lafayette Hall

Candidates
- Presidential nominee: John St. John of Kansas
- Vice-presidential nominee: William Daniel of Maryland

Voting
- Total delegates: ~500

The 1884 Prohibition National Convention was a presidential nominating convention held at Lafayette Hall, in Pittsburgh, Pennsylvania, from July 23–24, 1884, to select the Prohibition Party's presidential ticket for the 1884 presidential election.

== Logistics ==
The convention was held in Pittsburgh, Pennsylvania, and featured nearly 500 accredited delegates. It was attended by between 2,000 and 3,000 additional supporters of the party.

== Opening ==
On July 23, 1884, the convention was called to open by Chairman Gideon T. Stewart and was attended by 505 delegates from thirty one states. Reverend Alonzo Ames Miner, who had served as the president of the 1880 convention, gave the opening prayer, Secretary R. W. Nelson read the call for the convention, Stewart gave the opening address where he criticized the alcohol industry as a greater evil than slavery, Reverend C. W. Blanchard gave a speech, and Frances Willard read a message from the Woman's Christian Temperance Union giving support to a constitutional amendment prohibiting the sale and consumption of alcohol.

Samuel Dickie was selected to serve as the chairman of the convention and afterwards the vice-presidents of the thirty one state delegations were selected with ten being female.

== Presidential nomination ==
On July 24, the delegates reconvened to vote on the presidential nomination. The California delegation nominated R. H. McDonald, who was seconded by delegates from Kentucky and Maine, the Illinois delegation nominated former Kansas Governor John St. John, who was seconded by Frances Willard, the Massachusetts delegation nominated Gideon T. Stewart, and a delegate from Pennsylvania nominated former presidential nominee James Black. Stewart withdrew from the balloting and endorsed St. John, the California delegation withdrew McDonald's nomination, and Black declined to contest the presidential ballot.

John B. Finch made a motion to suspend the rules to nominate St. John by acclamation was successful and 505 delegates voted in favor of St. John, who accepted the nomination via telegram. William Daniel of Maryland was selected to serve as the vice-presidential nominee.

== Platform ==
The platform drafted by the platform committee was approved by the delegates, and it criticized the Republican and Democratic parties for not creating prohibition legislation while in power, included support for the prohibition of the sale and consumption of alcohol, increasing immigration, political and civil gender equality, women's suffrage, refusing to allow statehood to areas without the prohibition of polygamous marriages, soldier pensions, and money issued and regulated by the federal government.

The platform plank in support of women's suffrage was weakened by Frances Willard to gain support among southern votes.

== Election outcome ==
The Prohibition ticket may have had a spoiler effect on the outcome of the presidential election. The Prohibition Party received a sizable number of votes in 1884, which the Democratic ticket won by a far narrower margin. New York's electors were decisive to Democrats winning the Electoral College vote. A portion of voters who usually voted Republican were particularly distrusting of the Republican presidential nominee James G. Blaine, making it probable that the Prohibition ticket (headed by a former Republican governor) attracted enough votes from disaffected Republicans in New York to swing the election.

== See also ==
- 1884 Republican National Convention
- 1884 Democratic National Convention
