= 1880 Prohibition National Convention =

American political convention

- 1880 presidential election
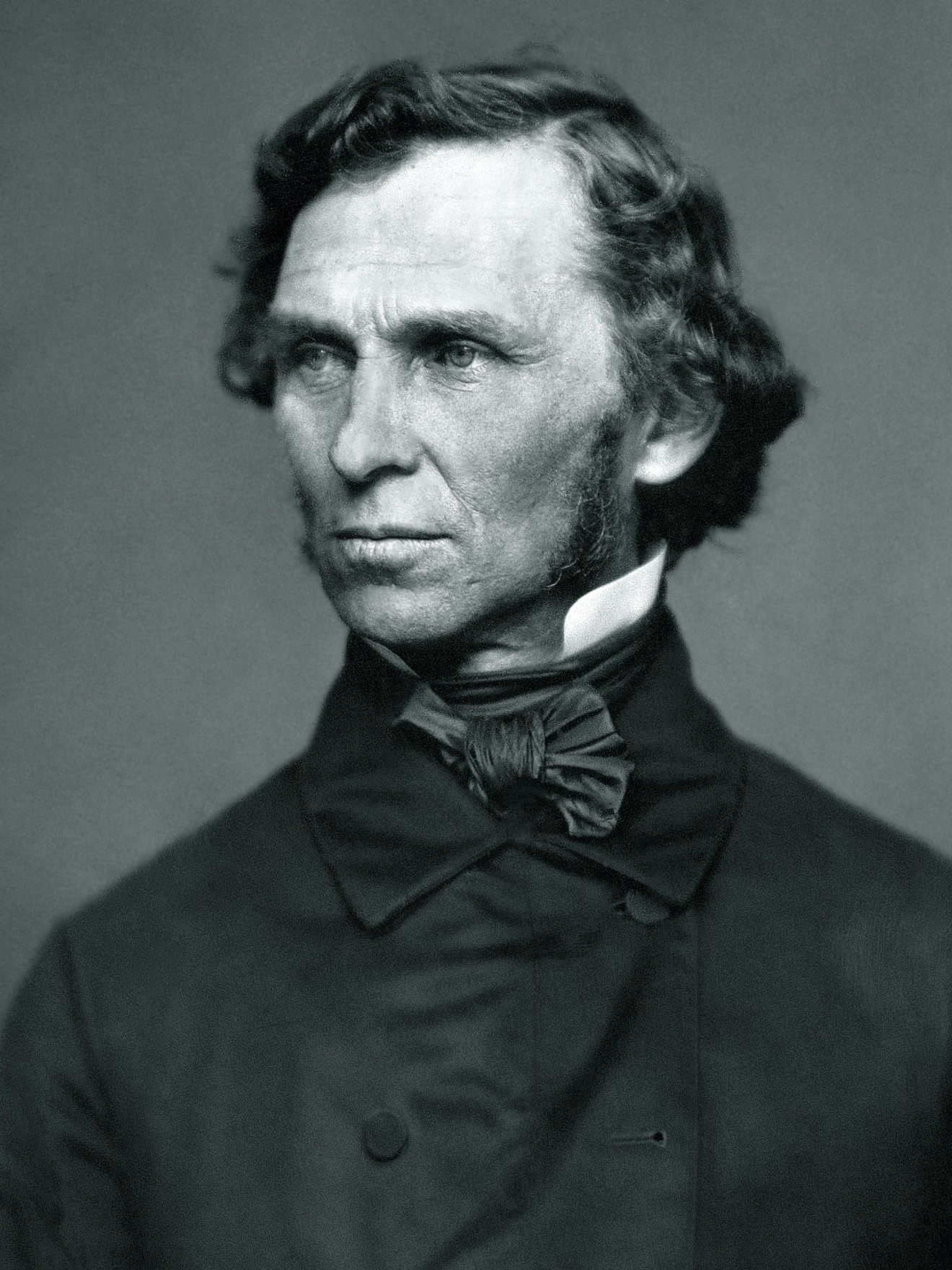
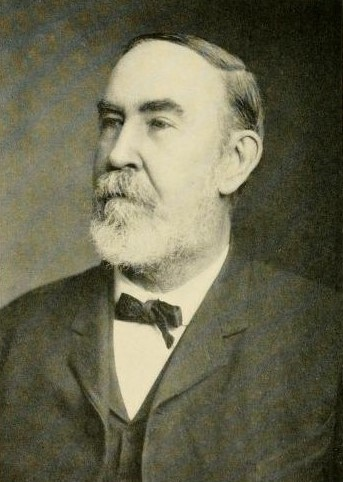
- Nominees; Dow and Thompson

Convention
- Dates: June 17, 1880
- City: Cleveland, Ohio
- Venue: Halle's Hall

Candidates
- Presidential nominee: Neal Dow of Maine
- Vice-presidential nominee: Henry Adams Thompson of Ohio

Voting
- Total delegates: 142
- Results (president): 142
- Results (vice president): 142

The 1880 Prohibition Party National Convention convened in Halle's Hall in Cleveland, Ohio on June 17, 1880 to select presidential and vice presidential nominees for the 1880 United States presidential election. Delegates unanimously chose Neal Dow of Maine for President and Henry Adams Thompson of Ohio for Vice President. They were both nominated by a founder of the party, James Black. Dow and Thompson left the convention as the party's nominees, but in the end, they lost. The election was a close contest between the Republican, James A. Garfield, and the Democrat, Winfield Scott Hancock, with Garfield being the victor. The Prohibition Party placed a distant fourth, netting just over 0.1% of the popular vote.

== Presidential nomination ==
On June 17, 1880, the national convention was called to open and was attended by 142 delegates. Reverend Alonzo Ames Miner was selected to serve as the president of the convention. Neal Dow, the former mayor of Portland, Maine and a former Civil War general, and Henry Adams Thompson were nominated for the presidential and vice presidential nominations by James Black, hoping that other national figures would seek the party's nomination, and they were approved by acclamation.

| Presidential Ballot | Unanimous | Vice Presidential Ballot | Unanimous |
| Neal Dow | 142 | Henry Adams Thompson | 142 |

== Platform ==
Although the platforms of the party in 1872 and 1876 included support and opposition to multiple issues, the platform drafted and accepted at the 1880 national convention only included support for issues relating to the prohibition of alcohol and women's suffrage due to the fact that the narrow gauger faction, which supported a single issue prohibitionist platform, was the group writing it.

== Candidates ==
=== Neal Dow ===
In 1880, Maine Republicans refused to pass more anti-alcohol legislation, and Dow quit the party to join the Prohibitionists, he quickly became the party's most prominent member. His friend and ally James Black requested that Dow's name be placed in nomination for the presidency at the 1880 convention, to which Dow agreed. He unanimously nominated and the Prohibition ticket polled just 10,305 votes, 0.1% of the total.

=== Henry Adams Thompson ===
Thompson had identified with the Republican Party since its founding in the 1850s, but in 1874 he left it to join the Prohibition Party.

== Aftermath ==
The Prohibition Party received 10,305 votes and no electoral votes, compared to 4,446,158 for the winner, Republican James A. Garfield, and 4,444,260 for Democrat Winfield Scott Hancock.

Electoral results
| Presidential candidate | Party | Home state | Popular vote | | Electoral vote | Running mate | | |
| Presidential candidate | Party | Home state | Count | Percentage | Electoral vote | Vice-presidential candidate | Home state | Electoral vote |
|---|---|---|---|---|---|---|---|---|
| James A. Garfield | Republican | Ohio | 4,454,443 | 48.32% | 214 | Chester A. Arthur | New York | 214 |
| Winfield Scott Hancock | Democratic | Pennsylvania | 4,444,976 | 48.21% | 155 | William Hayden English | Indiana | 155 |
| James B. Weaver | Greenback | Iowa | 308,649 | 3.35% | 0 | Barzillai J. Chambers | Texas | 0 |
| Neal Dow | Prohibition | Maine | 10,364 | 0.11% | 0 | Henry Adams Thompson | Ohio | 0 |
| John W. Phelps | Anti-Masonic | Vermont | 1,045 | 0.01% | 0 | Samuel C. Pomeroy | Kansas | 0 |
| Total | | | 9,219,477 | 100% | 369 | | | 369 |
| Needed to win | | | | | 185 | | | 185 |

== See also ==
- 1880 Republican National Convention
- 1880 Democratic National Convention
- 1880 Greenback National Convention
