= 1872 Prohibition National Convention =

American political convention

- 1872 presidential election
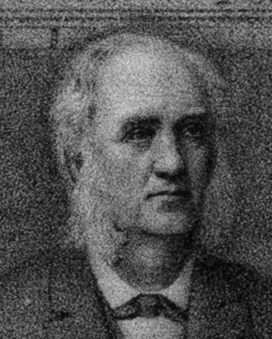
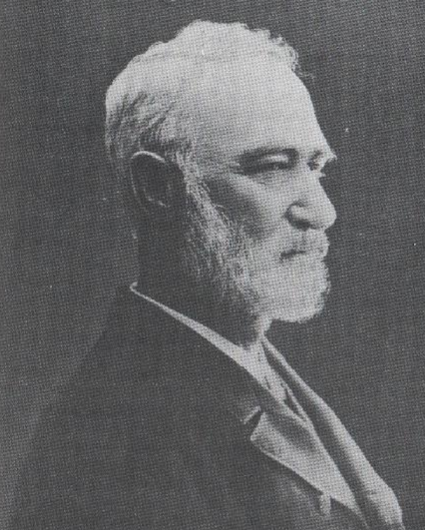
- Nominees; Black and Russell

Convention
- Date(s): February 22, 1872
- City: Columbus, Ohio
- Venue: Comstock's Opera House

Candidates
- Presidential nominee: James Black of Pennsylvania
- Vice-presidential nominee: John Russell of Michigan

Voting
- Total delegates: 194
- Results (president): acclamation
- Results (vice president): acclamation
- Ballots: 1

The 1872 Prohibition National Convention was a presidential nominating convention held at Comstock's Opera House, in Columbus, Ohio on February 22, 1872, to select the presidential ticket for the 1872 presidential election. It was the first presidential nominating convention of the newly organized Prohibition Party and would continue nominating presidential candidates in every presidential election leading it to become the longest continuous third party in the United States.

== Party formation ==
At meetings in 1868 and 1869, the International Organisation of Good Templars resolved to establish an affiliated political party. On September 1, 1869, almost five hundred delegates from twenty states and Washington, D.C., met at Farwell Hall in Chicago, and John Russell was selected to serve as the new party's temporary chairman and James Black as president of the convention. The party was the first to accept women as members and gave those who attended full delegate rights. Former anti-slavery activist Gerrit Smith, who had served in the House of Representatives from 1853 to 1854 and had run for president in 1848, 1856, and 1860 with the Liberty Party nomination, served as a delegate from New York and gave a speech at the convention. At that time, the party was referred to as either the "National Prohibition Party" or the "Prohibition Reform Party".

== Logistics ==
On December 9, 1871, a national convention was called to occur on February 22, 1872, by the National Prohibition Committee and was attended by 194 delegates. The convention overlapped with the 1872 Labor Reform National Convention also held in the city.

Simeon B. Chase was selected as the chairman of the party after being introduced by incumbent Chairman John Russell.

== Presidential nomination ==
The delegates at the convention proposed Chairman Simeon B. Chase, Chief Justice Salmon P. Chase, former Liberty Party presidential nominee Gerrit Smith, former Portland Mayor Neal Dow, Major general Benjamin Butler, Justice David Davis, James Black, Horace Greeley, and John Russell as presidential nominees and Henry Fish, James Black, John Blackman, Secretary Gideon T. Stewart, Julius A. Spencer, John Russell, and Stephen B. Ransom for the vice presidential nomination.

The candidates were sent to a special committee and it chose James Black for the presidential nomination and former Chairman John Russell for the vice presidential nomination. The committee rejected Greeley, who had won the nominations of both the Liberal Republican and Democratic parties, for not being supportive of women's suffrage and Butler for his stances on alcoholic prohibition; Black and Russell were sent back to the delegates and approved by acclamation.

Presidential Ballot	Unanimous	Vice Presidential Ballot	Unanimous
James Black	194	John Russell	194
