= List of United States presidential candidates =

Presidential candidates win the election by winning a majority of the electoral vote. If no candidate wins a majority of the electoral vote, the winner is determined through a contingent election held in the United States House of Representatives; this situation has occurred twice in U.S. history. The procedures governing presidential elections were changed significantly with the ratification of the Twelfth Amendment in 1804. Since 1824, a national popular vote has been tallied for each election, but the national popular vote does not directly affect the winner of the presidential election.

The United States has had a two-party system for much of its history, and the major parties of the two-party system have dominated presidential elections for most of U.S. history. The two current major parties are the Democratic Party and the Republican Party. At various points prior to the American Civil War, the Federalist Party, the Democratic-Republican Party, the National Republican Party, and the Whig Party were major parties. These six parties have nominated candidates in the vast majority of presidential elections, though some presidential elections have deviated from the normal pattern of two major party candidates. In most elections, third party and independent candidates have also sought the presidency, but no such candidates have won the presidency since the ratification of the Twelfth Amendment, and only two such candidates have finished second in either the popular vote or the electoral vote.

== Pre-12th Amendment: 1789–1800 ==
Prior to the ratification of the Twelfth Amendment in 1804, each member of the Electoral College cast two votes, with no distinction made between electoral votes for president and electoral votes for vice president. Under these rules, the individual who received the most electoral votes would become president, and the individual who received the second most electoral votes would become vice president. (Note: The pre-12th Amendment constitutional rules required a contingent election when multiple candidates tied for the highest number of electoral votes, or when no individual won an electoral vote from a majority of the electors. The former situation occurred in the 1800 presidential election, when the House of Representatives elected Thomas Jefferson over his nominal running mate, Aaron Burr.)

The following candidates received at least one electoral vote in elections held before the ratification of the Twelfth Amendment in 1804. Winning candidates are bolded. Political parties began to nominate presidential candidates in the 1796 presidential election, and candidates are therefore not listed as representatives of any party prior.

Year	Winning candidate	Runner-up	Others receiving electoral votes
1788–89	**George Washington**	John Adams	John Jay; Robert H. Harrison; John Rutledge; John Hancock; George Clinton; Samuel Huntington; John Milton; James Armstrong; Benjamin Lincoln; Edward Telfair
1792	**George Washington**	John Adams	George Clinton; Thomas Jefferson; Aaron Burr
1796	**John Adams** (Federalist)	Thomas Jefferson (Democratic Republican)	Thomas Pinckney (Federalist) Aaron Burr (Democratic-Republican); Samuel Adams (Democratic Republican); Oliver Ellsworth (Federalist); George Clinton (Democratic Republican); John Jay (Federalist); James Iredell (Federalist); Samuel Johnston (Federalist); George Washington (Independent); John Henry (Federalist); Charles Cotesworth Pinckney (Federalist)
1800	**Thomas Jefferson** (Democratic Republican)	Aaron Burr (Democratic Republican)	John Adams (Federalist); Charles Cotesworth Pinckney (Federalist); John Jay (Federalist)

== Post-12th Amendment: 1804–present ==
Since the ratification of the Twelfth Amendment in 1804, each member of the Electoral College has cast one vote for president and one vote for vice president, and presidential candidates have generally competed on a ticket with a running mate who seeks to win the vice presidency. (Note: A presidential candidate must win a majority of the electoral vote to win the election. If no candidate wins a majority of the vote, a contingent election is held in the House of Representatives. Just one election, the 1824 election, has been decided by a contingent election since the ratification of the Twelfth Amendment.) Since 1824, the national popular vote has been recorded, though the national popular vote has no direct effect on the winner of the election. (Note: Five candidates have lost a presidential election despite winning a plurality or majority of the popular vote in that election.)

The following candidates won at least 0.1% of the national popular vote in elections held since 1824, or won at least one electoral vote from an elector.

- † and **bolded** indicates a winning candidate
- ‡ indicates a losing candidate who won a plurality or majority of the popular vote
- ↑ indicates a third party or independent candidate who finished second in the popular vote or the electoral vote (or both)
- § indicates a pending election that hasn't been fully confirmed
- * indicates a candidate who only won electoral votes from faithless electors

Year	Democratic-Republican	Federalist candidate	Others receiving electoral votes	Other candidate(s)
1804	**Thomas Jefferson**†	Charles Cotesworth Pinckney		
1808	**James Madison**†	Charles Cotesworth Pinckney	George Clinton* (Democratic-Republican)	
1812	**James Madison**†	DeWitt Clinton (Note: Clinton was a Northern Democratic-Republican who challenged the incumbent Democratic-Republican president, James Madison, in the general election. Clinton was nominated for president by a legislative caucus of New York Democratic-Republicans, and much of his support came from Democratic-Republicans dissatisfied with Madison's leadership in the War of 1812. The Federalist Party did not officially nominate Clinton, but most Federalist leaders tacitly supported Clinton's candidacy in hopes of defeating Madison.)		
1816	**James Monroe**†	Rufus King (Note: The Federalists did not nominate a ticket in 1816, though some Federalists were elected to serve as presidential electors. A majority of the Federalist electors cast their presidential vote for King and their vice presidential vote for John Eager Howard.)		
1820	**James Monroe**†	No opponent (Note: The Federalist Party did not nominate a presidential candidate and essentially conceded the 1820 presidential election before it was held. Monroe did not face any opposition in the election, although one presidential elector, William Plumer, cast his vote for John Quincy Adams.)	John Quincy Adams* (Democratic-Republican)	
Year	Democratic-Republican candidate	Democratic-Republican candidate	Others receiving electoral votes	Other candidate(s)
1824	Andrew Jackson‡ (Note: The Democratic-Republican Party was unable to unite behind a single candidate in 1824. Four Democratic-Republicans received electoral votes in the general election, and, as no candidate won a majority of the electoral vote, the election was decided in a contingent election held in the House of Representatives. John Quincy Adams won that contingent election.)	**John Quincy Adams**†	William H. Crawford (Democratic-Republican) Henry Clay (Democratic-Republican)	
Year	Democratic candidate	National Republican candidate	Others receiving electoral votes	Other candidate(s)
1828	**Andrew Jackson**†	John Quincy Adams		
1832	**Andrew Jackson**†	Henry Clay	John Floyd (Nullifier) William Wirt (Anti-Masonic)	
Year	Democratic candidate	Whig candidate	Others receiving electoral votes	Other candidate(s)
1836	**Martin Van Buren**†	William Henry Harrison (Note: The Whigs did not unite around a single candidate in 1836, but the party ran only one presidential candidate per state. 25 states held a popular vote in the 1836 election; Harrison was the Whig candidate in fifteen states, most of which were in the North, White was the Whig candidate in nine states, all of which were in the South, and Daniel Webster was the Whig candidate in Massachusetts. Harrison and White each received electoral votes from multiple states, while Webster and Willie Person Mangum each received electoral votes from a single state (Massachusetts and South Carolina, respectively).)	Hugh Lawson White (Whig) Daniel Webster (Whig) Willie Person Mangum (Whig)	
1840	Martin Van Buren	**William Henry Harrison**†		James G. Birney (Liberty)
1844	**James K. Polk**†	Henry Clay		James G. Birney (Liberty)
1848	Lewis Cass	**Zachary Taylor**†		Martin Van Buren (Free Soil)
1852	**Franklin Pierce**†	Winfield Scott		John P. Hale (Free Soil); Daniel Webster (Whig) (Note: After his defeat at the 1852 Whig National Convention, Webster allowed various third party groups to nominate him for president, although he did not openly condone these efforts. Though Webster died shortly before the 1852 election was held, thousands of Whigs opposed to Winfield Scott, as well as members of the nativist Native American Party, cast their vote for Webster.)
Year	Democratic candidate	Republican candidate	Others receiving electoral votes	Other candidate(s)
1856	**James Buchanan**†	John C. Frémont	Millard Fillmore (American) (Note: After the collapse of the Whig Party in the mid-1850s, the Republican Party and the American Party (the political organization of the Know Nothing movement) emerged as the major challengers to the Democratic Party. By 1856, neither the Republican nor the American Party had truly supplanted the Whig Party as the second major political party in the United States. Nonetheless, the American Party is frequently described as a third party. After the 1856 election, the Republican Party firmly established itself as one of the two major parties alongside the Democratic Party, while the American Party collapsed.)	
1860	Stephen A. Douglas (Note: The Democratic Party fractured along sectional lines in 1860 and held multiple national conventions. The Northern Democrats nominated Stephen A. Douglas and the Southern Democrats nominated John C. Breckinridge. Many sources consider Breckinridge to be a third party candidate, but other sources do not.)	**Abraham Lincoln**†	John C. Breckinridge↑ (Southern Democratic) John Bell (Constitutional Union)	
1864	George B. McClellan	**Abraham Lincoln**† (Note: Hoping to rally War Democrats and other unionists during the American Civil War, the Republican Party campaigned as the National Union Party in the 1864 election.)		
1868	Horatio Seymour	**Ulysses S. Grant**†		
1872	Horace Greeley (Note: Greeley and his running mate, Benjamin Gratz Brown, were originally nominated by the Liberal Republican Party, a splinter group of Republicans opposed to President Ulysses S. Grant. The Liberal Republican ticket was later nominated by the 1872 Democratic National Convention, as the Democrats hoped to defeat President Grant's re-election bid by uniting with the Liberal Republicans. Greeley died after election day but before the Electoral College cast its votes, and thus did not receive any electoral votes. Most of the electoral votes that he would have received had he lived instead went to Democrat Thomas A. Hendricks.)	**Ulysses S. Grant**†	Thomas A. Hendricks (Democratic) Benjamin Gratz Brown (Liberal Republican) Charles J. Jenkins (Democratic) David Davis (Liberal Republican)	Charles O'Conor (Straight-Out Democratic)
1876	Samuel J. Tilden‡ (Note: Though other losing candidates have won a plurality of the popular vote, Tilden is the only candidate in American history to lose a presidential election despite receiving a majority of the popular vote.)	**Rutherford B. Hayes**†		Peter Cooper (Greenback)
1880	Winfield Scott Hancock	**James A. Garfield**†		James B. Weaver (Greenback); Neal Dow (Prohibition)
1884	**Grover Cleveland**†	James G. Blaine		John St. John (Prohibition); Benjamin Butler (Greenback/Anti-Monopoly)
1888	Grover Cleveland‡	**Benjamin Harrison**†		Clinton B. Fisk (Prohibition); Alson Streeter (Union Labor)
1892	**Grover Cleveland**†	Benjamin Harrison	James B. Weaver (Populist)	John Bidwell (Prohibition); Simon Wing (Socialist Labor)
1896	William Jennings Bryan (Note: In 1896, after Bryan won the Democratic presidential nomination, he was also nominated by the Populist Party, a major third party. Bryan's running mate on the Democratic ticket, Arthur Sewall, won 149 electoral votes for vice president, while his running mate on the Populist ticket, Thomas E. Watson, won 27 electoral votes for vice president.)	**William McKinley**†		John M. Palmer (National Democratic); Joshua Levering (Prohibition); Charles H. Matchett (Socialist Labor); Charles E. Bentley (National Prohibition)
1900	William Jennings Bryan	**William McKinley**†		John G. Woolley (Prohibition); Eugene V. Debs (Social Democratic); Wharton Barker (Populist); Joseph F. Maloney (Socialist Labor)
1904	Alton B. Parker	**Theodore Roosevelt**†		Eugene V. Debs (Socialist); Silas C. Swallow (Prohibition); Thomas E. Watson (Populist); Charles H. Corregan (Socialist Labor)
1908	William Jennings Bryan	**William Howard Taft**†		Eugene V. Debs (Socialist); Eugene W. Chafin (Prohibition); Thomas L. Hisgen (Independence); Thomas E. Watson (Populist)
1912	**Woodrow Wilson**†	William Howard Taft	Theodore Roosevelt↑ (Progressive)	Eugene V. Debs (Socialist); Eugene W. Chafin (Prohibition); Arthur E. Reimer (Socialist Labor)
1916	**Woodrow Wilson**†	Charles Evans Hughes		Allan L. Benson (Socialist); Frank Hanly (Prohibition)
1920	James M. Cox	**Warren G. Harding**†		Eugene V. Debs (Socialist); Parley P. Christensen (Farmer-Labor); Aaron Watkins (Prohibition); James E. Ferguson (American); William Wesley Cox (Socialist Labor)
1924	John W. Davis	**Calvin Coolidge**†	Robert M. La Follette (Progressive)	Herman P. Faris (Prohibition); William Z. Foster (Communist); Frank T. Johns (Socialist Labor)
1928	Al Smith	**Herbert Hoover**†		Norman Thomas (Socialist); William Z. Foster (Communist)
1932	**Franklin D. Roosevelt**†	Herbert Hoover		Norman Thomas (Socialist); William Z. Foster (Communist); William D. Upshaw (Prohibition); William Hope Harvey (Liberty)
1936	**Franklin D. Roosevelt**†	Alf Landon		William Lemke (Union); Norman Thomas (Socialist); Earl Browder (Communist)
1940	**Franklin D. Roosevelt**†	Wendell Willkie		Norman Thomas (Socialist); Roger W. Babson (Prohibition); Earl Browder (Communist)
1944	**Franklin D. Roosevelt**†	Thomas E. Dewey		Norman Thomas (Socialist); Claude A. Watson (Prohibition)
1948	**Harry S. Truman**†	Thomas E. Dewey	Strom Thurmond (Dixiecrat)	Henry A. Wallace (Progressive); Norman Thomas (Socialist); Claude A. Watson (Prohibition)
1952	Adlai Stevenson II	**Dwight D. Eisenhower**†		Vincent Hallinan (Progressive); Stuart Hamblen (Prohibition)
1956	Adlai Stevenson II	**Dwight D. Eisenhower**†	Walter Burgwyn Jones* (Dixiecrat)	T. Coleman Andrews (Dixiecrat)
1960	**John F. Kennedy**†	Richard Nixon	Harry F. Byrd* (Democratic) (Note: Byrd did not campaign in the 1960 election, and he tacitly supported the candidacy of Republican Richard Nixon. Nonetheless, he received 14 electoral votes from unpledged electors in Mississippi and Alabama, as well as 1 electoral vote from a faithless elector in Oklahoma.)	
1964	**Lyndon B. Johnson**†	Barry Goldwater		
1968	Hubert Humphrey	**Richard Nixon**†	George Wallace (American Independent)	
1972	George McGovern	**Richard Nixon**†	John Hospers* (Libertarian)	John G. Schmitz (American Independent); Linda Jenness (Socialist Workers); Benjamin Spock (People's Party)
1976	**Jimmy Carter**†	Gerald Ford	Ronald Reagan* (Republican)	Eugene McCarthy (Independent); Roger MacBride (Libertarian); Lester Maddox (American Independent); Thomas J. Anderson (American); Peter Camejo (Socialist Workers)
1980	Jimmy Carter	**Ronald Reagan**†		John B. Anderson (Independent); Ed Clark (Libertarian); Barry Commoner (Citizens)
1984	Walter Mondale	**Ronald Reagan**†		David Bergland (Libertarian)
1988	Michael Dukakis	**George H. W. Bush**†	Lloyd Bentsen* (Democratic)	Ron Paul (Libertarian); Lenora Fulani (New Alliance)
1992	**Bill Clinton**†	George H. W. Bush		Ross Perot (Independent); Andre Marrou (Libertarian); Bo Gritz (Populist)
1996	**Bill Clinton**†	Bob Dole		Ross Perot (Reform); Ralph Nader (Green); Harry Browne (Libertarian); Howard Phillips (Taxpayers); John Hagelin (Natural Law)
2000	Al Gore‡	**George W. Bush**†		Ralph Nader (Green); Pat Buchanan (Reform); Harry Browne (Libertarian)
2004	John Kerry	**George W. Bush**†	John Edwards* (Democratic)	Ralph Nader (Independent/Reform); Michael Badnarik (Libertarian); Michael Peroutka (Constitution); David Cobb (Green)
2008	**Barack Obama**†	John McCain		Ralph Nader (Independent); Bob Barr (Libertarian); Chuck Baldwin (Constitution); Cynthia McKinney (Green)
2012	**Barack Obama**†	Mitt Romney		Gary Johnson (Libertarian); Jill Stein (Green)
2016	Hillary Clinton‡	**Donald Trump**†	Colin Powell* (Republican) John Kasich* (Republican) Ron Paul* (Republican) Bernie Sanders* (Independent) Faith Spotted Eagle* (Democratic)	Gary Johnson (Libertarian); Jill Stein (Green); Evan McMullin (Independent); Darrell Castle (Constitution)
2020	**Joe Biden**†	Donald Trump		Jo Jorgensen (Libertarian); Howie Hawkins (Green)
2024	Kamala Harris	**Donald Trump**†		Jill Stein (Green); Robert F. Kennedy Jr. (Independent) (Note: Kennedy had withdrawn from the presidential race on August 23, 2024 and endorsed Republican Donald Trump.); Chase Oliver (Libertarian)
2028	TBD	TBD	TBD	

== See also ==
- Third party and independent candidates for the 2020 United States presidential election
- List of Democratic Party presidential primaries
- List of Republican Party presidential primaries
- List of United States major party presidential tickets
- List of United States major third party and independent presidential tickets
- List of United States presidential candidates by number of votes received
- List of presidential nominating conventions in the United States
- 2028 United States presidential election
