= 1844 Whig National Convention =

U.S. political event held in Baltimore, Maryland

- 1844 presidential election
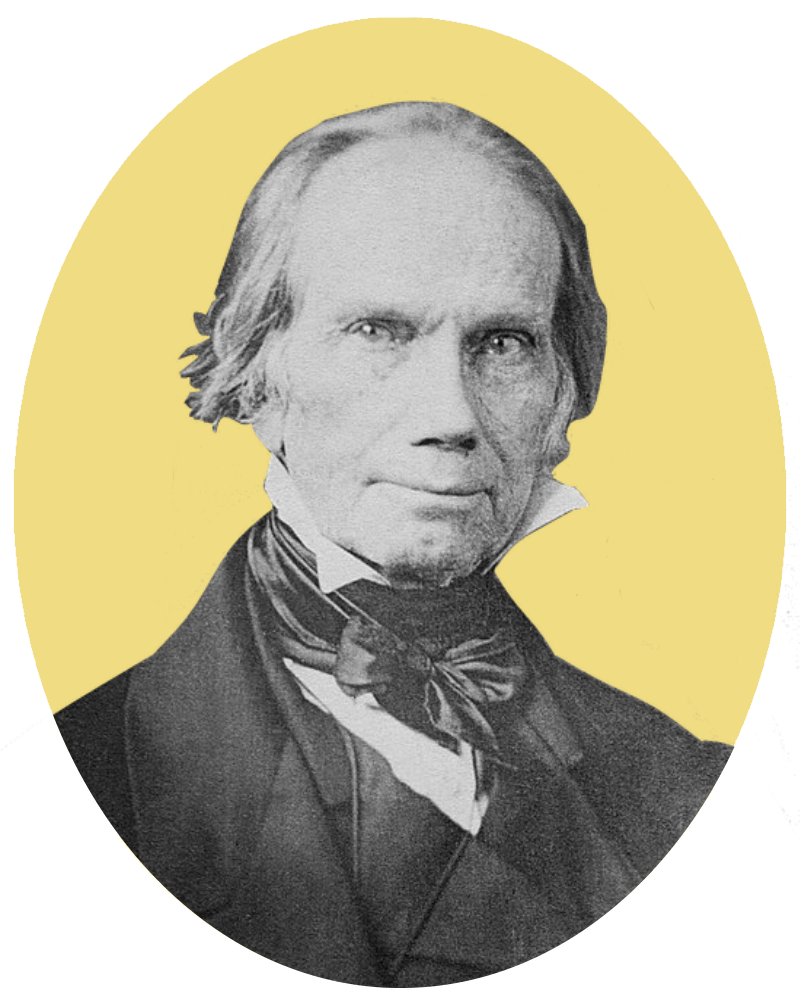
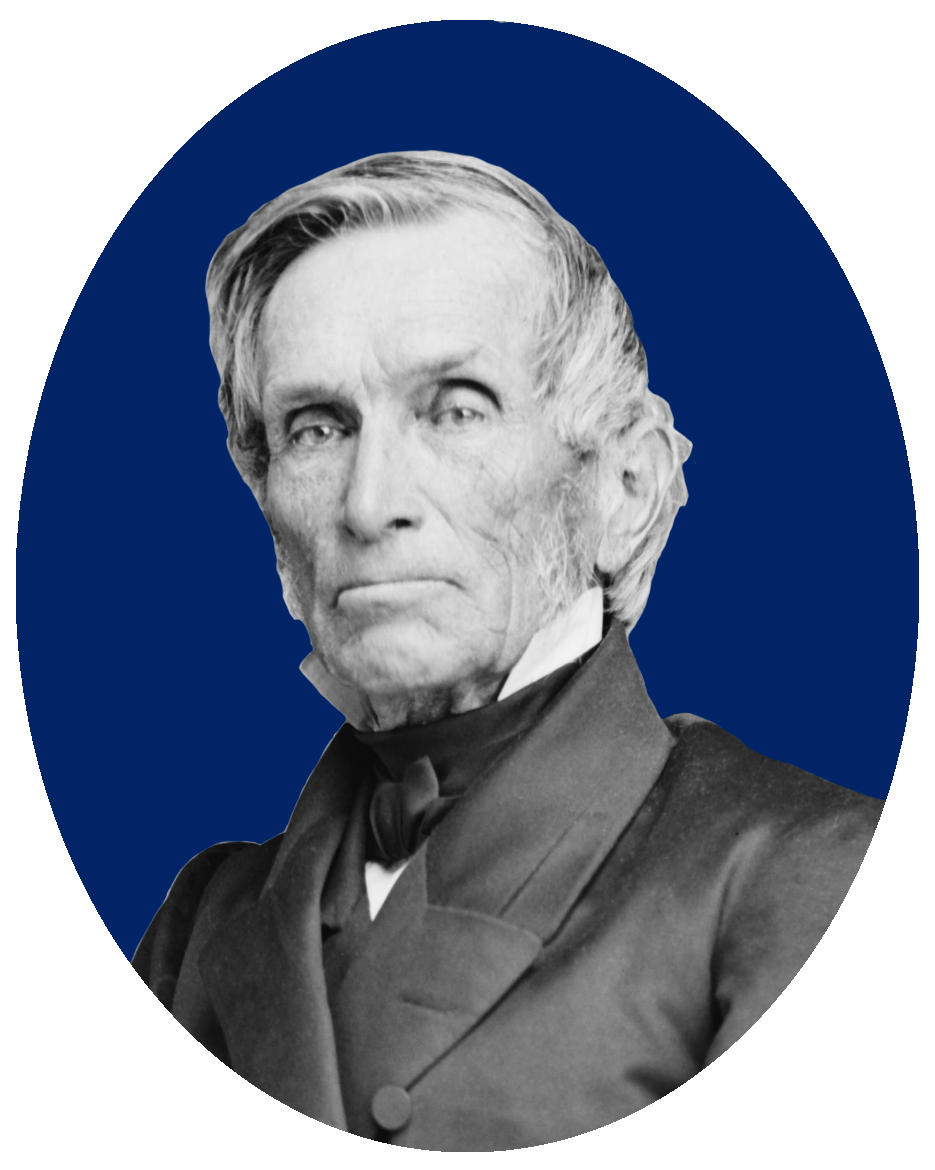
- Nominees; Clay and Frelinghuysen

Convention
- Dates: May 1, 1844
- City: Baltimore, Maryland
- Venue: Universalist Church

Candidates
- Presidential nominee: Henry Clay of Kentucky
- Vice-presidential nominee: Theodore Frelinghuysen of New Jersey

Voting
- Total delegates: 275
- Votes needed for nomination: 138
- Ballots: 1

The 1844 Whig National Convention was a presidential nominating convention held on May 1, 1844, at Universalist Church in Baltimore, Maryland. It nominated the Whig Party's candidates for president and vice president in the 1844 election. The convention selected former Senator Henry Clay of Kentucky for president and former Senator Theodore Frelinghuysen of New Jersey for vice president.

While the Whigs had won the 1840 presidential election, the party needed a new ticket as President William Henry Harrison had died in April 1841 while his successor, John Tyler, had been expelled from the party in September 1841 for vetoing bills passed by the Whig-controlled Congress. The convention unanimously nominated Clay, a long-time party leader, for president. Frelinghuysen won the vice presidential nomination on the third ballot, defeating former Governor John Davis of Massachusetts and two other candidates. The Whig ticket went on to lose the 1844 general election to the Democratic ticket of James K. Polk and George M. Dallas.

== Convention chairman ==
Ambrose Spencer served as chairman of the convention, taking over from Arthur S. Hopkins, who was temporary chairman in the early stages of planning.

== Presidential nomination ==
President John Tyler had been expelled from the party and the delegates searched for a new nominee. President Tyler's break with the Whig Party, combined with Daniel Webster's decision to serve in the Tyler administration, positioned Clay as the leading contender for the Whig nomination in the 1844 presidential election. At the convention, Clay was nominated unanimously.

=== Nomination ===
Presidential nomination
Resolution	Voice vote
Resolved, That this convention do unanimously nominate and recommend to the people of the United States, Henry Clay, of Kentucky, for next President of the United States.	Yes

== Vice presidential nomination ==
=== Candidates ===
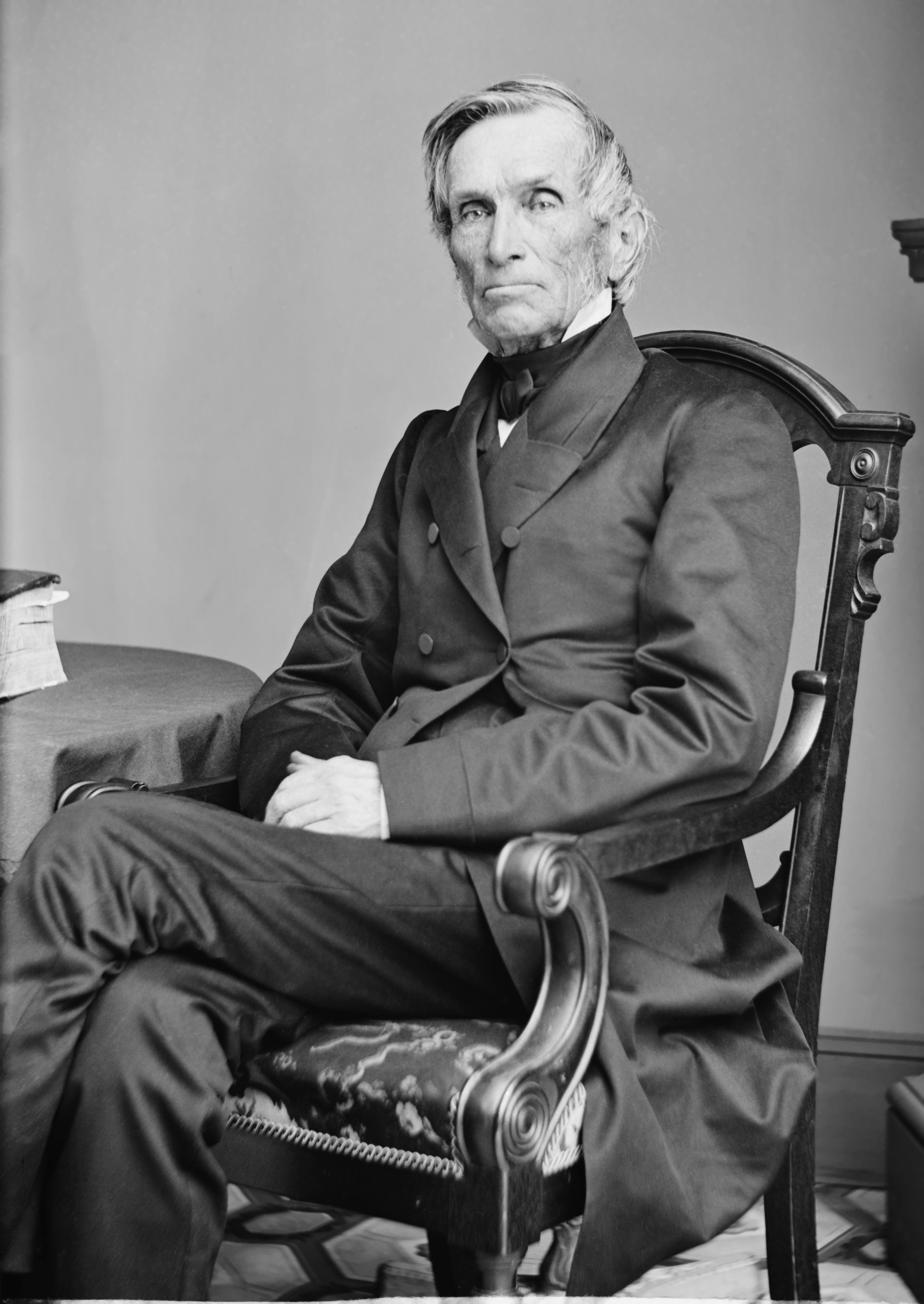
Former Mayor
Theodore Frelinghuysen
of New Jersey

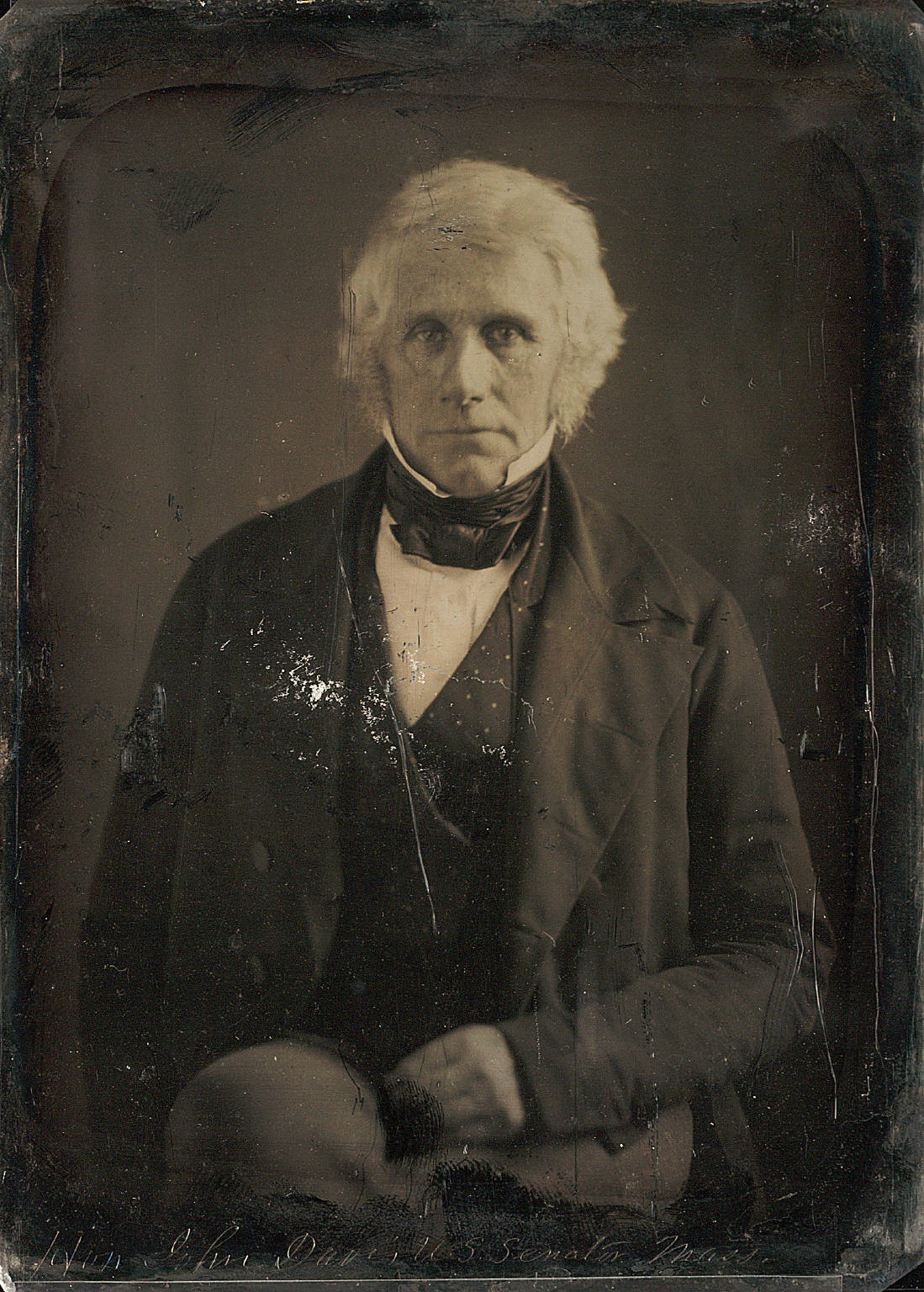
Governor
John Davis
of Massachusetts

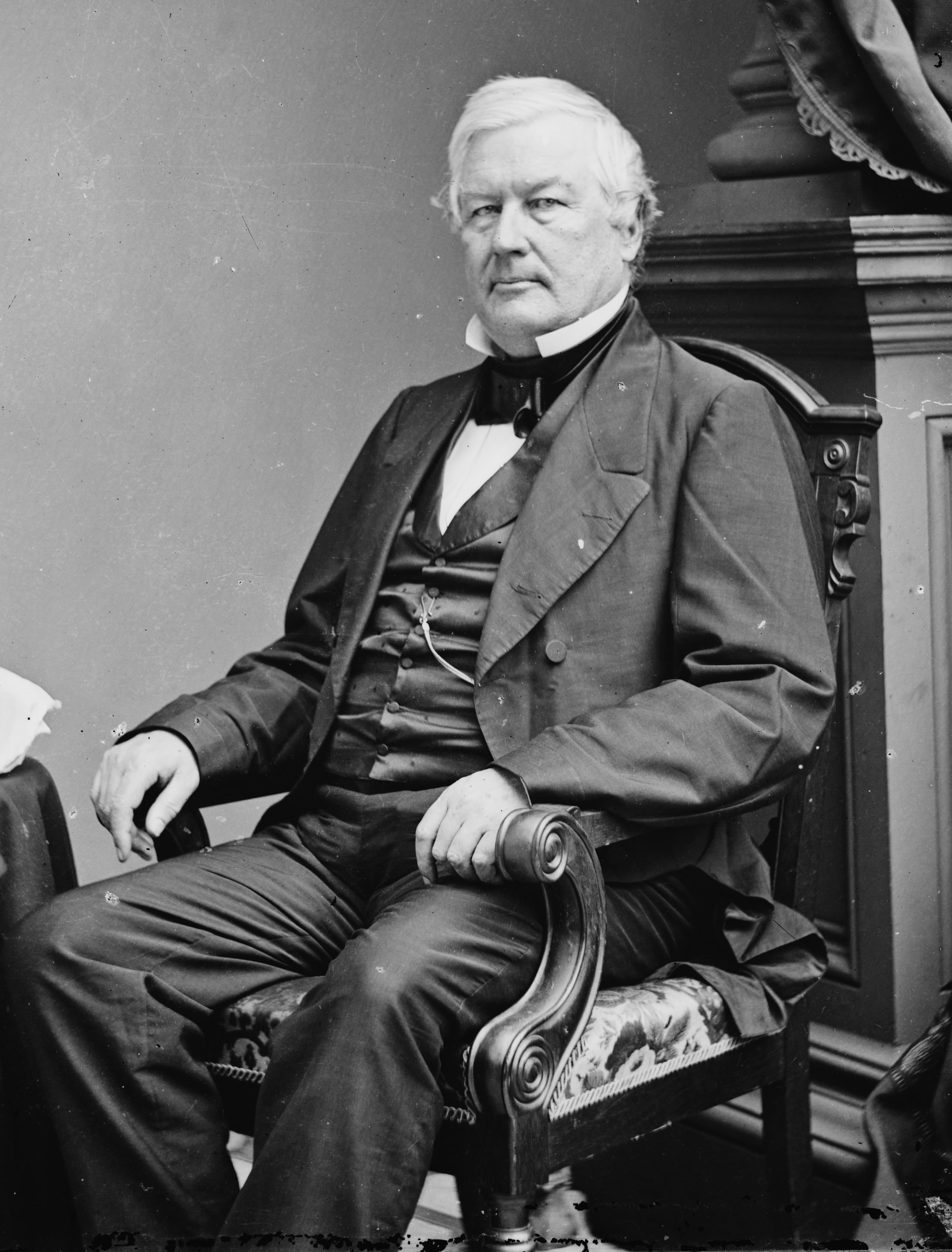
Former Representative
Millard Fillmore
of New York

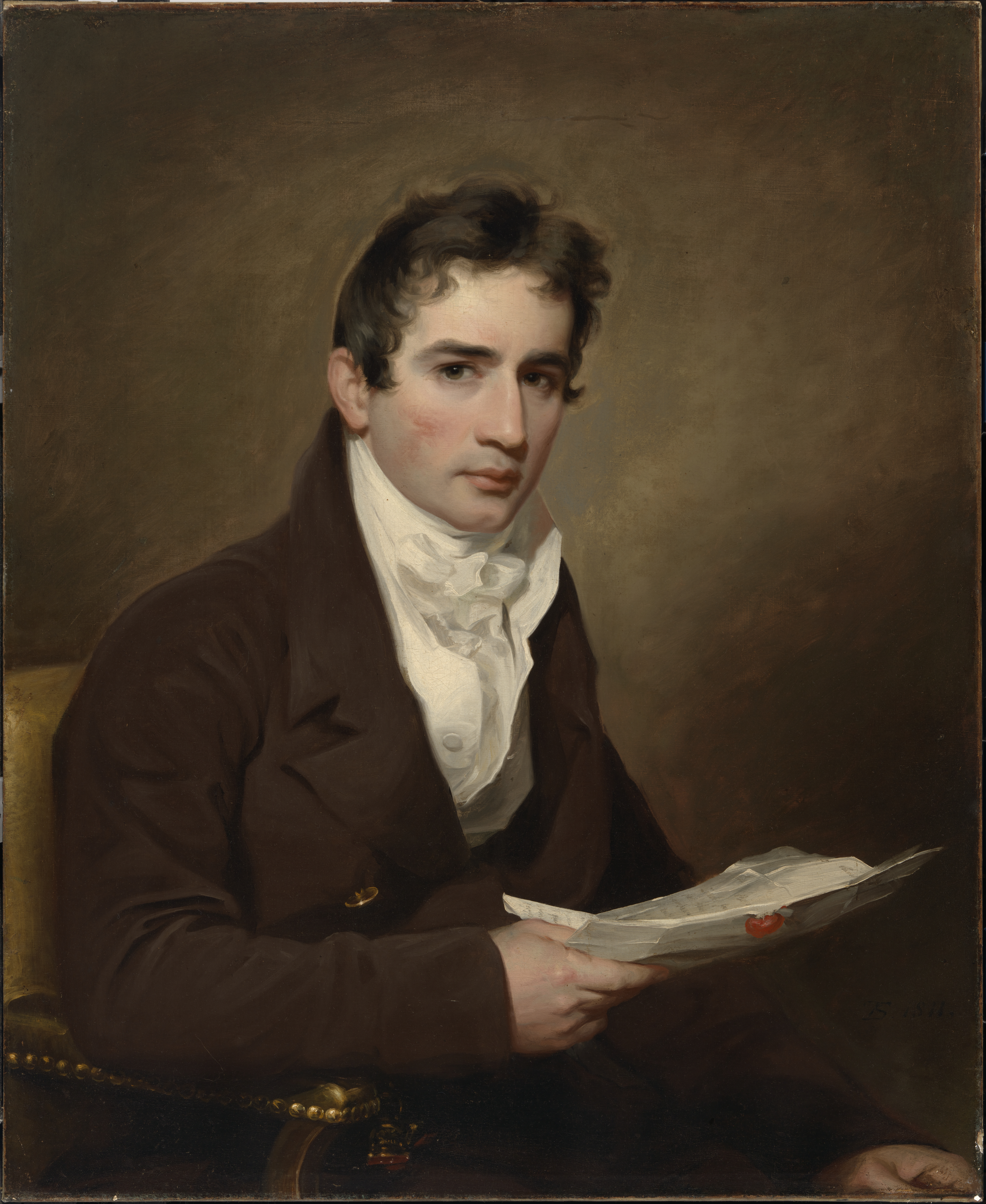
Former Representative
John Sergeant
of Pennsylvania

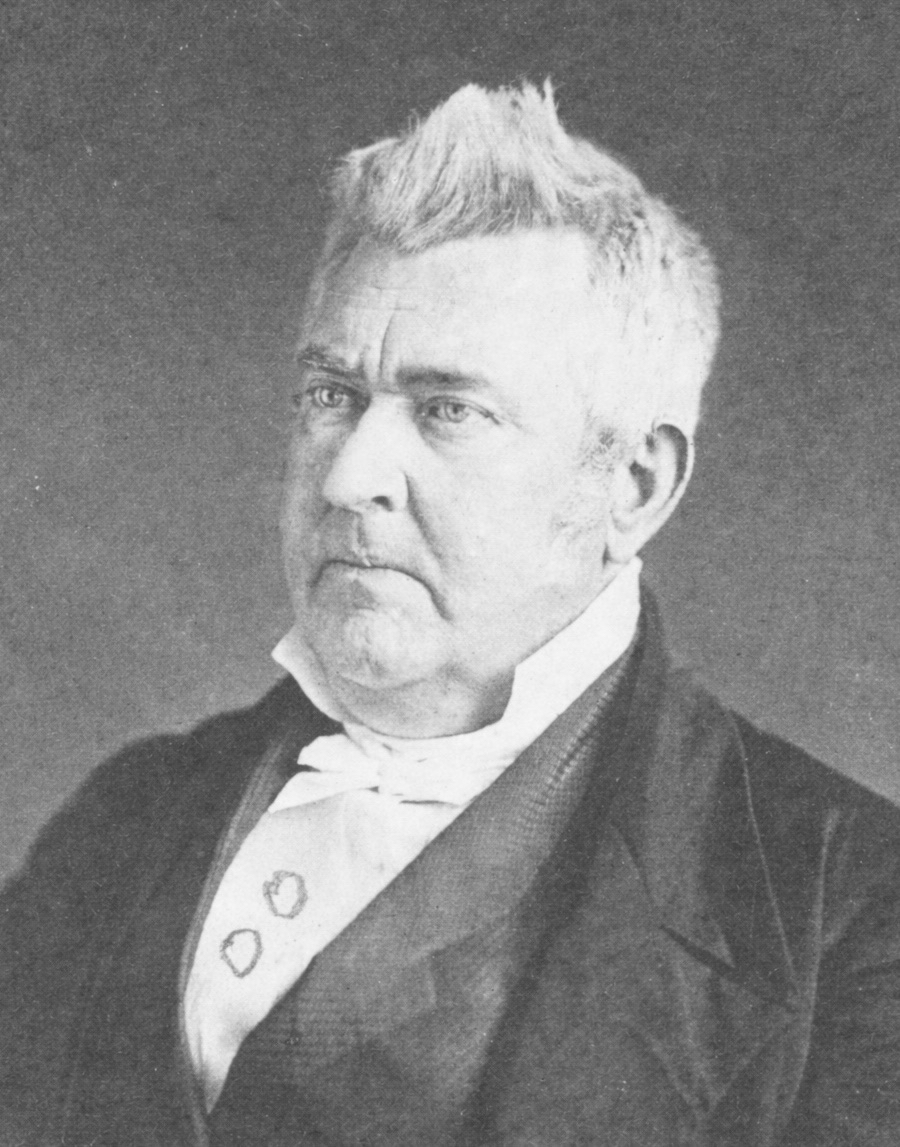
Former Senator
John M. Clayton
of Delaware
(Withdrawn)

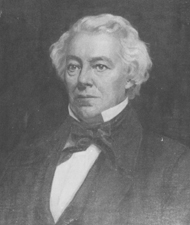
Senator
George Evans
of Maine
(Withdrawn)

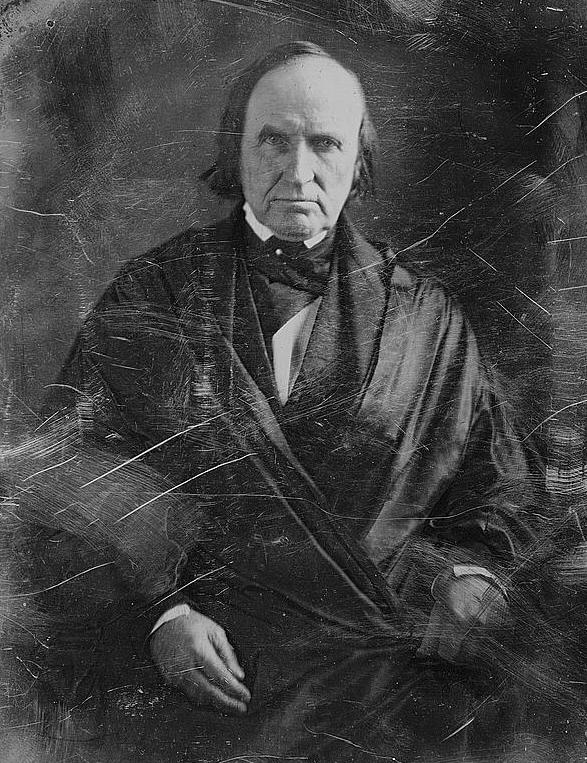
Associate Justice John McLean of Ohio (Withdrawn)

Clayton, Evans, and McLean withdrew themselves from consideration before the first round of balloting had commenced. After three rounds of voting, Theodore Frelinghuysen – "the Christian Statesman" – was selected as Clay's running mate. An advocate of colonization of emancipated slaves, he was acceptable to southern Whigs as an opponent of the abolitionists. His pious reputation balanced Clay's image as a slave-holding, hard-drinking duelist. Their party slogan was the bland "Hurray, Hurray, the Country's Risin' – Vote for Clay and Frelinghuysen!"

=== Nomination ===
Vice presidential nomination (Note: Most sources show 155 votes for Frelinghuysen on the third and final ballot; however, detailed state results published by the New-York Daily Tribune and the Vermont Phoenix add up to 154.)
Candidate	1st	2nd	3rd
Theodore Frelinghuysen of New Jersey	101	118	154
John Davis of Massachusetts	83	73	79
Millard Fillmore of New York	53	51	40
John Sergeant of Pennsylvania	38	32	—N/a
Total	275	275	273
Majority	138	138	137
Not voting	—N/a	—N/a	2

=== Maps ===
1st vice presidential ballot: results by state

2nd vice presidential ballot: results by state

3rd vice presidential ballot: results by state

== Platform ==
Clay, a slaveholder, presided over a party in which its Southern wing was sufficiently committed to the national platform to put partisan loyalties above slavery expansionist proposals that might undermine its north–south alliance. The Whig party leadership was acutely aware that any proslavery legislation advanced by its southern wing would alienate its anti-slavery northern wing and cripple the party in the general election. In order to preserve their party, Whigs would need to stand squarely against acquiring a new slave state. As such, Whigs were content to restrict their 1844 campaign platform to less divisive issues such as internal improvements and national finance. Clay himself had previously stated that he was opposed to the annexation of Texas.

== See also ==
- List of Whig National Conventions
- U.S. presidential nomination convention
- 1844 United States presidential election
- 1844 Democratic National Convention

== Bibliography ==
- Haynes, Stan M. (2012). The First American Political Conventions: Transforming Presidential Nominations, 1832–1872. Jefferson, NC: McFarland and Company.
- Holt, Michael F. (1999). The Rise and Fall of the American Whig Party: Jacksonian Politics and the Onset of the Civil War. New York: Oxford University Press.
