= 1856 Whig National Convention =

U.S. political event held in Baltimore, Maryland

- 1856 presidential election
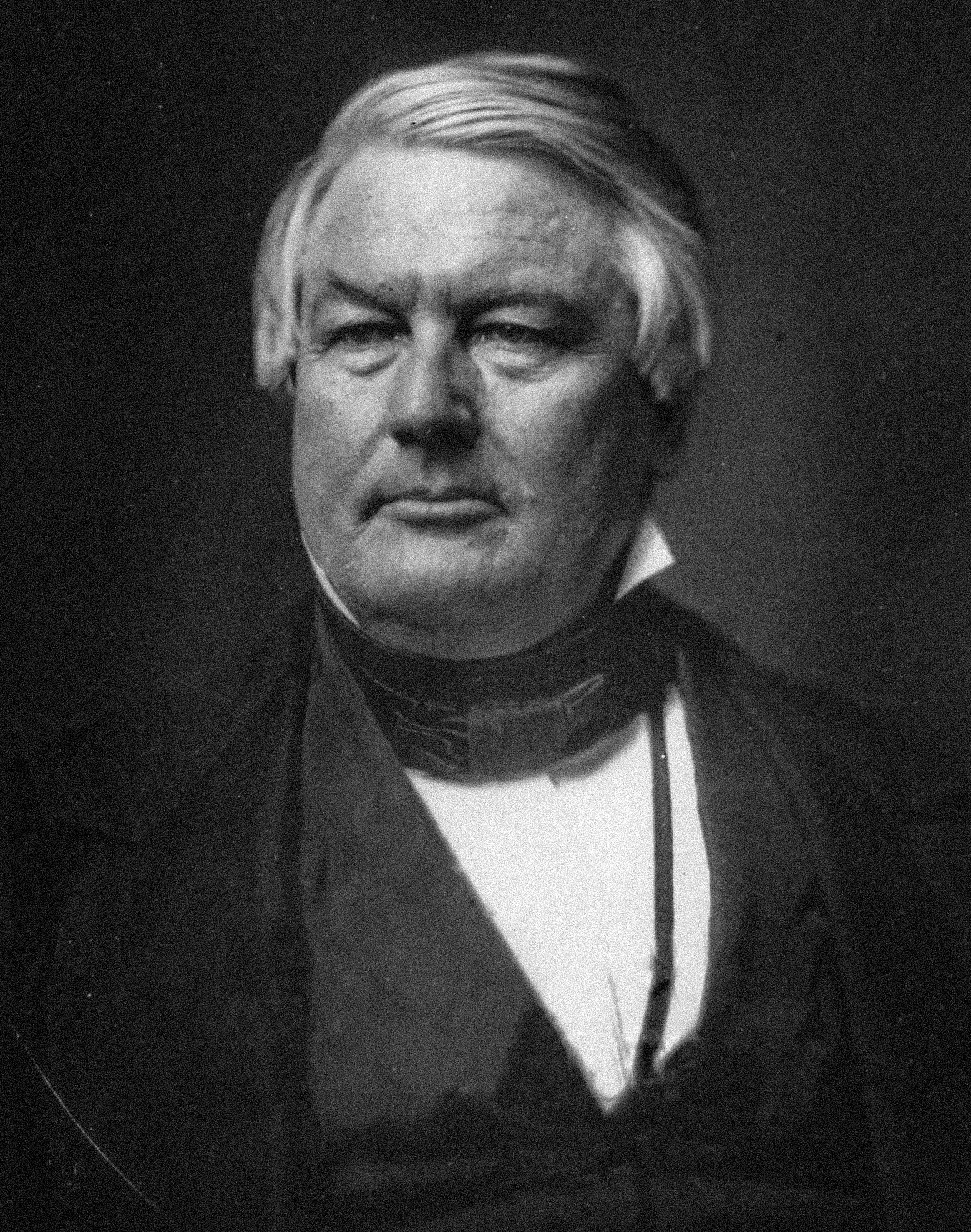
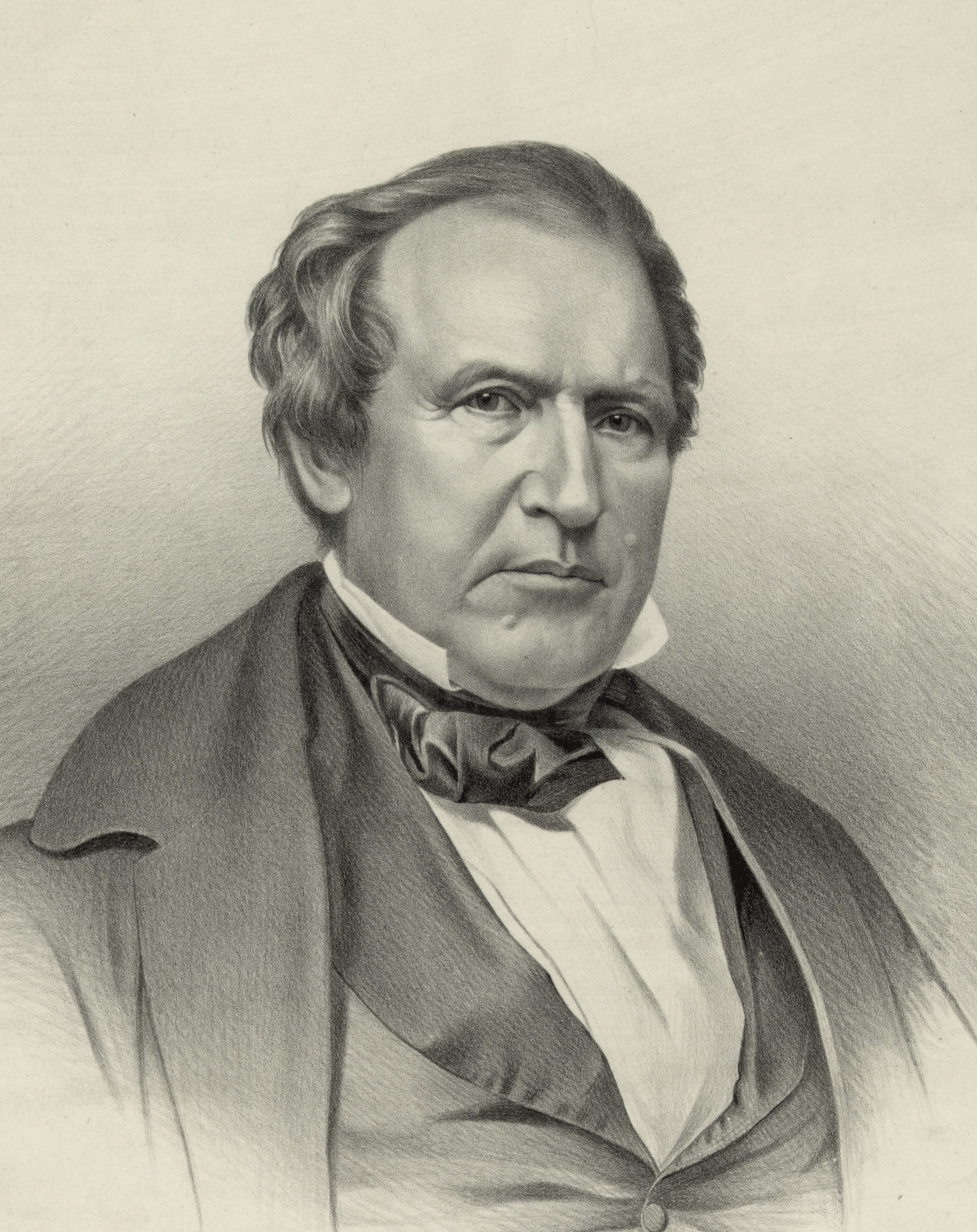
- Nominees; Fillmore and Donelson

Convention
- Date(s): September 17–18, 1856
- City: Baltimore, Maryland
- Venue: Maryland Institute
- Chair: Edward Bates

Candidates
- Presidential nominee: Millard Fillmore of New York
- Vice-presidential nominee: Andrew J. Donelson of Tennessee

Voting
- Total delegates: 150
- Votes needed for nomination: 76
- Results (president): Fillmore (NY): 150 (100%)
- Ballots: 1

The 1856 Whig National Convention was a presidential nominating convention held from September 17 to September 18, in Baltimore, Maryland. Attended by a rump group of Whigs who had not yet left the declining party, the 1856 convention was the last presidential nominating convention held by the Whig Party. The convention nominated a ticket consisting of former president Millard Fillmore and former ambassador Andrew J. Donelson; both had previously been nominated by the 1856 American National Convention. The Whig ticket finished third in the 1856 presidential election behind the winning Democratic ticket of James Buchanan and John C. Breckinridge and the runner-up Republican ticket of John C. Frémont and William L. Dayton.

== Fall of the Whigs ==
The Whig party had been declining in power for some time before its last national convention in 1856. In the 1850 midterm elections, Democrats strengthened their majority as the Whigs lost 23 seats in the House and 2 seats in the Senate. In 1852, the Whigs lost another 14 House seats and one Senate seat. Furthermore, they lost the 1852 presidential election, their third loss in five campaigns.

A major reason for the Whig party's decline was a loss of its most influential leaders. Two of its most key founding members, Henry Clay and Daniel Webster, had both died in 1852. Whig leaders from Southern slave states joined the Democratic party. Additionally, the Whigs' New York state convention in Syracuse voted to join with the newly formed Republican Party.

On March 10, 1856, the Whig National Committee met and voted to reject the New York Whigs' merger with the Republican party. Whig leaders from Kentucky met and held their state convention in April. There they voted to call a national convention.

In the months leading up to the national convention, Whigs met in convention in several states to select which delegates would be sent to Baltimore in September. Delegates to these state conventions debated several options for the upcoming general election: the party could choose former President Millard Fillmore as its candidate, nominate another Whig, or endorse the Democratic candidate James Buchanan. As the state conventions met, Fillmore emerged as the clear choice.

== Convention site ==
The convention was held at the 1851 landmark Maryland Institute for the Promotion of the Mechanic Arts over the old Centre ("Marsh") Market in Market Place (formerly Harrison Street) between East Baltimore Street and Water Street along South Gay Street and the west bank of the Jones Falls stream through downtown Baltimore, in Maryland on September 17 and September 18, 1856. The same site had hosted the 1852 Whig National Convention.

== Convention ==
Twenty-six states out of thirty-one sent 150 delegates to the national convention in late September 1856. The convention met for only two days and on the second day (and only ballot) quickly nominated Fillmore for president, who had already been nominated for president by the Know Nothing party. Andrew J. Donelson was nominated for vice president.

Among the delegates to the convention was John Bell of Tennessee.

=== Results ===
Candidates
| Name | Millard Fillmore |
| Party | Whig |
| Certified Votes | 150 (100.00%) |
| Margin | 0 (0.00%) |
