= 1831 National Republican National Convention =

- 1832 presidential election
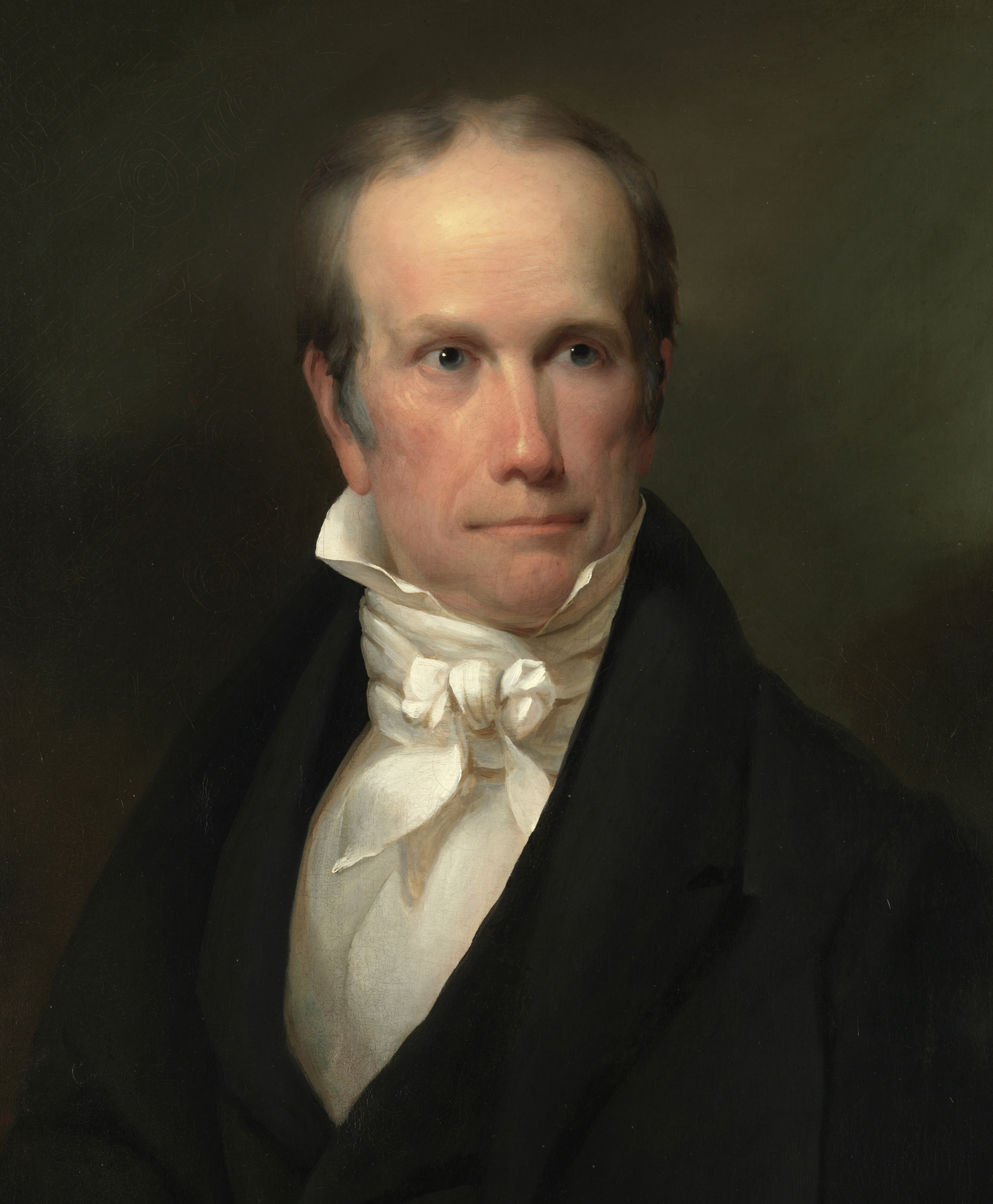
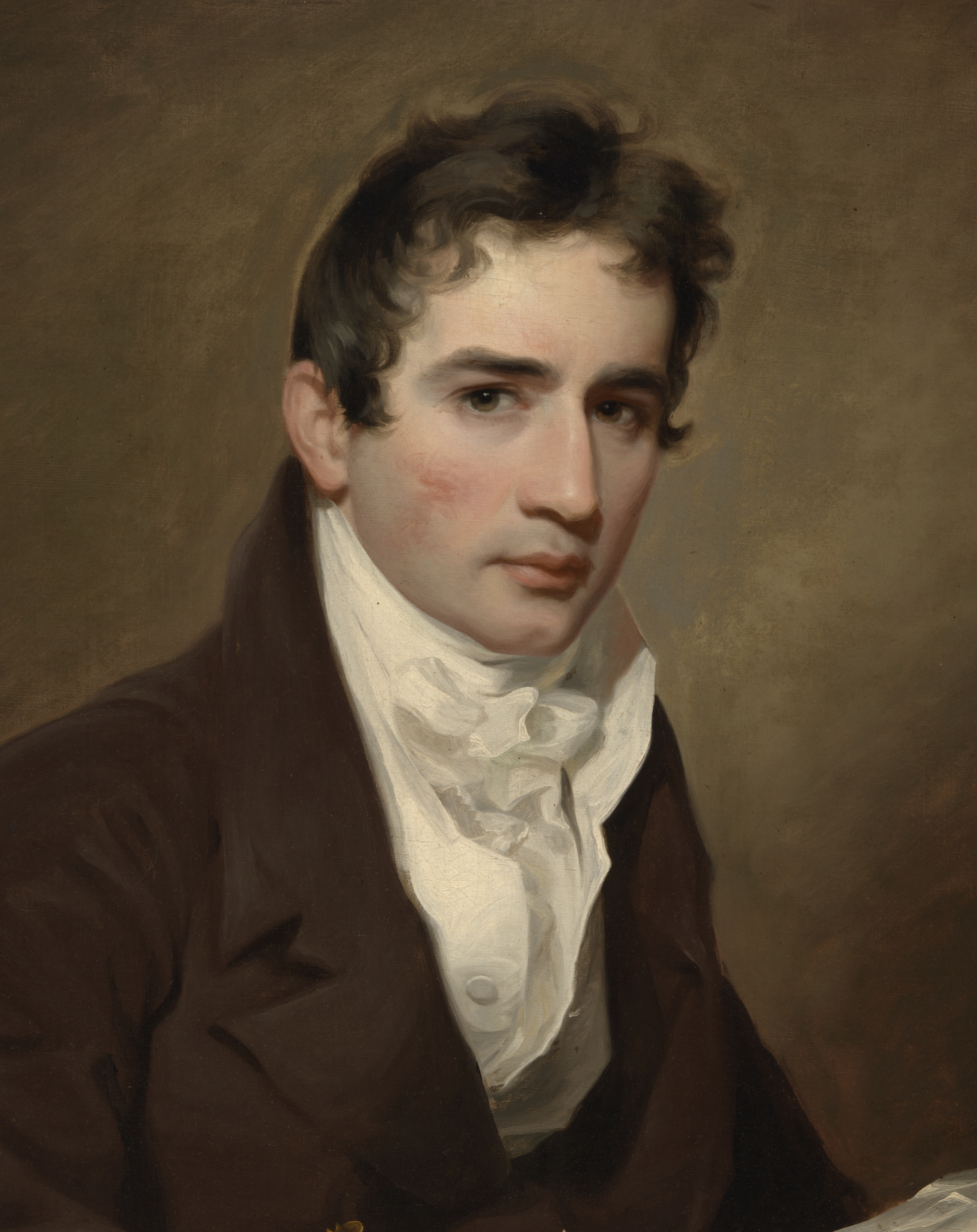
- Nominees; Clay and Sergeant

Convention
- Date(s): 12–15 December 1831
- City: Baltimore, Maryland

Candidates
- Presidential nominee: Henry Clay of Kentucky
- Vice-presidential nominee: John Sergeant of Pennsylvania

Voting
- Total delegates: 155
- Ballots: 1

The 1831 National Republican National Convention was held to determine the presidential ticket of the National Republican Party in the 1832 United States presidential election. The convention was held in Baltimore, Maryland in December 1831. The party nominated Senator Henry Clay of Kentucky for president and former Representative John Sergeant of Pennsylvania for vice president.

In the 1832 presidential election, Clay was defeated by President Andrew Jackson of the Democratic Party. After the 1832 election, the National Republican Party, the Anti-Masonic Party, and other opponents of Jackson coalesced into the Whig Party. Thus, the 1831 convention was the only national convention ever held by the National Republican Party.

== Proceedings ==
The convention was held in Baltimore, Maryland, from 12–15 December 1831, with all states except for Tennessee present. Poor weather resulted in 130 delegates being present on the first day and delegates continued arriving after the presidential ticket was nominated. This was the only national convention held by the National Republican Party.

This was the first U.S. presidential nominating convention held by a major party, though a third party, the Anti-Masonic Party, had held a presidential nominating convention earlier in 1831. 155 delegates from 18 of the 24 states attended the convention.

A committee of five people selected James Barbour to serve as permanent chair. A motion was passed stating that the party would nominate a presidential candidate. A voice vote was held in which every delegate was asked who they supported for president; Henry Clay won with an unanimous vote. He was the first sitting member of the United States Senate to be nominated for president. Another voice vote was held for vice president in the same manner; John Sergeant won with an unanimous vote.

Charles Carroll of Carrollton, a signer of the United States Declaration of Independence, was invited, but was unable to attend due to poor health. After selecting the presidential ticket the convention goers went to Carroll's house to pay their respects.

== See also ==
- 1832 Democratic National Convention
- 1832 United States presidential election
- 1839 Whig National Convention

== Works cited ==
- Bain, Richard; Parris, Judith (1973). Convention Decisions and Voting Records. Brookings Institution. ISBN 0815707681.
