= Green C. Smith =

American politician (1826–1895)

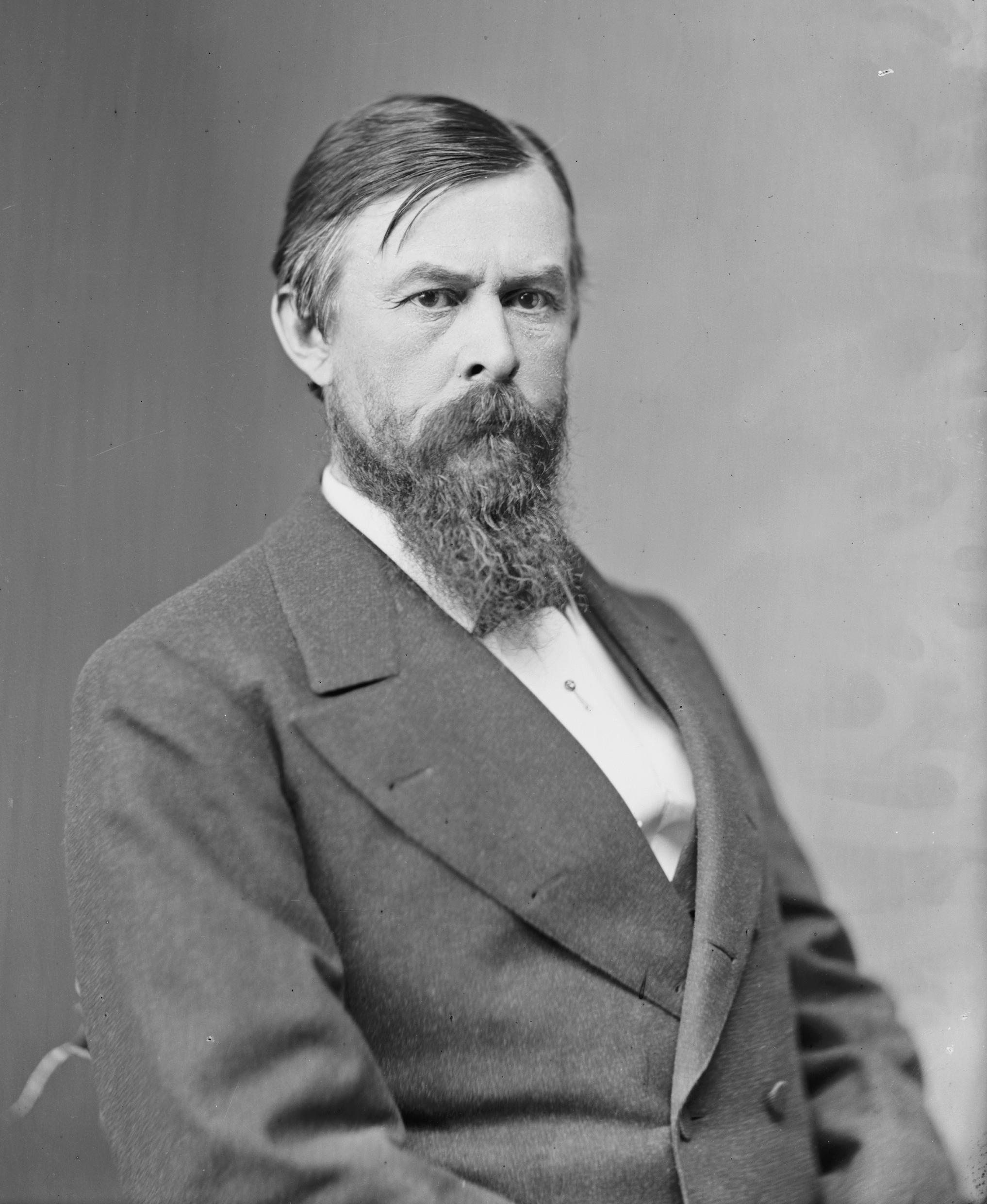
- Smith, 1865–1880

2nd Territorial Governor of Montana
- In office July 13, 1866 – April 9, 1869 (James Tufts served as acting governor from March 1869–April 9, 1869)
- Preceded by: Thomas Francis Meagher (acting)
- Succeeded by: James Mitchell Ashley

Member of the U.S. House of Representatives from Kentucky's 6th district
- In office March 4, 1863 – July 13, 1866
- Preceded by: George W. Dunlap
- Succeeded by: Andrew H. Ward

Member of the Kentucky House of Representatives from Kenton County
- In office August 5, 1861 – August 28, 1862 Serving with John W. Finnell
- Preceded by: John G. Carlisle; John Ellis
- Succeeded by: J. Crockett Sayres

Personal details
- Born: July 4, 1826 Richmond, Kentucky, U.S.
- Died: June 29, 1895 (aged 68) Washington, D.C., U.S.
- Resting place: Arlington National Cemetery; Arlington, Virginia, U.S.
- Party: Unconditional Union, Prohibition
- Parent: John Speed Smith (father)
- Education: Transylvania University
- Profession: Politician; lawyer; pastor

Green Clay Smith (July 4, 1826 – June 29, 1895) was a United States soldier and politician. Elected to the Kentucky state house before the American Civil War, he was commissioned as a Union officer when he volunteered, advancing to the rank of brigadier general before he resigned to go to Congress. He was promoted to major general by brevet on March 13, 1865. He was elected to the US Congress from Kentucky in 1862, representing the Unconditional Union Party and serving until 1866.

That year, Smith was appointed as the Territorial Governor of Montana, serving from 1866 to 1869. He returned to Washington, D.C., where he was ordained as a Baptist minister and became active in the temperance movement.

== Biography ==
Smith was born in 1826 in Richmond, Kentucky, to John Speed Smith and his wife Elizabeth Lewis (Clay) Smith (1798–1887) as the third of seven children. He was named for his maternal grandfather, Green Clay, a very wealthy planter and slaveholder in Kentucky and a prominent politician. His siblings included Sally Ann Lewis (1818–1875), named for her maternal grandmother; Curran Cassius, Pauline Green, Junius Brutus (never married), Mary Spencer (never married), and John Speed Jr.

Smith's father was elected to the Kentucky legislature and the U.S. House of Representatives. His mother's younger brothers, Brutus J. Clay and Cassius M. Clay, both became state politicians and were later elected as members of the Unconditional Union Party to the United States Congress from Kentucky during the American Civil War. Cassius was an abolitionist before the war.

As a young man, Green Clay Smith pursued academic studies. When the U.S.-Mexican War began, he enlisted in the Army and was commissioned as a second lieutenant in the First Regiment of the Kentucky Volunteer Infantry on June 9, 1846.

Smith returned to Kentucky, where he graduated from Transylvania University in 1849, then studied law and was admitted to the bar in 1852. He began his practice in Covington. From 1853 to 1857, Smith served as a school commissioner.

== Career ==
=== Congressman ===
Smith was elected as a member of the Kentucky House of Representatives, serving from 1861 to 1863. On April 4, 1862, he was commissioned colonel of the Fourth Regiment of the Kentucky Volunteer Cavalry. He was appointed brigadier general of volunteers on June 12, 1862.

Like his uncles Brutus J. and Cassius M. Clay, Smith joined the Unconditional Union Party. In 1862, he was elected as an Unconditional Unionist to the thirty-eighth congress, resigning from his military post on December 1, 1863. He served as chairman of the Committee on Militia from 1865 to 1866. He was brevetted major general of volunteers on March 13, 1865.

=== Governor ===
Smith resigned from Congress in July 1866 when President Andrew Johnson appointed him as Territorial Governor of Montana. He served there from 1866 to 1869, working to moderate hostilities between European American settlers and the Native Americans who occupied the lands, including tribes of the Blackfoot Confederacy.

=== Pastor ===
After he resigned, Smith returned to Washington, D.C. He was ordained to the Baptist ministry and served in a number of congregations while supporting the temperance movement. He was pastor in Richmond, Mt. Sterling, Frankfort and Louisville, Kentucky. In 1890 he was called as pastor of the Metropolitan Baptist Church (now Capitol Hill Baptist Church) in Washington, D.C., which he served until his death in 1895.

=== Presidential nomination ===
In 1876, the National Prohibition Party nominated Smith for President of the United States. With his running mate, Gideon T. Stewart, the two received 9,737 popular votes in the election. Smith continued his work in religion and temperance.

== Death ==
Smith was interred in Arlington National Cemetery in Arlington, Virginia.

== See also ==
- List of American Civil War generals (Union)

U.S. House of Representatives
Preceded by George W. Dunlap	Member of the U.S. House of Representatives from Kentucky's 6th congressional district March 4, 1863 – July, 1866	Succeeded by Andrew H. Ward
Political offices
Preceded by Thomas Francis Meagher; Acting Territorial Governor	Territorial Governor of Montana; July 13, 1866 – April 9, 1869	Succeeded by James Mitchell Ashley
Party political offices
Preceded by James Black	Prohibition Party presidential nominee 1876 (lost)	Succeeded by Neal Dow
