= Gideon T. Stewart =

American journalist (1824–1909)

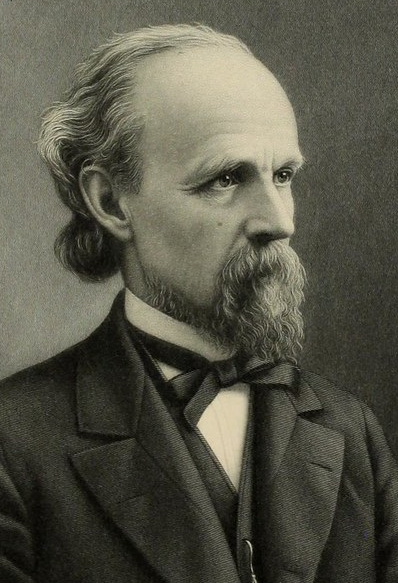
- Stewart in 1909

4th Chairman of the Prohibition Party
- In office 1880–1884
- Preceded by: James Black
- Succeeded by: John B. Finch

Huron County Auditor
- In office 1850–1856

Personal details
- Born: Gideon Tabor Stewart; August 7, 1824 Johnsontown, New York, U.S.
- Died: June 10, 1909 (aged 84) Pasadena, California, U.S.
- Party: Prohibition
- Other political affiliations: Whig; Republican
- Spouse: Abby Newell Simmons
- Children: 4
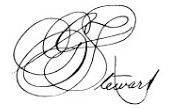
- Signature

Gideon Tabor Stewart (August 7, 1824 – June 10, 1909) was an American lawyer and politician who served as the Prohibition Party's vice presidential nominee in 1876. He was elected three times as grand worthy chief templar of the Good Templars of Ohio.

== Early life and education ==
Stewart was born on August 7, 1824, in Johnstown, New York, to Thomas and Elizabeth Ferguson Stewart. He studied at Oberlin College, but left before graduating to study law in Norwalk, Ohio. He later studied under Noah Haynes Swayne in Columbus, Ohio, for more than a year, and spent two years in Florida with his brother, before returning to Norwalk, where he was admitted to the bar in 1846. From 1850 to 1856 he served as auditor of Huron County, Ohio.

== Career ==
During the American Civil War he published Union newspapers in Iowa and then Toledo, Ohio, before returning to law practice in Norwalk in 1866. Throughout the 1850s, he attempted to organize a permanent prohibition party and in 1869 a convention was held, with Stewart as one of the delegates, that established the national Prohibition Party and he was selected as the national secretary. Afterward, he served as the party candidate three times for governor of Ohio, seven times for judge on that state's Supreme Court, once for circuit court judge, and once for congress.

During the 1876 presidential election, he received three delegate votes for the Prohibition presidential nomination and was later given the vice presidential nomination to serve alongside Green Clay Smith and received 9,737 votes. In 1880, he was selected as the national chairman of the Prohibition party. During the 1892 presidential election he ran for the Prohibition presidential nomination, but was defeated by John Bidwell with 590 delegates to 179 delegates.

== Personal life ==
In 1857, he married Abby Newell Simmons and later had four children with her.

He died at his home in Pasadena, California, from heart failure, on June 10, 1909, aged 85.

== Electoral history ==
Gideon T. Stewart electoral history

1871 Ohio gubernatorial election
Party	Candidate	Votes	%	±%
Republican	Edward Follansbee Noyes	238,273	51.75%	+1.01%
Democratic	George Wythe McCook	218,105	47.37%	+1.76%
Prohibition	Gideon T. Stewart	4,084	0.89%	+0.75%
Total votes		460,462	100.00%	

1872 Ohio Tenth Congressional District election
Party	Candidate	Votes	%	±%
Republican	Charles Foster	14,997	51.03%	+1.26%
Liberal Republican	Rush R. Sloane	14,271	48.56%	+48.56%
Democratic	Gideon T. Stewart	121	0.41%	+0.41%
Total votes		29,389	100.00%	

1873 Ohio gubernatorial election
Party	Candidate	Votes	%	±%
Democratic	William Allen	214,654	47.82%	+0.45%
Republican	Edward Follansbee Noyes	213,837	47.64%	−4.11%
Prohibition	Gideon T. Stewart	10,278	2.29%	+1.40%
Liberal Republican	Isaac C. Collins	10,109	2.25%	+2.25%
Total votes		448,878	100.00%	

1879 Ohio gubernatorial election
Party	Candidate	Votes	%	±%
Republican	Charles Foster	336,261	50.25%	+5.37%
Democratic	Thomas Ewing Jr.	319,132	47.69%	−1.25%
Greenback	Abram S. Piatt	9,072	1.36%	−0.89%
Prohibition	Gideon T. Stewart	4,145	0.62%	−0.25%
Independent	John Hood	547	0.08%	+0.08%
Total votes		669,157	100.00%	

1892 Prohibition Party presidential ballot
Party	Candidate	Votes	%
Prohibition	John Bidwell	590	64.76%
Prohibition	Gideon T. Stewart	179	19.65%
Prohibition	William Jennings Demorest	139	15.26%
Prohibition	H. Clay Bascom	3	0.33%
Total votes		911	100.00%
