= James Black (prohibitionist) =

19th-century American temperance activist and a founder of the Prohibition Party

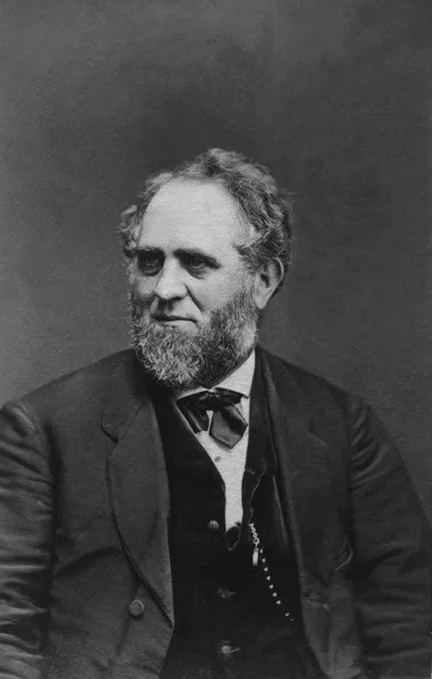

3rd Chairman of the Prohibition Party
- In office 1876–1880
- Preceded by: Simeon B. Chase
- Succeeded by: Gideon T. Stewart

Personal details
- Born: July 23, 1823 Lewisburg, Pennsylvania, U.S.
- Died: December 16, 1893 (aged 70) Lancaster, Pennsylvania, U.S.
- Party: Prohibition
- Other political affiliations: Democratic Party (before 1854); Republican Party (1854-1869)
- Spouse: Eliza Murray
- Children: 6
- Parents: John Black (father); Jane Egbert Black (mother)

James Black (September 23, 1823 – December 16, 1893) was an American temperance movement activist and a founder of the Prohibition Party. Black served as the first presidential nominee of the Prohibition Party during the 1872 presidential election.

== Biography ==
=== Early life ===
Black was born September 23, 1823, in Lewisburg, Pennsylvania, the son of John Black and Jane Egbert Black. In 1836 the family moved to the city of Lancaster, Pennsylvania, which would remain his hometown for the rest of his life. In addition to his home in the city of Lancaster, Black also had a residence in Fulton Township, Pennsylvania.

As a child he worked in a sawmill from 1836 to 1837 and worked on the Susquehanna and Tidewater Canal in 1839 before attending the Lewisburg Academy from 1841 to 1843. In 1844, Black began the study of law, passing into the Pennsylvania state bar in 1846 and setting up a legal practice in Lancaster. In 1845, he married Eliza Murray and would later have six children with her.

=== Political career ===
Black was initially a member of the Republican Party but was also deeply committed to anti-alcohol activism, having joined the Washingtonian movement while still a youth. He first joined the Democratic Party, but in 1854 he participated in the creation of the Republican party and later served as a delegate to the 1856 Republican National Convention where he voted to give John C. Frémont the Republican nomination.

Black was actively involved in establishing the Good Templars, a temperance organization. In addition, he co-founded the National Temperance Society and Publishing House with Neal Dow, another pioneering temperance leader. In its first 60 years, the publishing house printed over one billion pages. It published three monthly periodicals with a combined circulation of about 600,000. It also published over 2,000 books and pamphlets plus textbooks, flyers, broadsides and other temperance materials.

In 1869, Black and some of his friends founded the Prohibition Party in Chicago, Illinois with Black serving as president of the convention. Three years later he was selected to run as the party’s first presidential candidate, but he won no electoral votes and only 5,607 votes. During the 1872 presidential campaign it was incorrectly stated that he had endorsed the Liberal Republican presidential ticket of Horace Greeley and Benjamin Gratz Brown. From 1876 to 1880 he served as chairman of the national Prohibition committee.

=== Death and legacy ===
On December 16, 1893, Black died of pneumonia at his home in Lancaster, Pennsylvania, at age 70. The Prohibition Party still exists and was successful in achieving alcohol prohibition in the United States from 1919 to 1933.

== Works ==
- Is There a Necessity for a Prohibition Party? New York: National Temperance Society and Publication House, 1876.
- Brief History of Prohibition and of the Prohibition Reform Party. New York: National Committee of the Prohibition Reform Party, 1880.
- Hon. James Black's Cleveland address. Address delivered at the opening of the National Prohibition Reform Party Convention, held in Cleveland, Ohio, Wednesday, June, 17th, 1880. New York: Prohibition Reform Party, 1880.
- History of the National Prohibition Party. New York: National Temperance Society and Publication House, 1893.

Party political offices
| Preceded by Party founded | Prohibition Party presidential nominee 1872 (lost) | Succeeded by Green Clay Smith |
