= 1904 United States presidential election in Connecticut =

- November 8, 1904
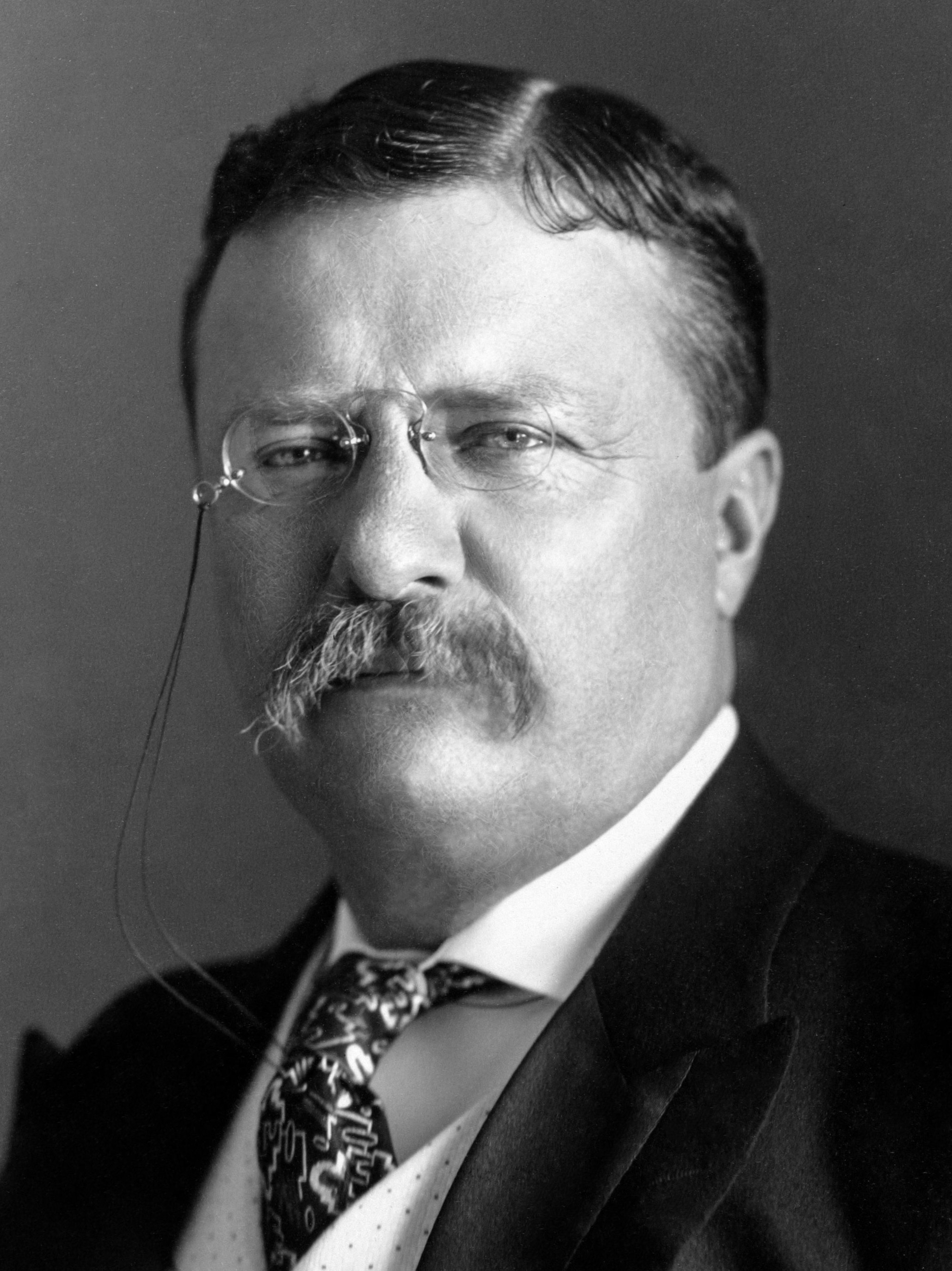

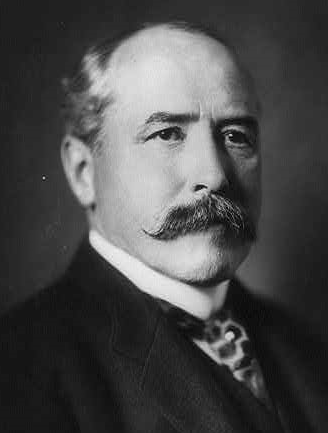
Nominee	Theodore Roosevelt	Alton B. Parker
Party	Republican	Democratic
Home state	New York	New York
Running mate	Charles W. Fairbanks	Henry G. Davis
Electoral vote	7	0
Popular vote	111,089	72,909
Percentage	58.12%	38.15%

Roosevelt
40–50%
50–60%
60–70%
70–80%
80–90%
Parker
40–50%
50–60%
60–70%
Tie
40–50%
President before election
Theodore Roosevelt
Republican
Elected President
Theodore Roosevelt
Republican

The 1904 United States presidential election in Connecticut took place on November 8, 1904, as part of the 1904 United States presidential election. Voters chose seven representatives, or electors to the Electoral College, who voted for president and vice president.

Connecticut overwhelmingly voted for the Republican nominee, President Theodore Roosevelt, over the Democratic nominee, former Chief Judge of New York Court of Appeals Alton B. Parker. Roosevelt won Connecticut by a margin of 19.97%.

== Results ==
1904 United States presidential election in Connecticut
Party	Candidate	Running mate	Popular vote		Electoral vote	
Party	Candidate	Running mate	Count	%	Count	%
Republican	Theodore Roosevelt of New York (incumbent)	Charles Warren Fairbanks of Indiana	111,089	58.12%	7	100.00%
Democratic	Alton Brooks Parker of New York	Henry Gassaway Davis of West Virginia	72,909	38.15%	0	0.00%
Socialist	Eugene Victor Debs of Indiana	Benjamin Hanford of New York	4,543	2.38%	0	0.00%
Prohibition	Silas Comfort Swallow of Pennsylvania	George Washington Carroll of Texas	1,506	0.79%	0	0.00%
Socialist Labor	Charles Hunter Corregan of New York	William Wesley Cox of Illinois	575	0.30%	0	0.00%
Populist	Thomas Edward Watson of Georgia	Thomas Tibbles of Nebraska	495	0.26%	0	0.00%
N/A	Others	Others	11	0.01%	0	0.00%
Total			191,128	100.00%	7	100.00%

== See also ==
- United States presidential elections in Connecticut
