= Newspaper endorsements in the 1904 United States presidential election =

Newspapers made endorsements of candidates in the 1904 United States presidential election. Incumbent President Theodore Roosevelt who took office after William McKinley was assassinated in 1901 was the Republican candidate, and Alton B. Parker the Democratic candidate. Harper's Weekly ran a cartoon in September 1904 called "Tom's Dream", a reference to DNC Chairman Thomas Taggart, and his hope that the major newspapers of the country would endorse Parker. His dream largely did not come true, as most newspapers endorsed Roosevelt in this election.

Newspaper	1904 Endorsement	Largest Reported Circ.	Endorsement date	State	1900 Endorsement	Notes
The Appeal (newspaper)	Theodore Roosevelt		1904	Minnesota		
The Daily Bee	Theodore Roosevelt		1904	California		
Los Angeles Times	Theodore Roosevelt		1904	California	William McKinley	
New York Herald	Alton B. Parker	75,000+	1904	New York	William McKinley	
New York World	Alton B. Parker	75,000+	1904	New York	William McKinley	
New York Evening Post	Alton B. Parker	23,487	1904	New York	William McKinley	
New York Times	Alton B. Parker	75,000+	1904	New York	William McKinley	
The Sun (New York)	Theodore Roosevelt		1904	New York		
Brooklyn Eagle	Alton B. Parker	20,000+	1904	New York	William McKinley	
Chicago Tribune	Theodore Roosevelt	75,000+	1904	Illinois	William McKinley	
Baltimore Sun	Alton B. Parker	20,000+	1904	Maryland	William Jennings Bryan	
Baltimore Afro-American Ledger	Theodore Roosevelt	2,458	1904	Maryland		Prominent weekly black newspaper
Canton Repository	Theodore Roosevelt	8,230	1904	Ohio	William McKinley	
The Arizona Republican	Theodore Roosevelt	5,820	1904	Arizona Territory	William McKinley	Did not officially endorse Roosevelt, but wrote "glowingly" about him frequently.
Puck (magazine)	Alton B. Parker		1904	New York		Humor magazine.
