= Alton B. Parker 1904 presidential campaign =

American political campaign

Alton B. Parker for President
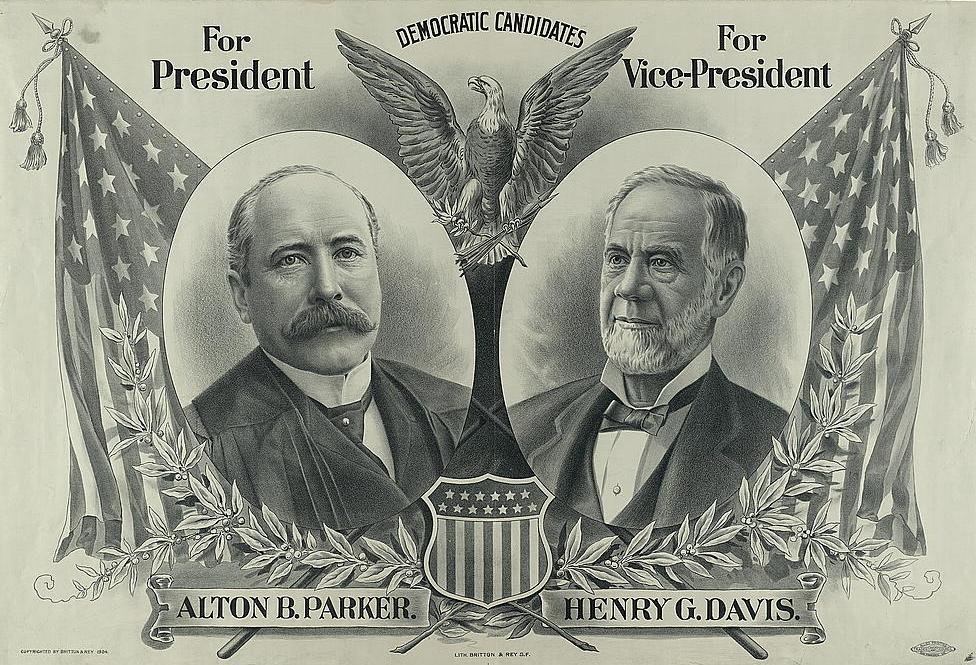
- Campaign: 1904 U.S. presidential election
- Candidate: Alton B. Parker Chief Judge of the New York Court of Appeals (1898–1904); Henry G. Davis United States Senator from West Virginia (1871–1883)
- Affiliation: Democratic Party
- Status: Lost general election

After U.S. President William McKinley was assassinated in 1901, Theodore Roosevelt became the new U.S. President. Roosevelt's first term was notable for his trust busting, his successful arbitration in and resolution of a 1902 strike of 150,000 Pennsylvania coal miners, his advocacy against lynching, his conservation efforts, and the Panama Canal Treaty. In 1904, Roosevelt easily defeated Bourbon Democrat Alton Parker and won a second term as U.S. President.

== The nomination fight ==
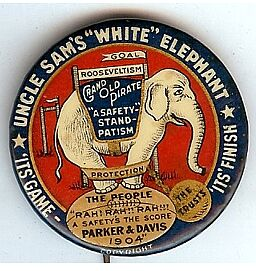
A 1904 Parker campaign button

After his two defeats in 1896 and 1900, former Congressman William Jennings Bryan rejected the idea of a third consecutive run for the White House. Meanwhile, the campaign of early front-runner Maryland Senator Arthur Pue Gorman fizzled out once he announced his opposition to the Panama Canal Treaty (a treaty which was endorsed not only by almost all U.S. Senate Republicans, but also by almost half of all U.S. Senate Democrats). After Gorman's withdrawal, former President Grover Cleveland was discussed as an ideal candidate by the conservative faction of the Democratic Party, but he preferred to remain in retirement and thus refused to run in 1904. In addition, Richard Olney, the Attorney General and Secretary of State in Cleveland's second term, who had run in the previous two elections, also chose not to run. After Bryan, Gorman, Cleveland, and Olney withdrew themselves from consideration, no prominent Democrat emerged to seek the 1904 Democratic presidential nomination. Indeed, this was caused in no small part by the widespread belief that President Roosevelt was almost guaranteed to win a second term in 1904.

The Democrats eventually united around Alton Parker, the Chief Judge of the New York Court of Appeals, as their 1904 presidential nominee. Parker had been the campaign manager for New York Governor David B. Hill in 1885 and acquired a reputation for fairness, competence, and courtesy as a judge. As a judge, his record contained evidence of deference to legislatures, strict construction, and recognition of labor rights. While he would have preferred to be appointed to the U.S. Supreme Court, he was persuaded to run for President in 1904 by David B. Hill.

Parker played well to the Democratic Party's white base by refusing to criticize the lynchings and denial of black suffrage in the South. He argued in a speech before the Georgia Bar Association that the Fourteenth Amendment to the U.S. Constitution was not originally understood as granting Congress or the Supreme Court the authority to restrict states' rights. In addition, Parker supported the gold standard and tariff reform and opposed an expansionist and imperialist foreign policy. But unlike other pro-gold standard Democrats, he had loyally supported Bryan in 1896 and had not been involved in intraparty skirmishes. While Bryan opposed Parker, he also could not find any prominent candidates to challenge him for the Democratic nomination.

While he lacked Bryan's support, newspaper mogul William Randolph Hearst ran an energetic campaign for the 1904 Democratic nomination on a Progressive platform. Indeed, Hearst spent $1.4 million of his own money (equivalent to $49 million in 2024) on his campaign. His bid failed because his views were contrary to the general direction of the party that year, other politicians were alienated by his arrogance, and his morals offended many of Bryan's supporters. Thus, Parker was able to win the nomination on the first ballot at the Democratic convention, winning 679 delegates to Hearst's 181. Meanwhile, 80-year-old former West Virginia U.S. Senator Henry Gassaway Davis was selected as Parker's running mate.

== Campaign ==
Parker and the Democrats campaigned in favor of reduced federal spending (especially on the military), greater funding to improve national waterways, tariff reform, a thorough investigation of public corruption, direct election of U.S. Senators, arbitration of labor disputes, an eight-hour workday for federal employees, and campaign finance reform. They also condemned Republican imperialism in foreign policy, President Roosevelt's unconstitutional "executive usurpation" of legislative and judicial powers, trade protectionism, and antitrust legislation. In addition, Parker and the Democrats endorsed construction of "the Panama Canal speedily, honestly, and economically." To mollify the Silverites in the Democratic Party, a plank endorsing the gold standard was omitted (though Parker personally ran in favor of the gold standard) and, in return, Bryan's plank for a progressive income tax was left out to placate conservatives.

Unlike Bryan, who had aggressively campaigned throughout the entire country during the 1896 and 1900 campaigns, Parker ran a front porch campaign from his home in Esopus, New York. Parker received a boost when Bryan endorsed Parker after the convention and belatedly campaigned for him in October. Meanwhile, Hill, who managed Parker's campaign, sure of a landslide defeat in November, announced his retirement from politics in order to save Parker from guilt by association with Hill. Throughout the 1904 campaign, the Democrats raised less than $500,000 (equivalent to $17.5 million in 2024), with more than half of it coming from Virginia tobacco magnate Thomas Fortune Ryan. In the final weeks of the campaign, Parker tried to save his campaign by undertaking a brief speaking tour at the insistence of desperate party leaders, but it was to no avail.

== Results ==
President Roosevelt defeated Parker by a landslide, beating him 336 to 140 in the Electoral College and 56% to 38% in the national popular vote. It was the largest popular margin of victory in American history until the 1920 presidential election. Parker won only the 11 states of the former Confederacy and two border states, Kentucky and Maryland (with the latter by just 53 votes). Meanwhile, Roosevelt carried three border states (Delaware, Missouri, and West Virginia) and the nation's 29 other states.

In addition, Roosevelt's coattails allowed the Republican Party to win a majority of over 100 seats in the U.S. House of Representatives for the first time ever.
