= 1904 United States presidential election in New Jersey =

- November 8, 1904
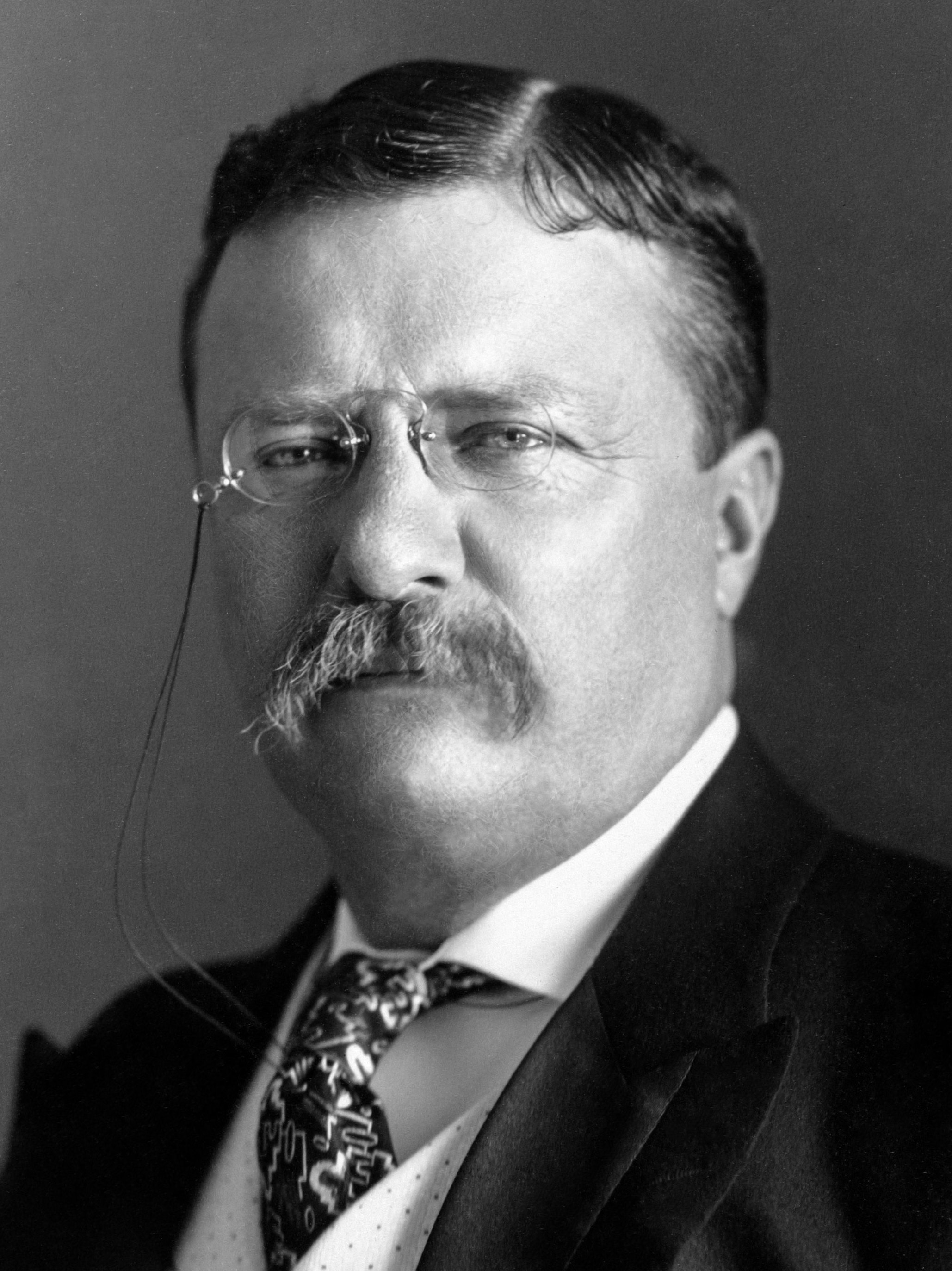

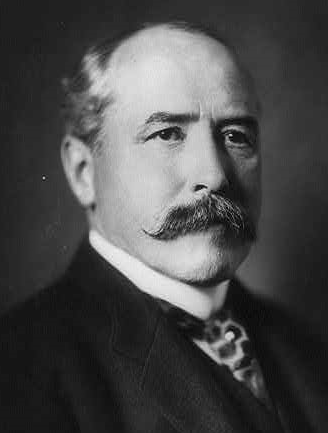
Nominee	Theodore Roosevelt	Alton B. Parker
Party	Republican	Democratic
Home state	New York	New York
Running mate	Charles W. Fairbanks	Henry G. Davis
Electoral vote	12	0
Popular vote	245,164	164,566
Percentage	56.68%	38.05%
County results
Roosevelt
50–60%
60–70%
70–80%
Parker
40–50%
50–60%
President before election
Theodore Roosevelt
Republican
Elected President
Theodore Roosevelt
Republican

The 1904 United States presidential election in New Jersey took place on November 8, 1904. All contemporary 45 states were part of the 1904 United States presidential election. State voters chose 12 electors to the Electoral College, which selected the president and vice president.

New Jersey was won by the Republican nominees, incumbent President Theodore Roosevelt of New York and his running mate incumbent Vice President Charles W. Fairbanks of Indiana. Roosevelt and Fairbanks defeated the Democratic nominees, Chief Judge of the New York Court of Appeals Alton B. Parker of New York and his running mate Senator Henry G. Davis of West Virginia Also in the running was the Socialist Party candidate, Eugene V. Debs, who ran with Ben Hanford.

Roosevelt carried New Jersey with 56.68% of the vote to Parker's 38.05%, a victory margin of 18.63%.

Eugene Debs came in a distant third, with 2.22%.

Like much of the Northeast, New Jersey in the early decades of the 20th century was a staunchly Republican state, having not given a majority of the vote to a Democratic presidential candidate since 1892. While winning a landslide victory nationwide, Roosevelt easily held New Jersey in the Republican column in 1904.

On the county level map, Roosevelt carried 17 of the state's 21 counties, breaking 60% of the vote in 7 counties. Parker's most significant win was urban Hudson County, which he won along with the 3 rural counties in western North Jersey, Warren, Sussex, and Hunterdon, which had long been non-Yankee Democratic enclaves in the otherwise Republican Northeast.

Amidst Roosevelt's nationwide landslide, New Jersey's election result in 1904 made the state less than 1% more Democratic than the national average. Roosevelt's victory in New Jersey was underwhelming in part because of Alton Parker's popularity in the New York City area, his victory in New York City spilling over to allow him to win heavily populated urban Hudson County, New Jersey just across the Hudson River, which is part of the New York City metro area.

== Results ==
1904 United States presidential election in New Jersey
Party	Candidate	Votes	Percentage	Electoral votes
Republican	Theodore Roosevelt (incumbent)	245,164	56.68%	12
Democratic	Alton B. Parker	164,566	38.05%	0
Socialist	Eugene V. Debs	9,587	2.22%	0
Prohibition	Silas C. Swallow	6,845	1.58%	0
People's	Thomas E. Watson	3,705	0.86%	0
Socialist Labor	Charles Hunter Corregan	2,680	0.62%	0
Totals		432,547	100.0%	12

=== Results by county ===
County	Theodore Roosevelt Republican		Alton B. Parker Democratic		Eugene V. Debs Socialist		Silas C. Swallow Prohibition		Thomas E. Watson Populist		Charles Corregan Socialist Labor		Margin		Total votes cast
County	#	%	#	%	#	%	#	%	#	%	#	%	#	%	Total votes cast
Atlantic	7,933	70.53%	3,064	27.24%	37	0.33%	183	1.63%	30	0.27%	18	0.16%	4,869	43.29%	11,247
Bergen	9,957	55.00%	7,301	40.33%	461	2.55%	194	1.07%	190	1.05%	115	0.64%	2,656	14.67%	18,103
Burlington	8,655	60.05%	4,962	34.43%	128	0.89%	538	3.73%	129	0.90%	35	0.24%	3,693	25.62%	14,412
Camden	18,225	63.47%	9,423	32.82%	384	1.34%	569	1.98%	114	0.40%	45	0.16%	8,802	30.65%	28,715
Cape May	2,832	66.60%	1,238	29.12%	49	1.15%	122	2.87%	11	0.26%	3	0.07%	1,594	37.49%	4,252
Cumberland	7,402	64.45%	3,317	28.88%	162	1.41%	548	4.77%	56	0.49%	30	0.26%	4,085	35.57%	11,485
Essex	50,508	63.24%	25,452	31.87%	2,479	3.10%	582	0.73%	842	1.05%	647	0.81%	25,056	31.37%	79,863
Gloucester	4,829	59.24%	2,818	34.57%	48	0.59%	399	4.89%	58	0.71%	13	0.16%	2,011	24.67%	8,152
Hudson	36,683	46.66%	38,021	48.36%	2,860	3.64%	372	0.47%	677	0.86%	396	0.50%	-1,338	-1.70%	78,613
Hunterdon	3,856	44.60%	4,361	50.44%	22	0.25%	291	3.37%	116	1.34%	10	0.12%	-505	-5.84%	8,646
Mercer	14,900	60.90%	8,527	34.85%	586	2.40%	335	1.37%	119	0.49%	118	0.48%	6,373	26.05%	24,467
Middlesex	10,117	57.44%	6,996	39.72%	113	0.64%	214	1.22%	173	0.98%	69	0.39%	3,121	17.72%	17,613
Monmouth	10,885	53.01%	9,032	43.99%	93	0.45%	415	2.02%	109	0.53%	45	0.22%	1,853	9.02%	20,534
Morris	8,201	58.15%	4,768	33.81%	373	2.65%	514	3.64%	246	1.74%	104	0.74%	3,433	24.34%	14,102
Ocean	3,666	66.02%	1,709	30.78%	23	0.41%	140	2.52%	15	0.27%	7	0.13%	1,957	35.24%	5,553
Passaic	17,705	57.21%	11,532	37.26%	1,017	3.29%	261	0.84%	433	1.40%	439	1.42%	6,173	19.95%	30,948
Salem	3,694	54.73%	2,775	41.11%	18	0.27%	228	3.38%	35	0.52%	5	0.07%	919	13.61%	6,750
Somerset	4,633	57.70%	3,195	39.79%	21	0.26%	136	1.69%	44	0.55%	18	0.22%	1,438	17.91%	8,029
Sussex	2,642	43.61%	3,133	51.72%	56	0.92%	141	2.33%	86	1.42%	8	0.13%	-491	-8.10%	6,058
Union	13,906	59.44%	8,574	36.65%	535	2.29%	261	1.12%	120	0.51%	204	0.87%	5,332	22.79%	23,396
Warren	3,935	44.07%	4,368	48.92%	122	1.37%	402	4.50%	102	1.14%	51	0.57%	-433	-4.85%	8,929
Totals	245,164	56.72%	164,566	38.07%	9,587	2.22%	6,845	1.58%	3,705	0.86%	2,380	0.55%	80,598	18.65%	432,247

== See also ==
- Presidency of Theodore Roosevelt
- United States presidential elections in New Jersey
