= 1904 United States presidential election =

Election of Theodore Roosevelt

- November 8, 1904

476 members of the Electoral College 239 electoral votes needed to win
- Turnout: 65.5% (▼8.2 pp)
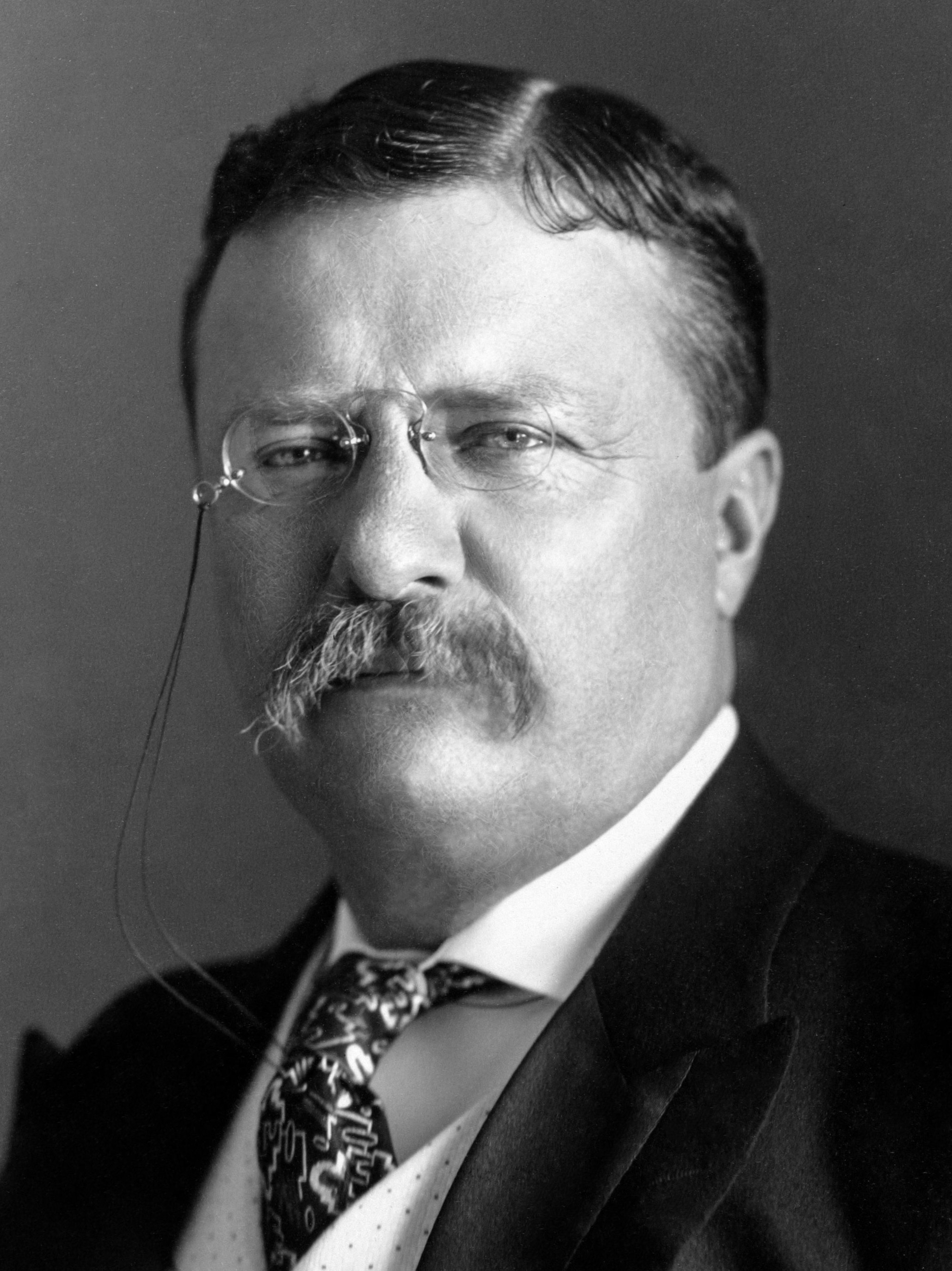

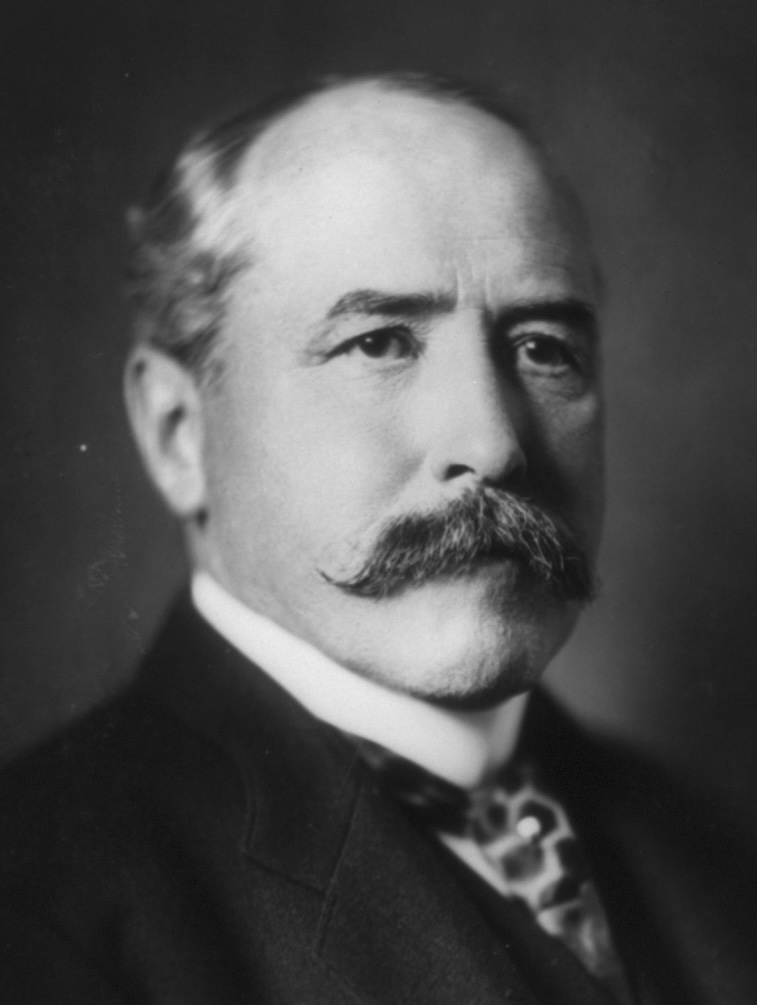
Nominee	Theodore Roosevelt	Alton B. Parker
Party	Republican	Democratic
Home state	New York	New York
Running mate	Charles W. Fairbanks	Henry G. Davis
Electoral vote	336	140
States carried	32	13
Popular vote	7,630,457	5,083,880
Percentage	56.4%	37.6%
- Presidential election results map. Red denotes states won by Roosevelt/Fairbanks, blue denotes those won by Parker/Davis. Numbers indicate the number of electoral votes allotted to each state.
President before election
Theodore Roosevelt
Republican
Elected President
Theodore Roosevelt
Republican

A presidential election was held in the United States on November 8, 1904. Incumbent Republican president Theodore Roosevelt defeated the conservative Democratic nominee, Alton B. Parker. Roosevelt's victory made him the first president who ascended to the presidency upon the death of his predecessor to win a full term in his own right.

Roosevelt took office in September 1901 following the assassination of his predecessor, William McKinley. After the February 1904 death of McKinley's ally, Senator Mark Hanna, Roosevelt faced little opposition at the 1904 Republican National Convention. The conservative Bourbon Democrat allies of former president Grover Cleveland temporarily regained control of the Democratic Party from the followers of William Jennings Bryan, and the 1904 Democratic National Convention nominated Alton B. Parker, Chief Judge of the New York Court of Appeals. Parker triumphed on the first ballot of the convention, defeating newspaper magnate William Randolph Hearst.

As there was little difference between the candidates' positions, the race was largely based on their personalities; the Democrats argued that the Roosevelt presidency was "arbitrary" and "erratic". Republicans emphasized Roosevelt's success in foreign affairs and his record of firmness against monopolies. Roosevelt easily defeated Parker, sweeping every US region except the South, while Parker lost multiple states won by Bryan in 1900, as well as his home state of New York. Roosevelt's popular vote margin of 18.8% was the largest in the century between 1820 and 1920. With Roosevelt's landslide, he became the first presidential candidate to receive over 300 electoral votes, as well as the first non-midwestern Republican to be elected president. This was the first time since 1868 that Missouri voted for the Republican candidate. This was also the second presidential election in which both major party candidates were registered in the same home state; the others have been in 1860, 1920, 1940, 1944, and 2016.

== Nominations ==
=== Republican Party nomination ===
Republican Party (United States) 1904 Republican Party ticket
Theodore Roosevelt	Charles W. Fairbanks
for President	for Vice President
26th President of the United States (1901–1909)	U.S. Senator from Indiana (1897–1905)

Republican candidates:

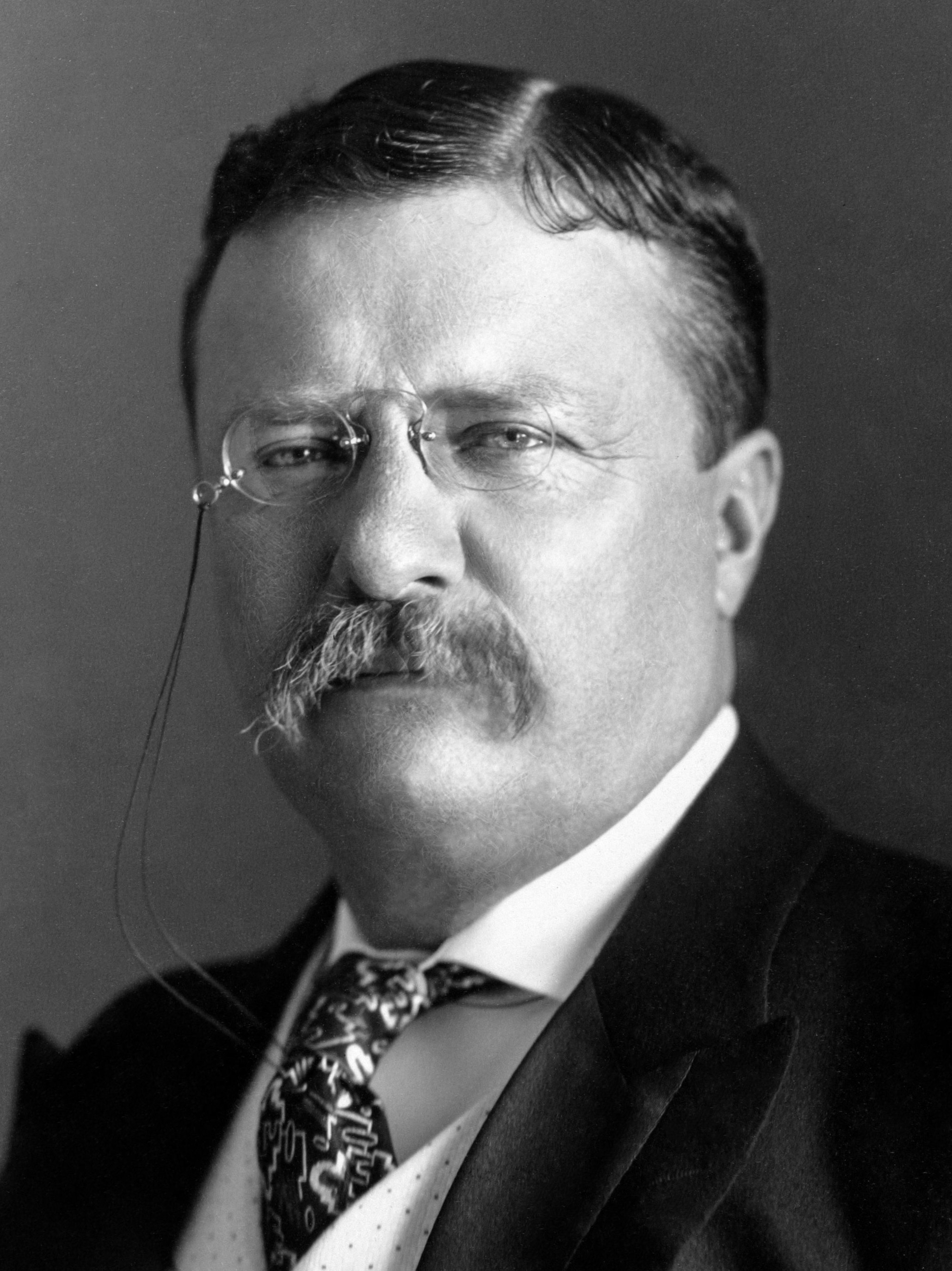
President
Theodore Roosevelt

Senator
Mark Hanna
from Ohio
(died February 15, 1904)

As Republicans convened in Chicago on June 21–23, 1904, President Theodore Roosevelt's nomination was assured. He had effectively maneuvered throughout 1902 and 1903 to gain control of the party to ensure it. A dump-Roosevelt movement had centered on the candidacy of conservative Senator Mark Hanna from Ohio, but Hanna's death in February 1904 had removed this obstacle. Roosevelt's nomination speech was delivered by former governor Frank S. Black of New York and seconded by Senator Albert J. Beveridge from Indiana. Roosevelt was nominated unanimously on the first ballot with 994 votes.

Since conservatives in the Republican Party denounced Theodore Roosevelt as a radical, they were allowed to choose the vice-presidential candidate. Senator Charles W. Fairbanks from Indiana was the obvious choice, since conservatives thought highly of him, yet he managed not to offend the party's more progressive elements. Roosevelt was personally disappointed with the idea of Fairbanks for vice-president. He would have preferred Representative Robert R. Hitt from Illinois, but he did not consider the vice-presidential nomination worth a fight. With solid support from New York, Pennsylvania, and Indiana, Fairbanks was easily placed on the 1904 Republican ticket to appease the Old Guard.

The Republican platform insisted on maintenance of the protective tariff, called for increased foreign trade, pledged to uphold the gold standard, favored expansion of the merchant marine, promoted a strong navy, and praised in detail Roosevelt's foreign and domestic policy.

Presidential ballot
Ballot	1st
Theodore Roosevelt	994

Vice-presidential ballot
Ballot	1st
Charles W. Fairbanks	994

=== Democratic Party nomination ===
Democratic Party (United States) 1904 Democratic Party ticket
Alton B. Parker	Henry G. Davis
for President	for Vice President
Chief Judge of the New York Court of Appeals (1898–1904)	U.S. Senator from West Virginia (1871–1883)
Campaign

Democratic candidates:

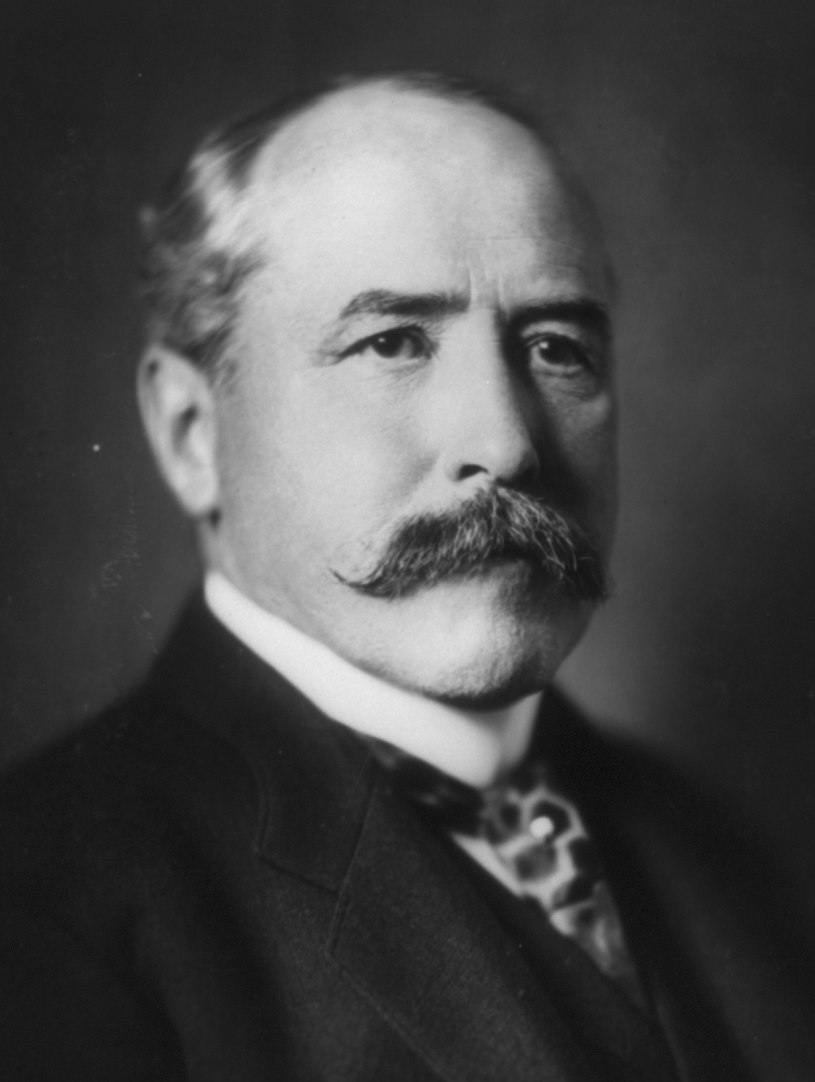
Chief Judge
Alton B. Parker
from New York

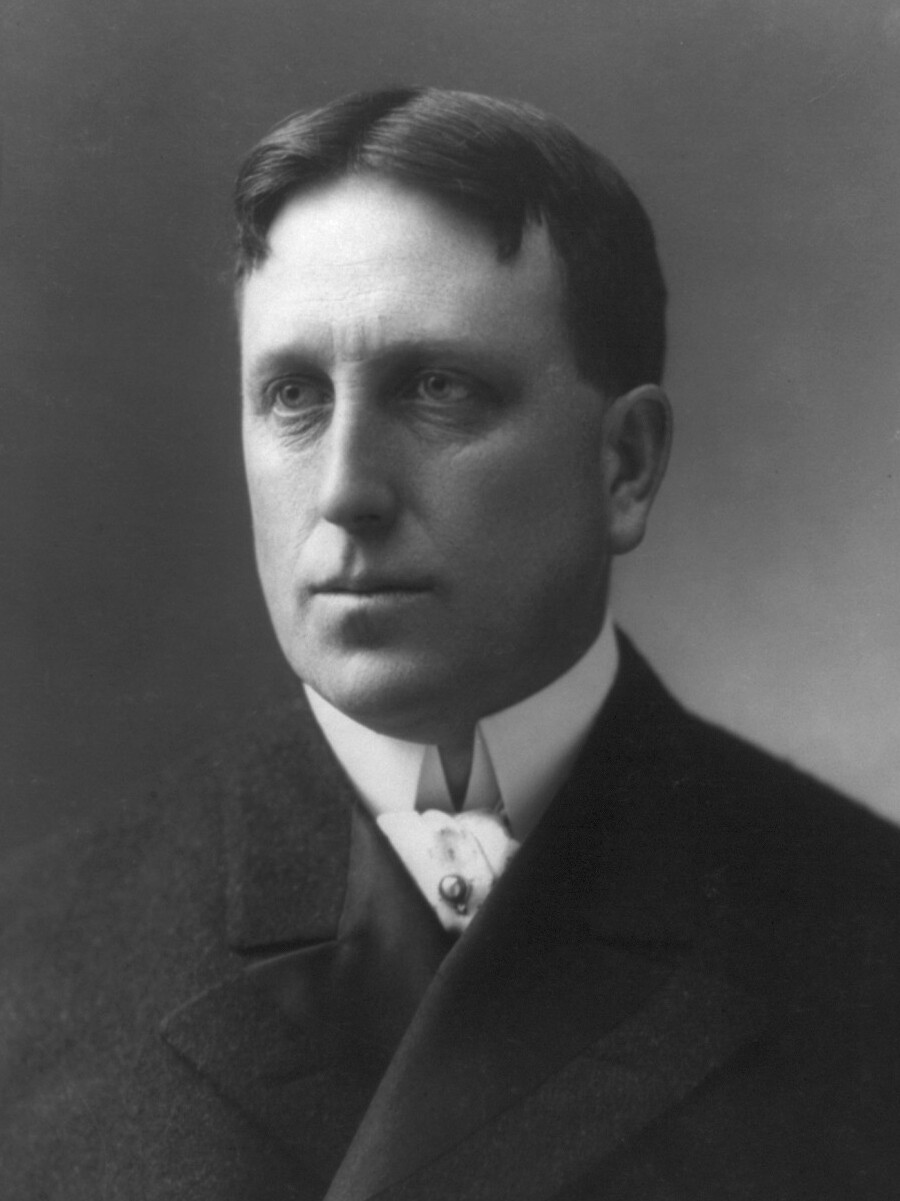
Representative
William Randolph Hearst
from New York

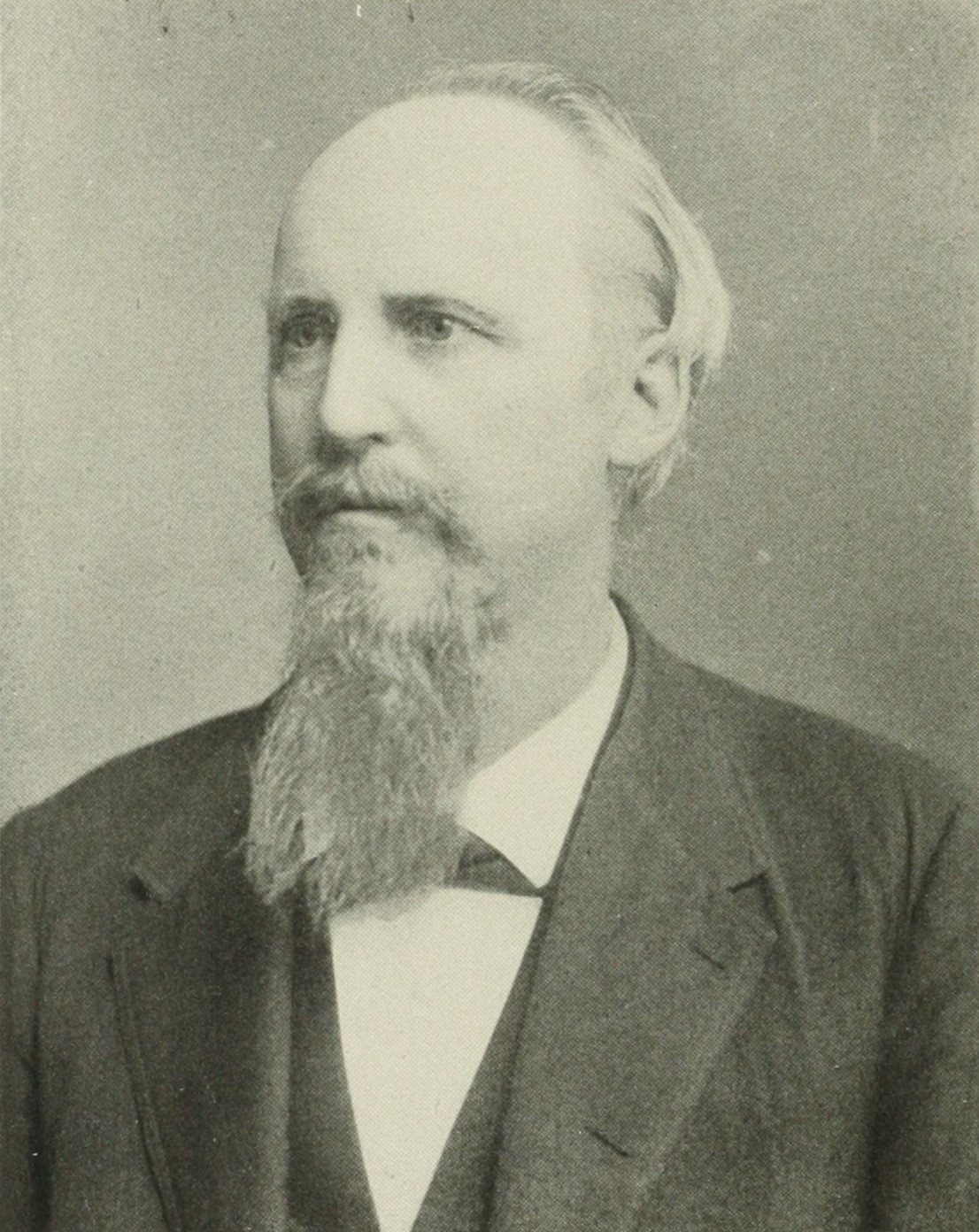
Senator
Francis Cockrell
from Missouri

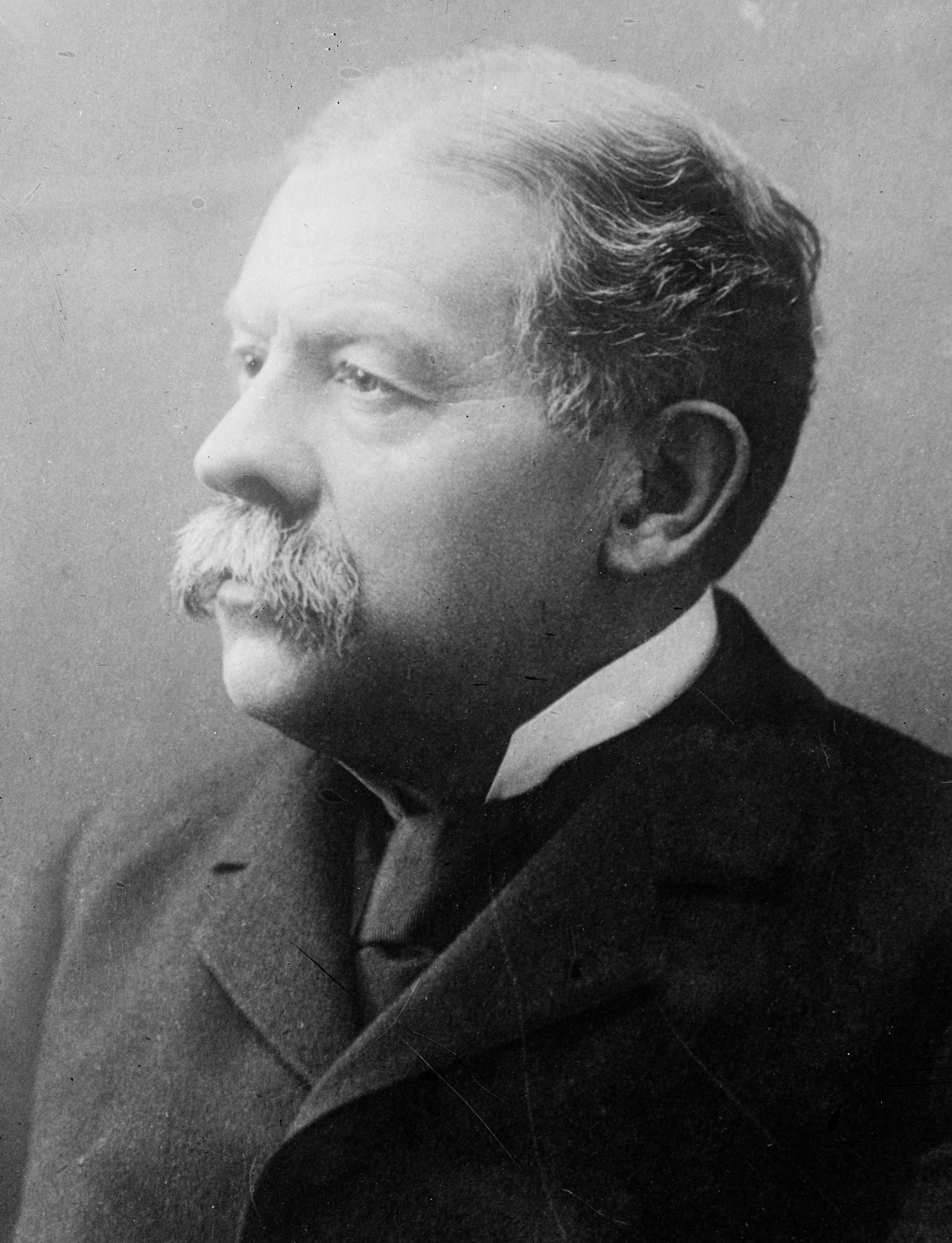
Richard Olney
Former U.S. Secretary of State from Massachusetts

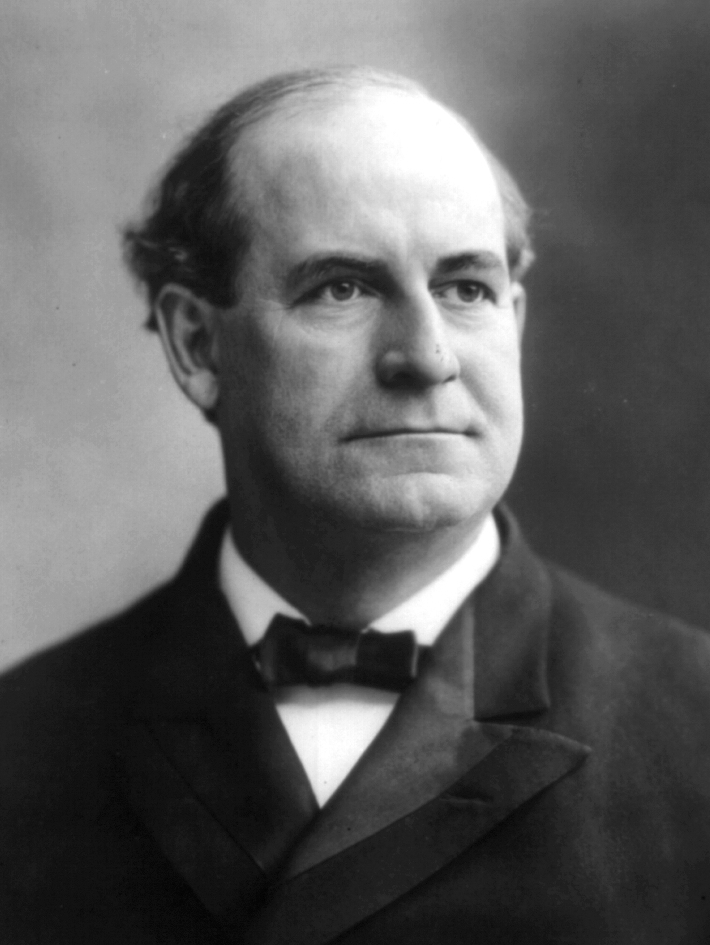
William Jennings Bryan
from Nebraska
(declined on Jan 10)

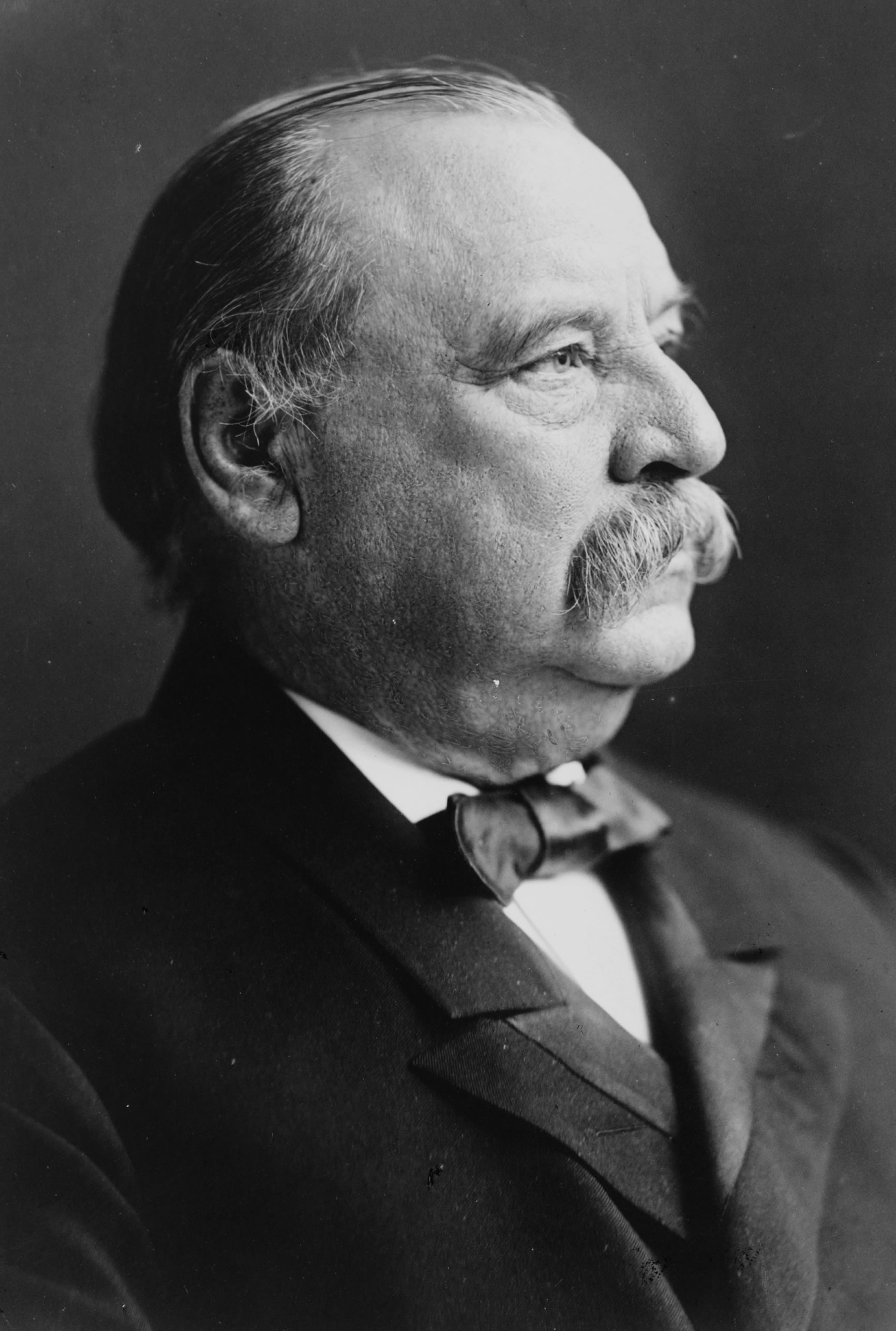
Former President
Grover Cleveland
from New Jersey
(declined)

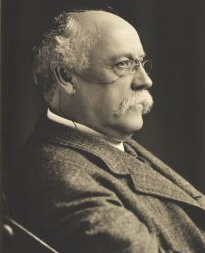
Edward C. Wall
from Wisconsin

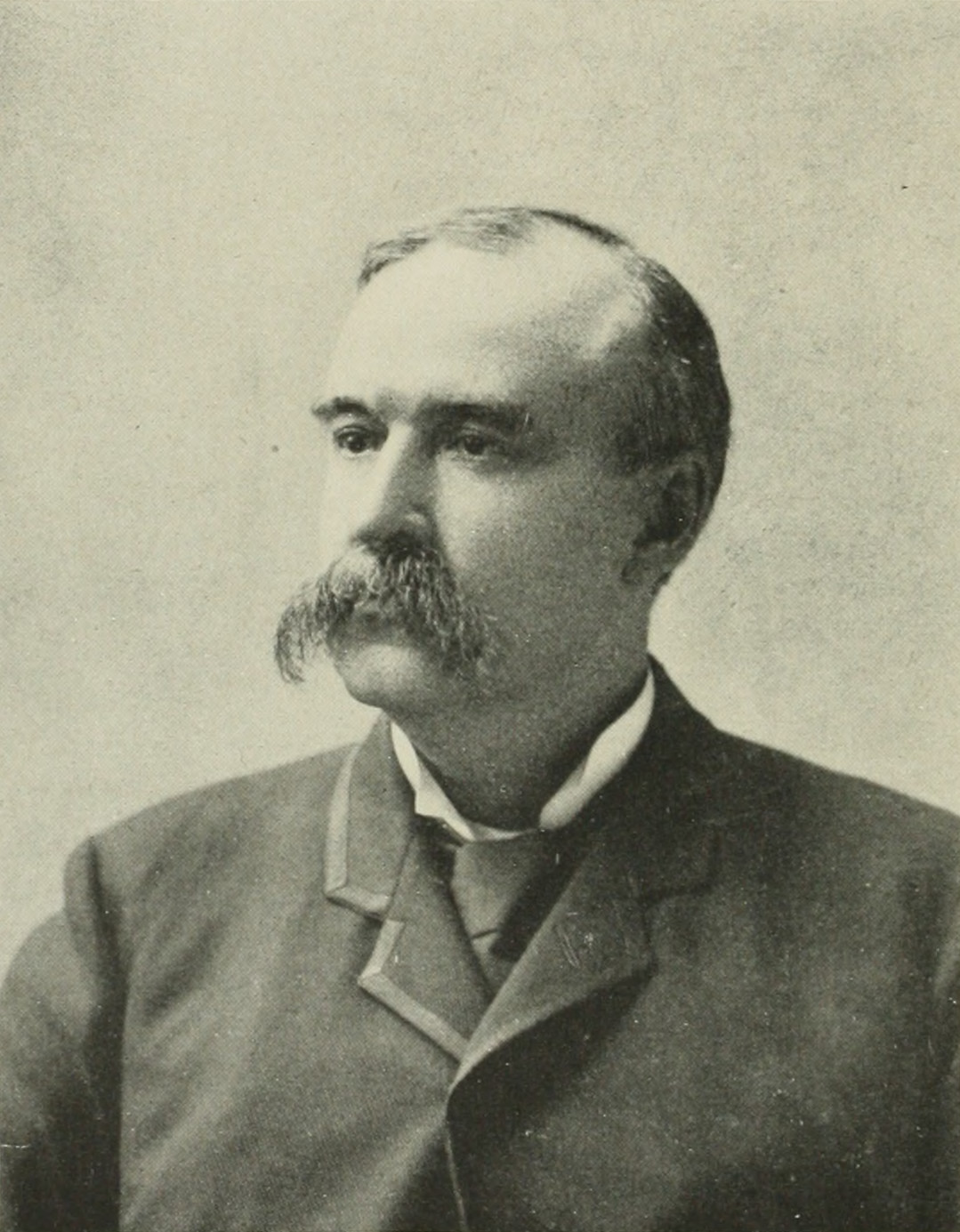
George Gray
from Delaware

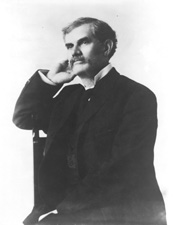
Representative
John Sharp Williams
from Mississippi
(declined)

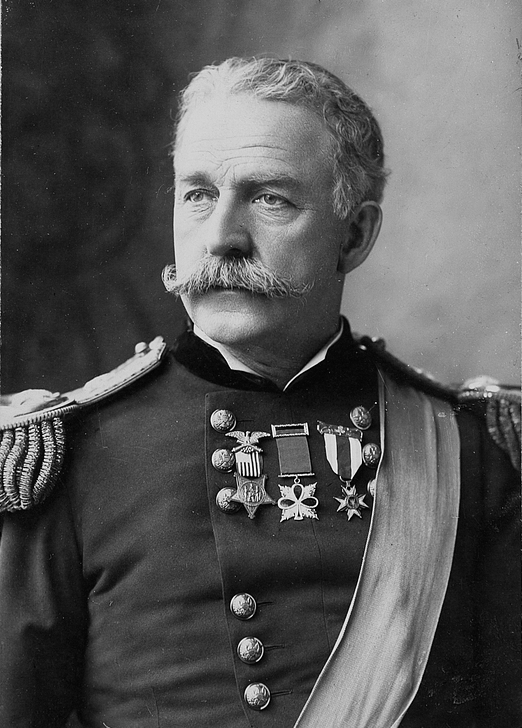
Lieutenant General
Nelson A. Miles
from Massachusetts

In 1904, both William Jennings Bryan and former President Grover Cleveland declined to run for president. Since the two Democratic nominees from the previous five elections did not seek the presidential nomination, Alton B. Parker, a Bourbon Democrat from New York, emerged as the frontrunner.

Parker, the Chief Judge of the New York Court of Appeals, was respected by both Democrats and Republicans in his state. On several occasions, the Republicans paid Parker the honor of running no one against him when he ran for various political positions. Parker refused to work actively for the nomination, but did nothing to restrain his conservative supporters, among them the sachems of Tammany Hall. Former President Grover Cleveland endorsed Parker.

The delegates from Florida were selected through a primary, which was the first time a primary was utilized to select the delegates for a presidential convention.

The Democratic Convention that met in St. Louis on July 6–9, 1904, has been called "one of the most exciting and sensational in the history of the Democratic Party". The struggle inside the Democratic Party over the nomination was to prove as contentious as the election itself. Though Parker, out of active politics for twenty years, had neither enemies nor errors to make him unavailable, the more liberal wing of the party waged a bitter battle against his candidacy in the months before the convention.

Despite Parker's support for the regular Democratic ticket under Bryan in 1896 and 1900, Bryan hated him for being a Gold Democrat. Bryan wanted the weakest man nominated—one who could not take control of the party away from him. He denounced Judge Parker as a tool of Wall Street before he was nominated, and declared that no self-respecting Democrat could vote for him.

Inheriting Bryan's support was publisher, now congressman, William Randolph Hearst of New York. Hearst owned eight newspapers, all of them friendly to labor, vigorous in their trust-busting activities, fighting the cause of "the people who worked for a living". Because of this liberalism, Hearst had the Illinois delegation pledged to him and the promise of several other states. Although Hearst's newspaper was the only major publication in the East to support William Jennings Bryan and Bimetallism in 1896, he found that his support for Bryan was not reciprocated. Instead, Bryan seconded the nomination of Francis Cockrell.

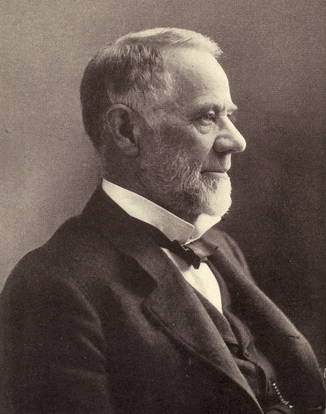
At 80, Davis is the oldest major party candidate ever nominated for national office.

The prospect of having Hearst for a candidate frightened conservative Democrats so much that they renewed their efforts to get Parker nominated on the first ballot. Parker received 658 votes on the first roll call, 9 short of the necessary two-thirds. Before the result could be announced, 21 more votes were transferred to Parker. As a result, Parker handily won the nomination on the first ballot with 679 votes to 181 for Hearst and the rest scattered.

After Parker's nomination, Bryan charged that it had been dictated by the trusts and secured by "crooked and indefensible methods." Bryan also said that labor had been betrayed in the convention and could look for nothing from the Democratic Party. Indeed, Parker was one of the judges on the New York Court of Appeals who declared the eight-hour law unconstitutional.

Before a vice-presidential candidate could be nominated, Parker sprang into action when he learned that the Democratic platform pointedly omitted reference to the monetary issue. To make his position clear, Parker, after his nomination, informed the convention by letter that he supported the gold standard. The letter read, "I regard the gold standard as firmly and irrevocably established and shall act accordingly if the action of the convention today shall be ratified by the people. As the platform is silent on the subject, my view should be made known to the convention, and if it is proved to be unsatisfactory to the majority, I request you to decline the nomination for me at once, so that another may be nominated before adjournment."

It was the first time a candidate had made such a move. It risked losing him the nomination and made him an outcast from the party he had served and believed in all his life.

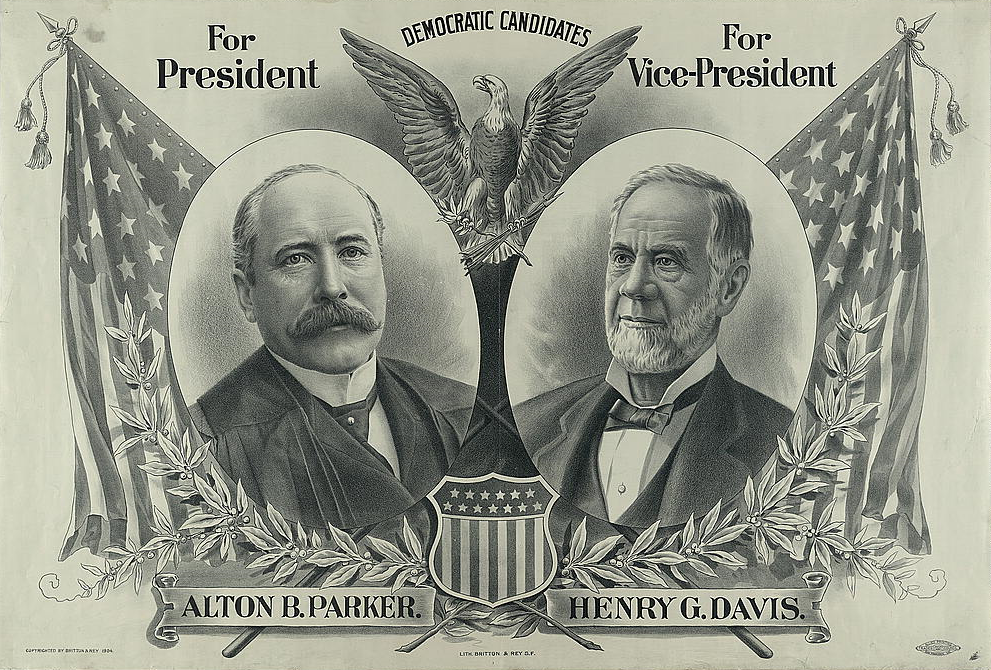
Parker/Davis campaign poster

Former Senator Henry G. Davis from West Virginia was nominated for vice president; at 80, he was the oldest major party candidate ever nominated for national office. Davis received the nomination because party leaders believed that as a millionaire mine owner, railroad magnate, and banker, he could be counted on to help finance the campaign. Their hopes were unrealized, as Davis did not substantially contribute to the party coffers.

Parker protested against "the rule of individual caprice", the presidential "usurpation of authority", and the "aggrandizement of personal power". However, his more positive proposals were so backward-looking, such as his proposal to let state legislatures and the common law develop a remedy for the trust problem, that the New York World characterized the campaign as a struggle of "conservative and constitutional Democracy against radical and arbitrary Republicanism".

The Democratic platform called for reduction in government expenditures and a congressional investigation of the executive departments "already known to teem with corruption". It condemned monopolies; pledged an end to government contracts with companies violating antitrust laws; opposed imperialism; insisted upon independence for the Philippines; and opposed the protective tariff. It favored strict enforcement of the eight-hour day in labor; construction of a Panama Canal; the direct election of senators; statehood for the Western territories; the eradication of polygamy; reciprocal trade agreements; cuts in the army; and enforcement of the civil service laws. It condemned the Roosevelt administration in general as "spasmodic, erratic, sensational, spectacular, and arbitrary".

The balloting
Presidential ballot	1st (before shifts)	1st (after shifts)	Unanimous	Vice-presidential ballot	1st	Unanimous
Alton B. Parker	658	679	1,000	Henry G. Davis	654	1,000
William Randolph Hearst	200	181		James R. Williams	165	
Francis Cockrell	42	42		George Turner	100	
Richard Olney	38	38		William Alexander Harris	58	
Edward C. Wall	27	27		Abstaining	23	
George Gray	12	12				
John Sharp Williams	8	8				
Robert E. Pattison	4	4				
George B. McClellan Jr.	3	3				
Nelson A. Miles	3	3				
Charles A. Towne	2	2				
Arthur Pue Gorman	2	-				
Bird Sim Coler	1	1				

=== Socialist Party nomination ===
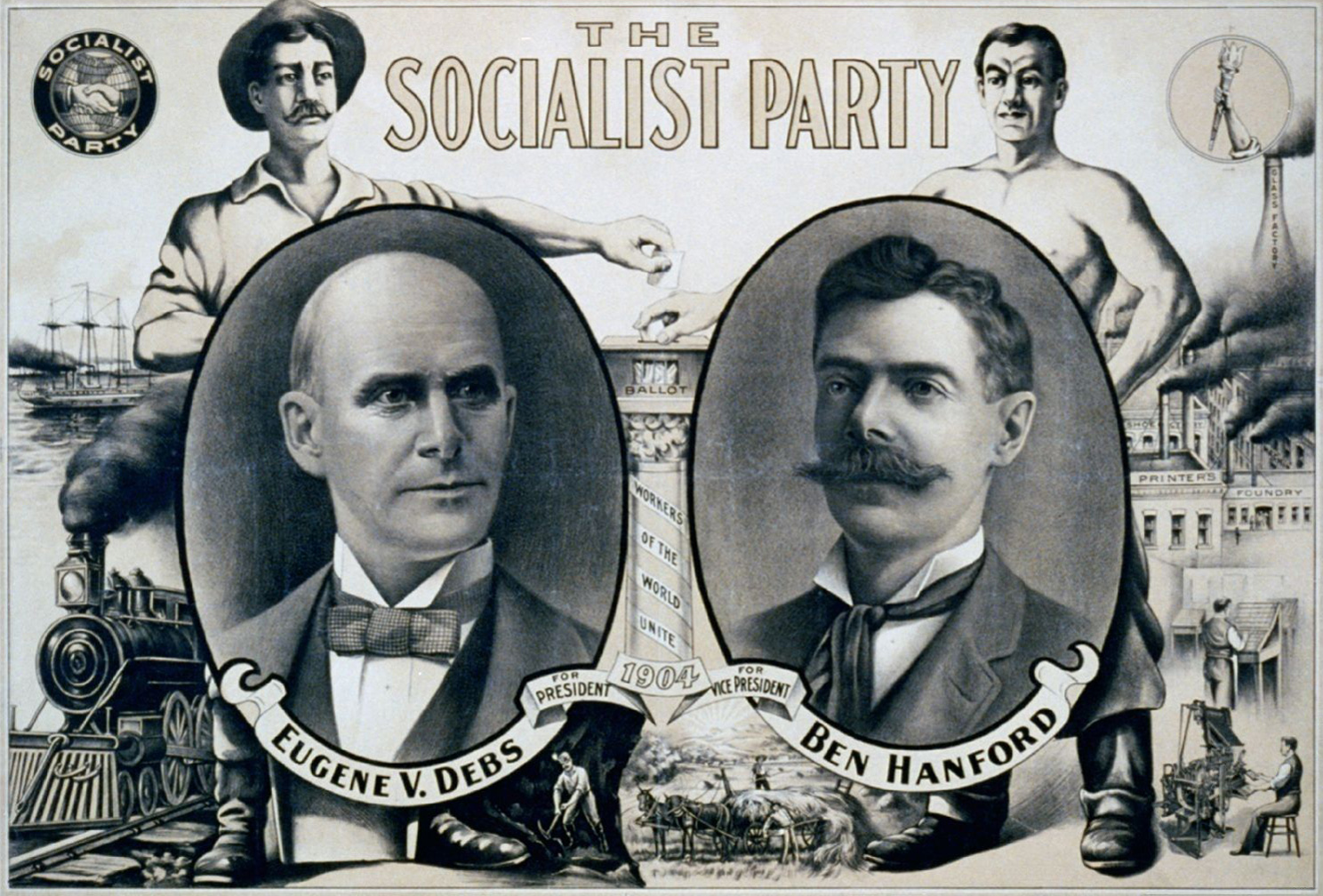
Debs/Hanford campaign poster

The Socialist Party of America was formed from the Social Democratic Party of America and the Kangaroo faction of the Socialist Labor Party of America at a 1901 convention in Indianapolis. The Socialists received over 227,000 votes in the 1902 United States House of Representatives elections, which was twice the number of votes that Eugene V. Debs had received in 1900. Nine Socialists were elected to the city council in Milwaukee, Wisconsin, in the 1904 election.

On May 5, 1904, George D. Herron nominated Debs for the presidential nomination while Hermon F. Titus nominated Ben Hanford for the vice-presidential nomination. The 183 delegates who attended the convention voted unanimously to give the presidential and vice-presidential nominations to Debs and Hanford. Debs accepted the nomination on May 6, and chair Seymour Stedman referred to Debs as the "Ferdinand Lassalle of the twentieth century".

The Socialists raised $32,700 during the campaign. Debs received 402,810 votes, which was over four times the number that he had received in 1900, and he received his largest amount of support from Illinois. Debs received more votes than Parker in counties such as Rock Island in Illinois and Skamania in Washington, and outpolled Roosevelt in some Southern counties.

=== Minor party nominations ===
==== Continental Party ====
The Continental Party met in Chicago on August 31, 1904. They nominated Austin Holcomb as their presidential candidate. Initially, George H. Shibley was nominated for vice-president. He turned down the nomination, however, and A. King Percy was nominated in his stead.

==== Populist Party ====
The Populist Party held their national convention in Springfield, Illinois from July 4 to 6, 1904. Unsatisfied with the Democratic Party's nomination of Alton Parker for president they chose to nominate their own candidates to contest the office, unlike in 1896 and 1900, when they endorsed Bryan. After two ballots, Thomas Watson was selected as the party's presidential candidate and Thomas Tibbles was selected as his running mate.

Presidential ballot	1st	2nd	Vice-presidential ballot	1st
Thomas E. Watson	334	698	Thomas H. Tibbles	698
William V. Allen	319	0		
Samuel W. Williams	45	0		

==== Prohibition Party ====
The Prohibition Party met in Indianapolis from June 29 to July 1. The convention was attended by 758 delegates representing 39 states. Silas C. Swallow was selected as the party's presidential candidate and George W. Carrol was selected as the vice-presidential candidate.

==== Socialist Labor Party ====
The Socialist Labor Party met at the Grand Central Palace in New York City from July 2 to July 8. Their convention was attended by 38 delegates representing 18 states. Those delegates nominated Charles H. Corregan and William W. Cox for president and vice-president respectively.

==== National Liberty Party ====
The National Liberty Party met in St. Louis from July 5 to 6 to nominate a presidential slate. While 28 delegates attended the convention and elected to nominate Stanley P. Mitchell and William C. Payne as their candidates, the party ultimately did not contest the election after Mitchell declined the nomination.

== General election ==
=== Campaign ===
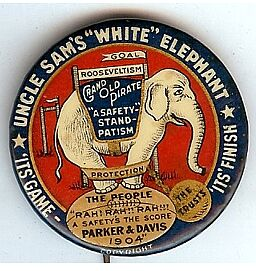
Parker campaign button

The major parties campaigned much less vigorously than they had in 1896 and 1900. The campaign season was pervaded by goodwill, and it went a long way toward mending the damage done by the previous class-war elections. This was due to the fact that Parker and Roosevelt, with the exception of charisma, were so similar in political outlook.

So close were the two candidates that few differences could be detected. Both men were for the gold standard; though the Democrats were more outspokenly against imperialism, both believed in fair treatment for the Filipinos and eventual liberation; and both believed that labor unions had the same rights as individuals before the courts. The radicals in the Democratic Party denounced Parker as a conservative; the conservatives in the Republican Party denounced Theodore Roosevelt as a radical.

Theodore Roosevelt, Joseph Cannon, members of the Republican Nomination Committee, and guests in front of Sagamore Hill, Oyster Bay, N.Y. (1904)

During the campaign, there were a couple of instances in which Roosevelt was seen as vulnerable. In the first place, Joseph Pulitzer's New York World carried a full-page story about alleged corruption in the Bureau of Corporations. President Roosevelt admitted certain payments had been made, but denied any "blackmail." Secondly, in appointing George B. Cortelyou as his campaign manager, Roosevelt had purposely used his former Secretary of Commerce and Labor. This was of importance because Cortelyou, knowing the secrets of the corporations, could extract large contributions from them. The charge created quite a stir and in later years was proven to be sound. In 1907, it was disclosed that the insurance companies had contributed rather too heavily to the Roosevelt campaign. Only a week before the election, Roosevelt himself called E. H. Harriman, the railroad king, to Washington, D.C., for the purpose of raising funds to carry New York.

Both candidates received insiders' money, however. Parker received financial support from the Morgan banking interests, just as Bourbon Democrat Cleveland had before him. Thomas W. Lawson, the Boston millionaire, charged that New York state Senator Patrick Henry McCarren, a prominent Parker backer, was on the payroll of Standard Oil at the rate of twenty thousand dollars a year. Lawson offered Senator McCarren $100,000 (equivalent to $3.6 million today) if he would disprove the charge. According to one account, "No denial of the charge was ever made by the Senator." One paper even referred to McCarren as "the Standard Oil serpent of Brooklyn politics."

=== Results ===
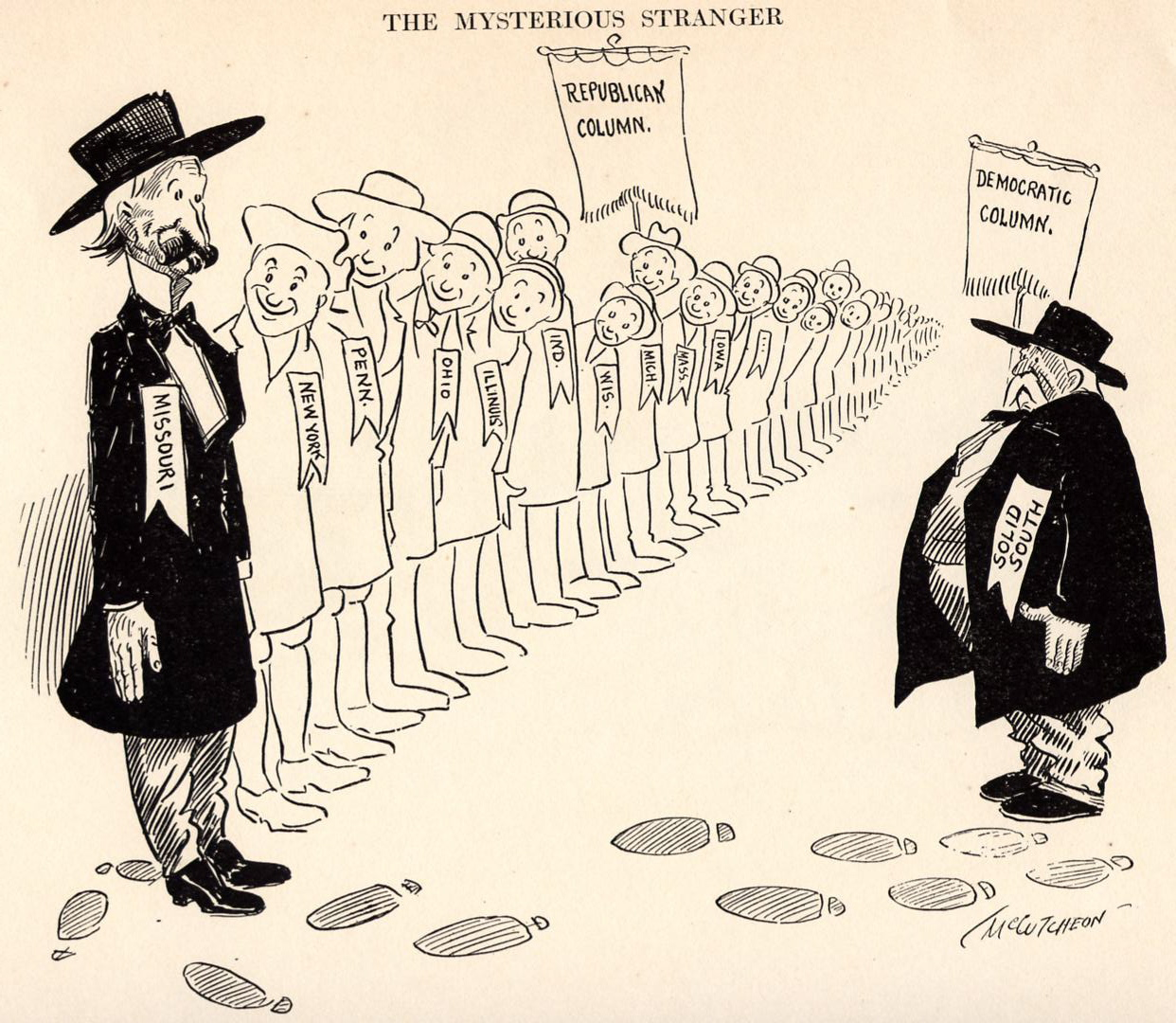
"The Mysterious Stranger" – A political cartoon showing Missouri having left the Solid South by voting Republican.

In the election, 29.7% of the voting age population and 65.5% of eligible voters participated. Theodore Roosevelt won a landslide victory, taking every Northern and Western state.

Roosevelt was the first Republican to carry the state of Missouri since Ulysses S. Grant in 1868. In voting Republican, Missouri repositioned itself from being associated with the Solid South to being seen as a bellwether swing state throughout the 20th century. The vote in Maryland was extremely close. For the first time in that state's history, secret paper ballots, supplied at public expense, and without political symbols of any kind, were issued to each voter. Candidates for electors were listed under the presidential and vice presidential candidates for each party; there were four parties recognized in the election: Democratic, Republican, Prohibition, and Socialist. Voters were free to mark their ballots for up to eight candidates of any party. While Roosevelt's victory nationally was quickly determined, the election in Maryland remained in doubt for several weeks. On November 30, Roosevelt was declared the statewide victor by just 51 votes. However, as voters had voted for individual presidential electors, only one Republican elector, Charles Bonaparte, survived the tally. The other seven top vote recipients were Democrats.

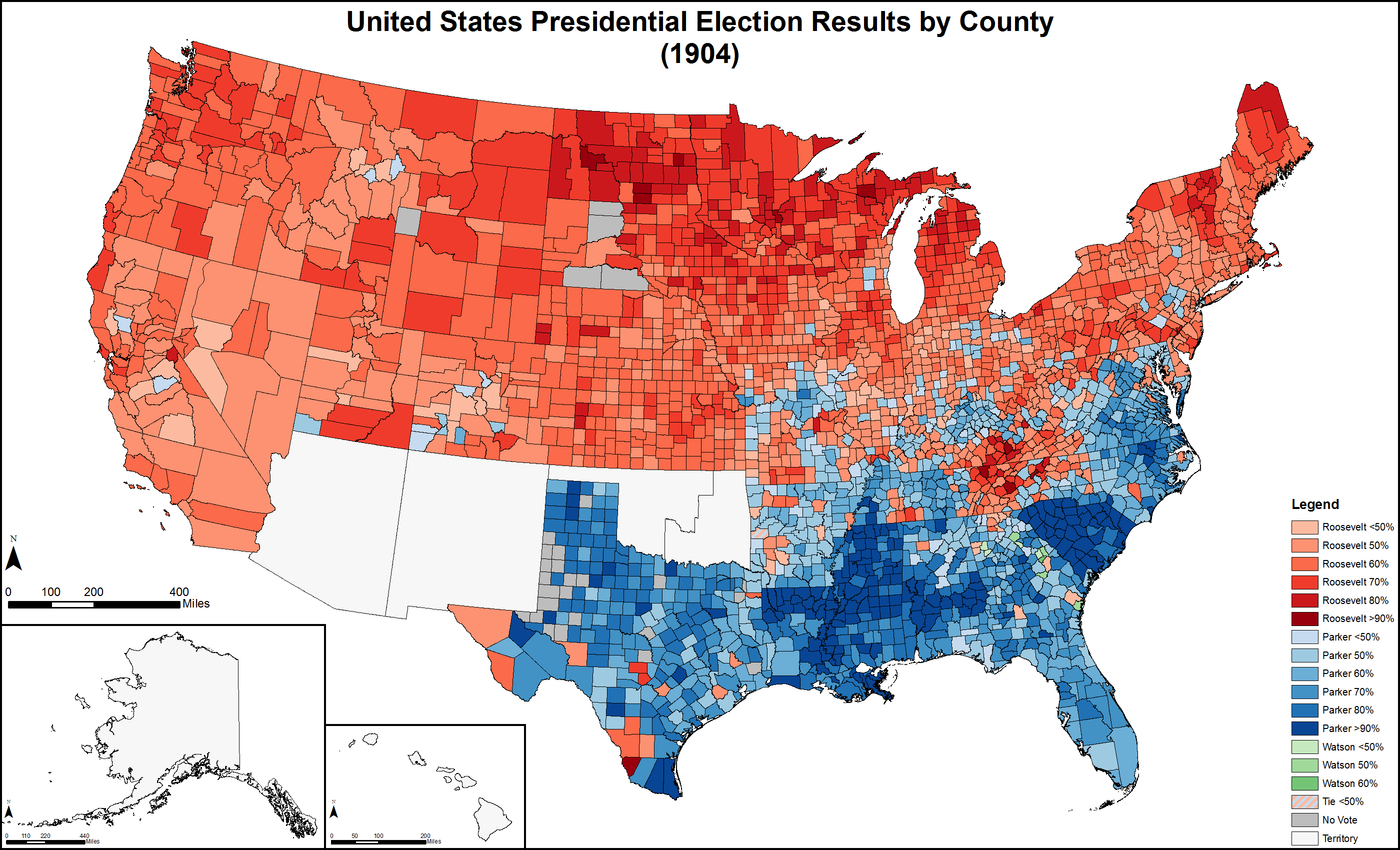
Results by county explicitly indicating the percentage for the winning candidate. Shades of red are for Roosevelt (Republican), shades of blue are for Parker (Democratic), and shades of green are for Watson (Populist).

Roosevelt won the election by more than 2.5 million popular votes, making him the first president to win a primarily two-man race by more than a million votes. Roosevelt won 56.4% of the popular vote; that, along with his popular vote margin of 18.8%, was the largest recorded between James Monroe's uncontested re-election in 1820 and the election of Warren G. Harding in 1920. Of the 2,754 counties making returns, Roosevelt carried 1,611 (58.50%) and won a majority of votes in 1,538; he and Parker were tied in one county (0.04%).

Populist candidate Thomas Watson received 117,183 votes and won nine counties (0.33%) in his home state of Georgia. He had a majority in five of the counties, and his vote total was double the Populist showing in 1900 but less than one eighth of the party's total in 1892.

Parker carried 1,133 counties (41.14%) and won a majority in 1,057. The distribution of the vote by counties reveals him to have been a weaker candidate than William Jennings Bryan, the party's nominee four years earlier, in every section of the nation, except for the deep South, where Democratic dominance remained strong, due in large part to pervasive disfranchisement of blacks. In 17 states, the Parker–Davis ticket failed to carry a single county, and outside the South carried only 84.

This was the last election in which the Republicans won Colorado, Nebraska, and Nevada until 1920.

Roosevelt won 5.24% of his votes from the eleven states of the former Confederacy and he won 29% of the vote in that region.

Electoral results
Presidential candidate	Party	Home state	Popular vote		Electoral vote	Running mate		
Presidential candidate	Party	Home state	Count	Percentage	Electoral vote	Vice-presidential candidate	Home state	Electoral vote
Theodore Roosevelt (incumbent)	Republican	New York	7,630,457	56.42%	336	Charles W. Fairbanks	Indiana	336
Alton B. Parker	Democratic	New York	5,083,880	37.59%	140	Henry Gassaway Davis	West Virginia	140
Eugene V. Debs	Socialist	Indiana	402,810	2.98%	0	Benjamin Hanford	New York	0
Silas C. Swallow	Prohibition	Pennsylvania	259,102	1.92%	0	George Washington Carroll	Texas	0
Thomas E. Watson	Populist	Georgia	114,070	0.84%	0	Thomas Tibbles	Nebraska	0
Charles Hunter Corregan	Socialist Labor	New York	33,454	0.25%	0	William Wesley Cox	Illinois	0
Other			1,229	0.01%	—	Other		—
Total			13,525,002	100%	476			476
Needed to win					239			239

Source (popular vote): Leip, David. "1904 Presidential Election Results". Dave Leip's Atlas of U.S. Presidential Elections.

Source (electoral vote): "Electoral College Box Scores 1789–1996". National Archives and Records Administration.

Popular vote
Roosevelt	56.42%
Parker	37.59%
Debs	2.98%
Swallow	1.92%
Watson	0.84%
Others	0.26%

Electoral vote
Roosevelt	70.59%
Parker	29.41%

=== Geography of results ===
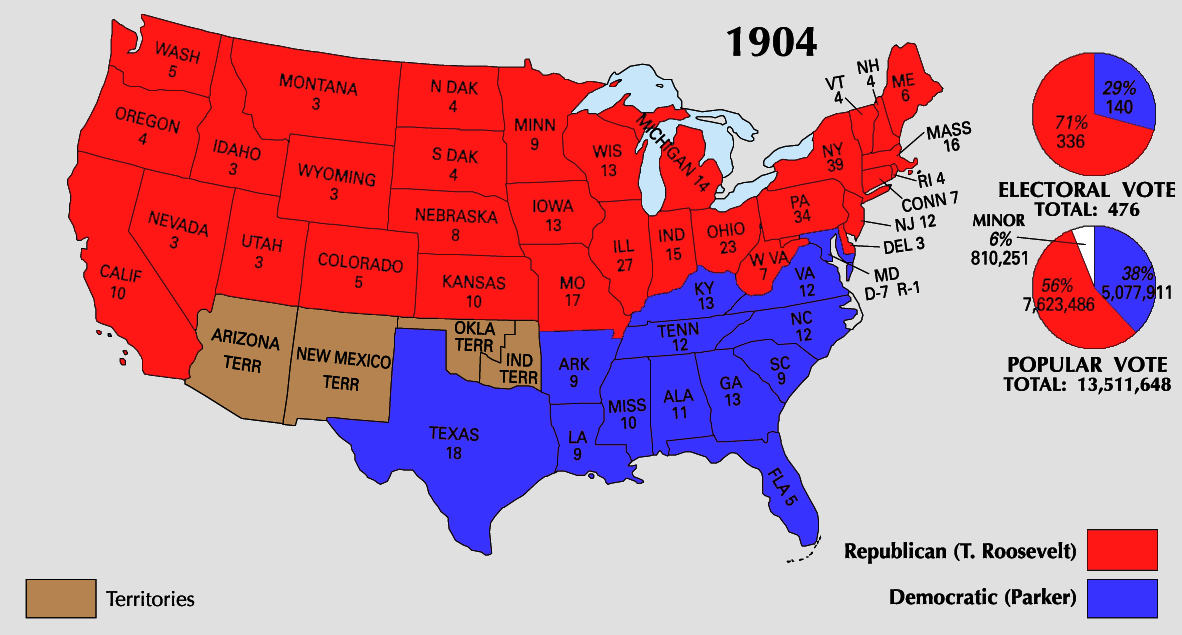

Results by county, shaded according to winning candidate's percentage of the vote

==== Cartographic gallery ====
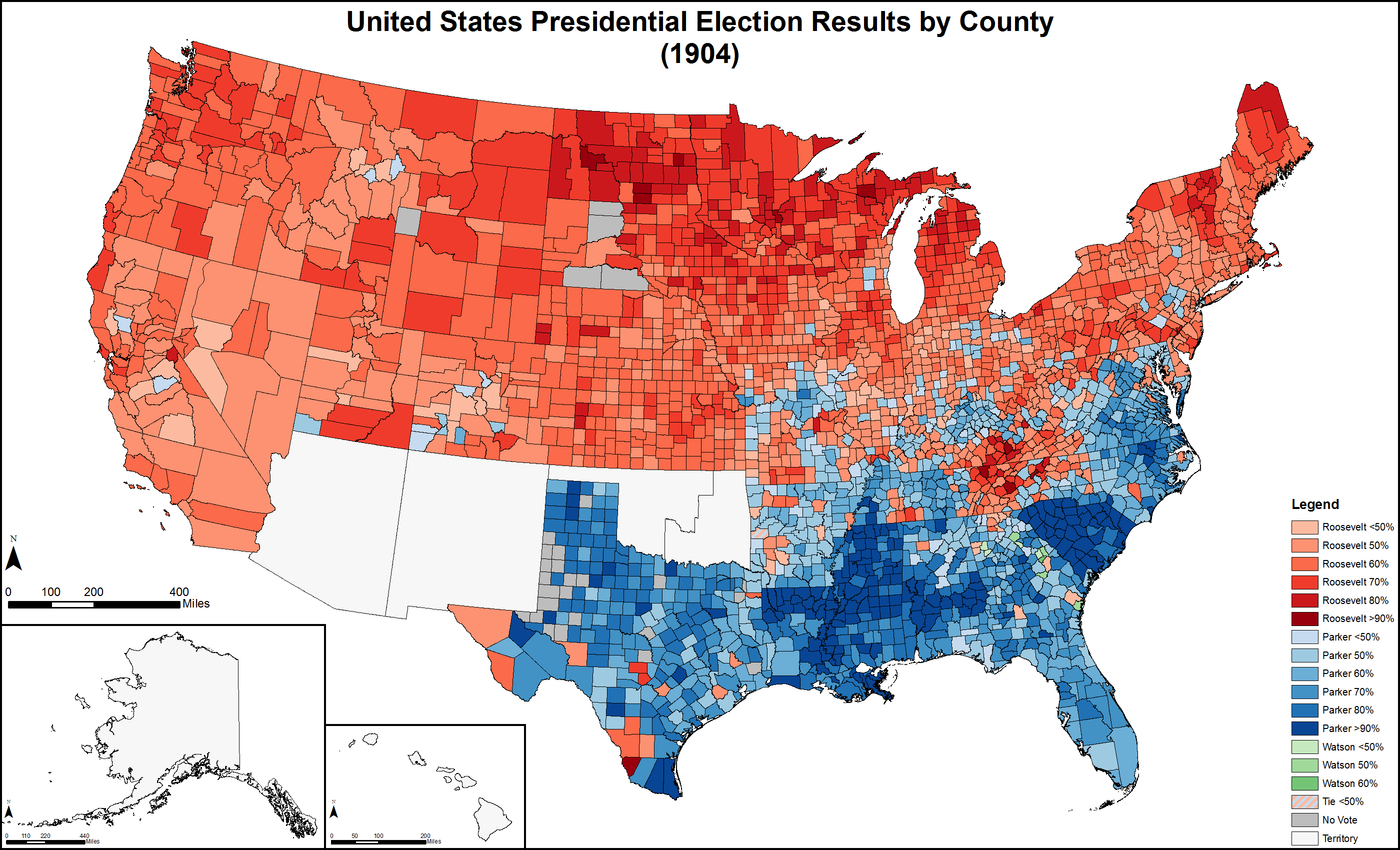
Map of presidential election results by county

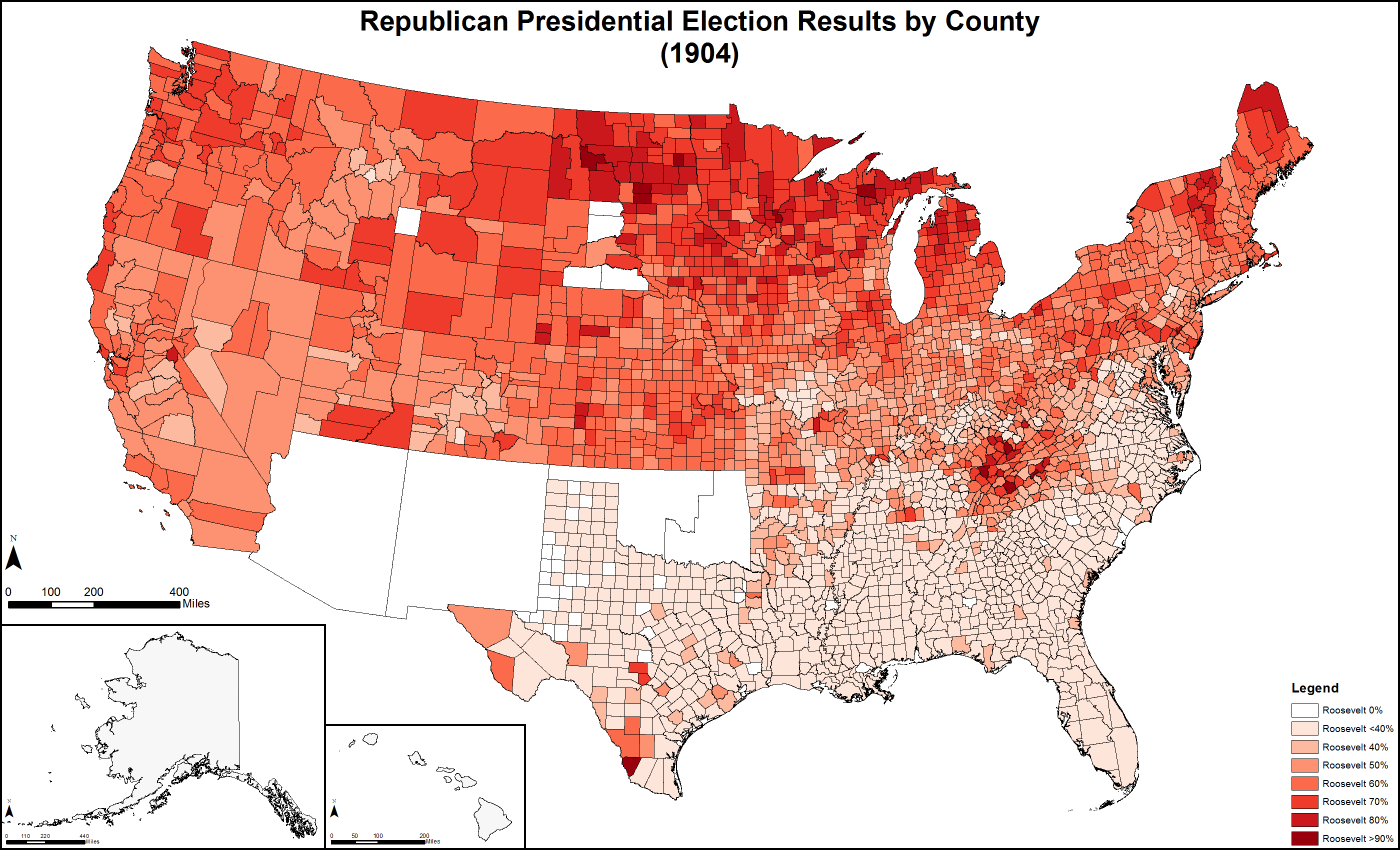
Map of Republican presidential election results by county

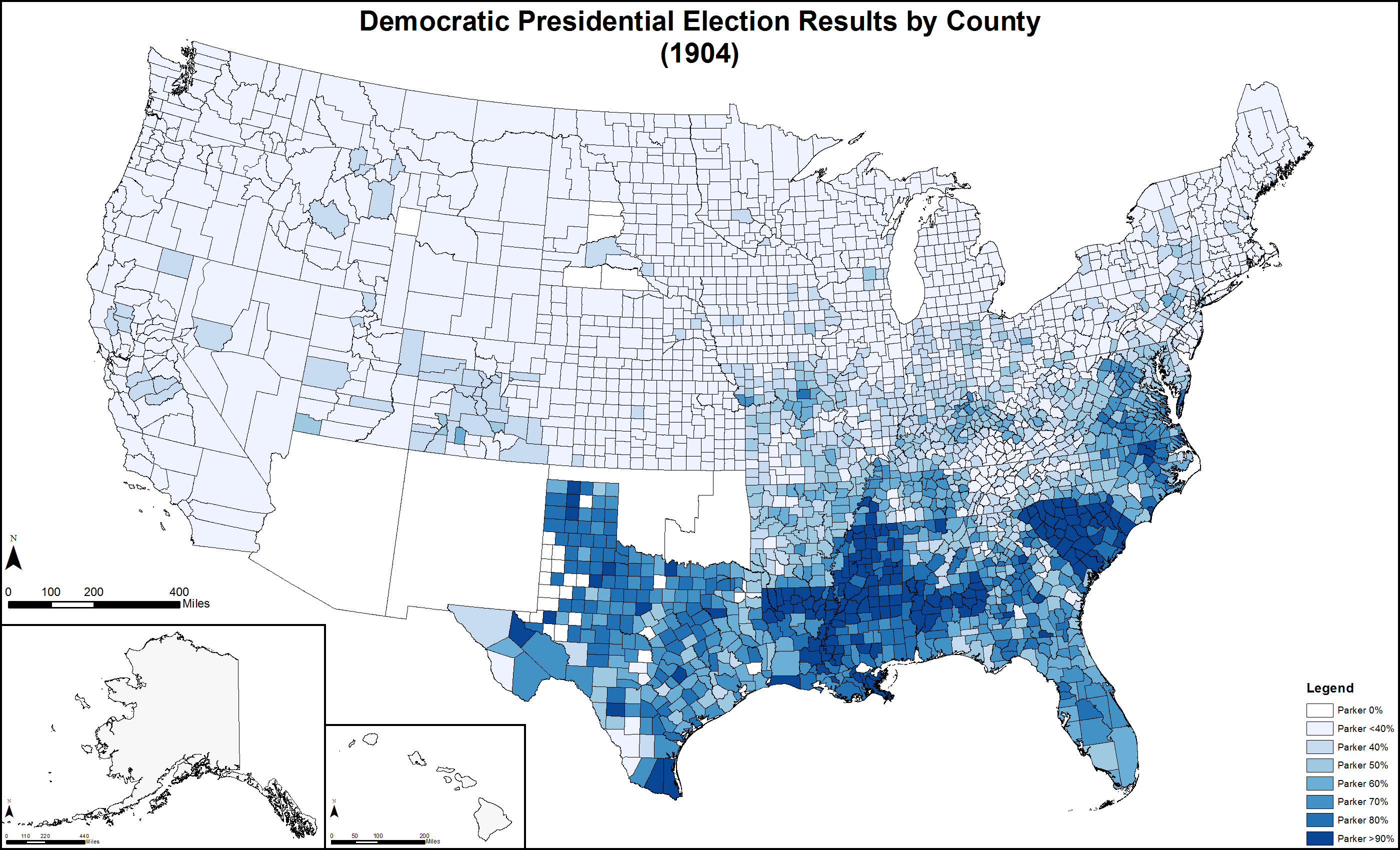
Map of Democratic presidential election results by county

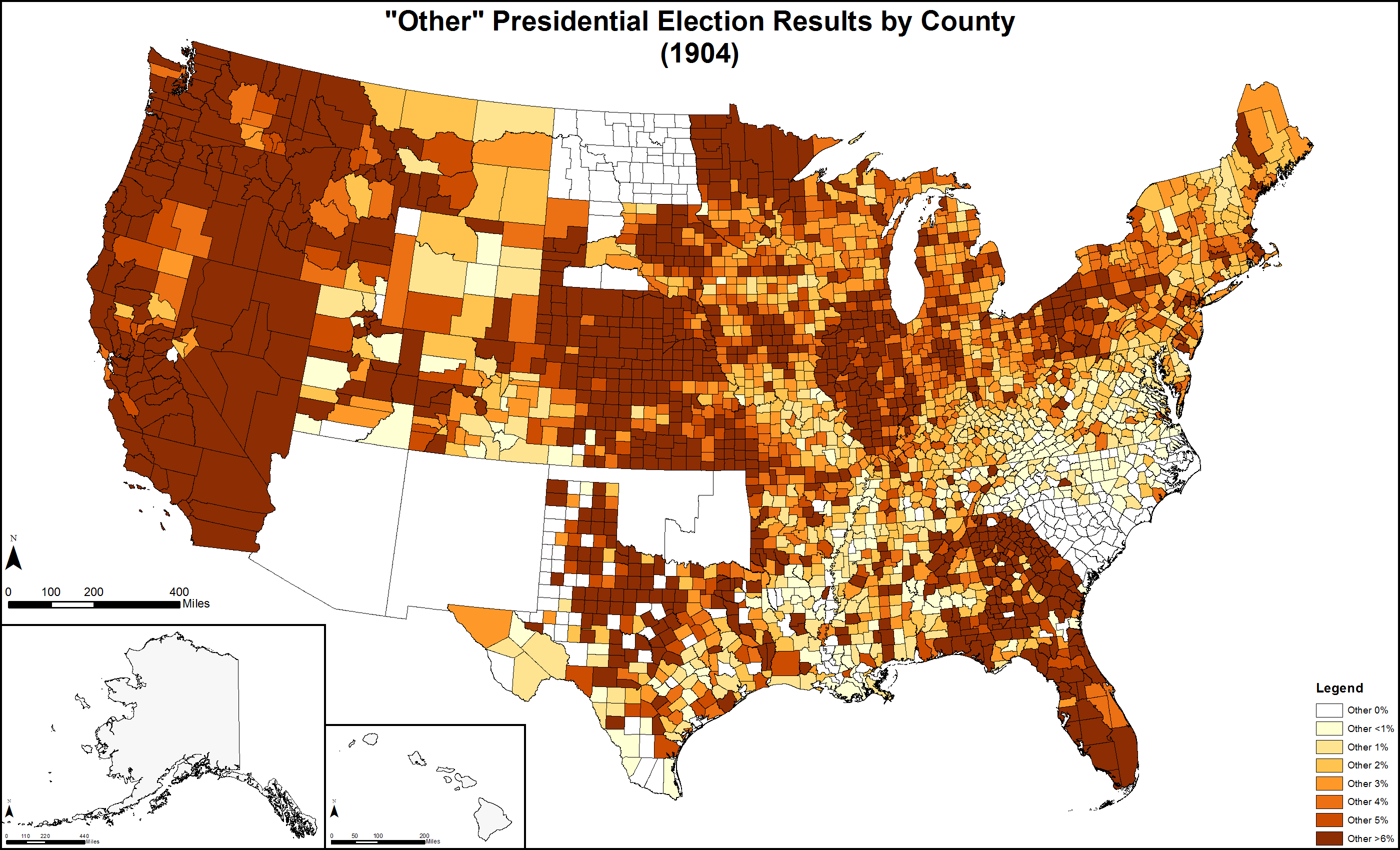
Map of "other" presidential election results by county

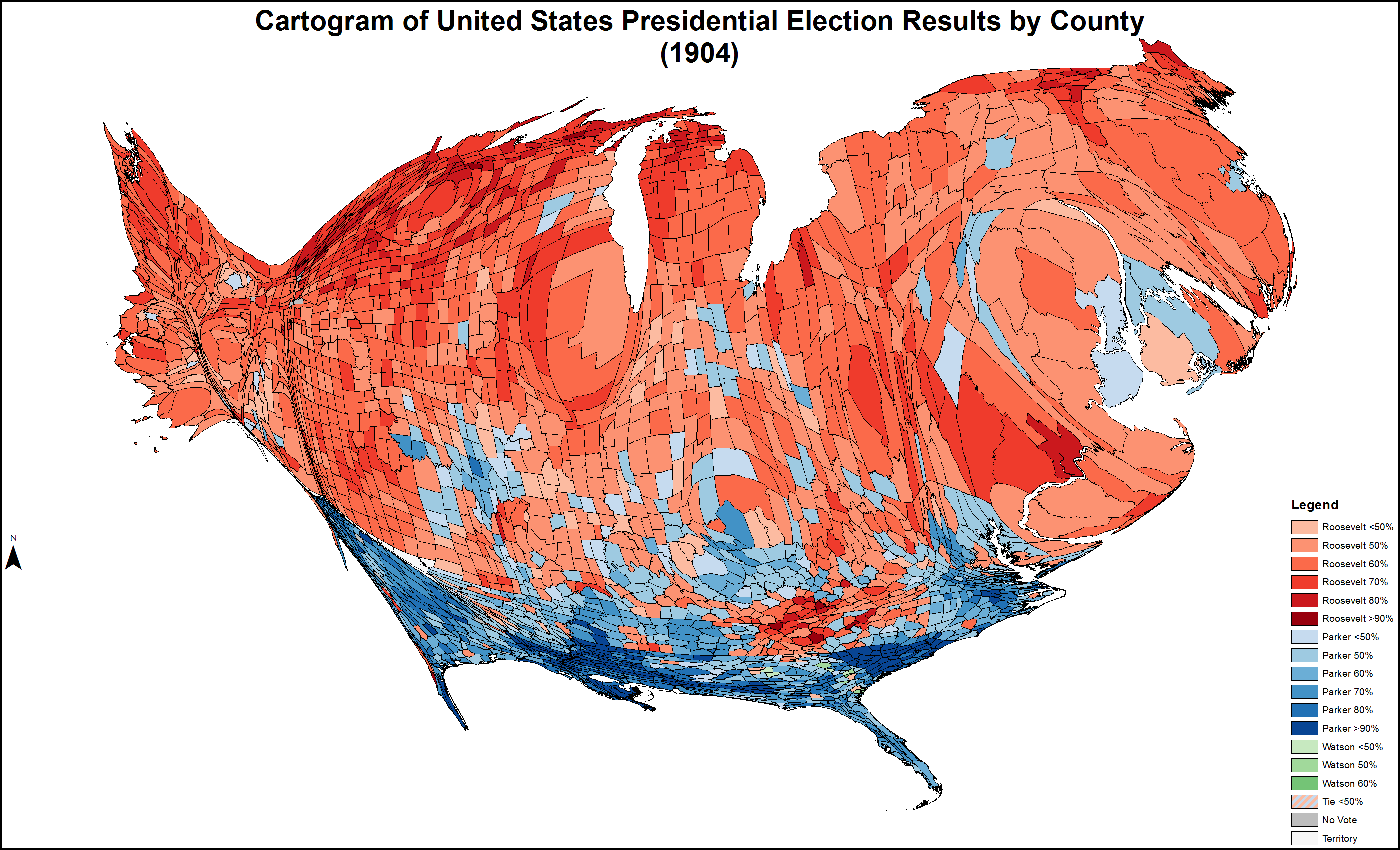
Cartogram of presidential election results by county

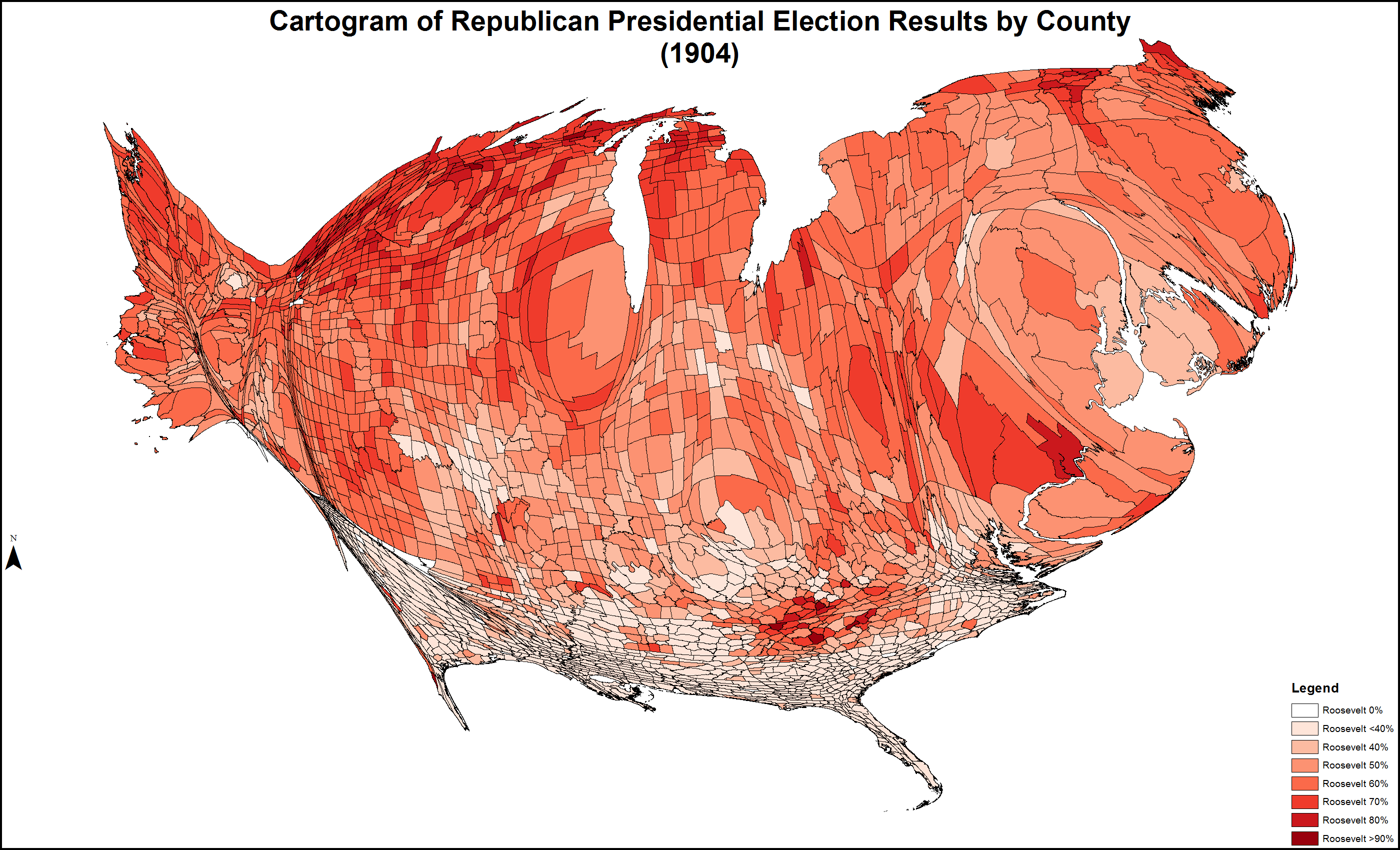
Cartogram of Republican presidential election results by county

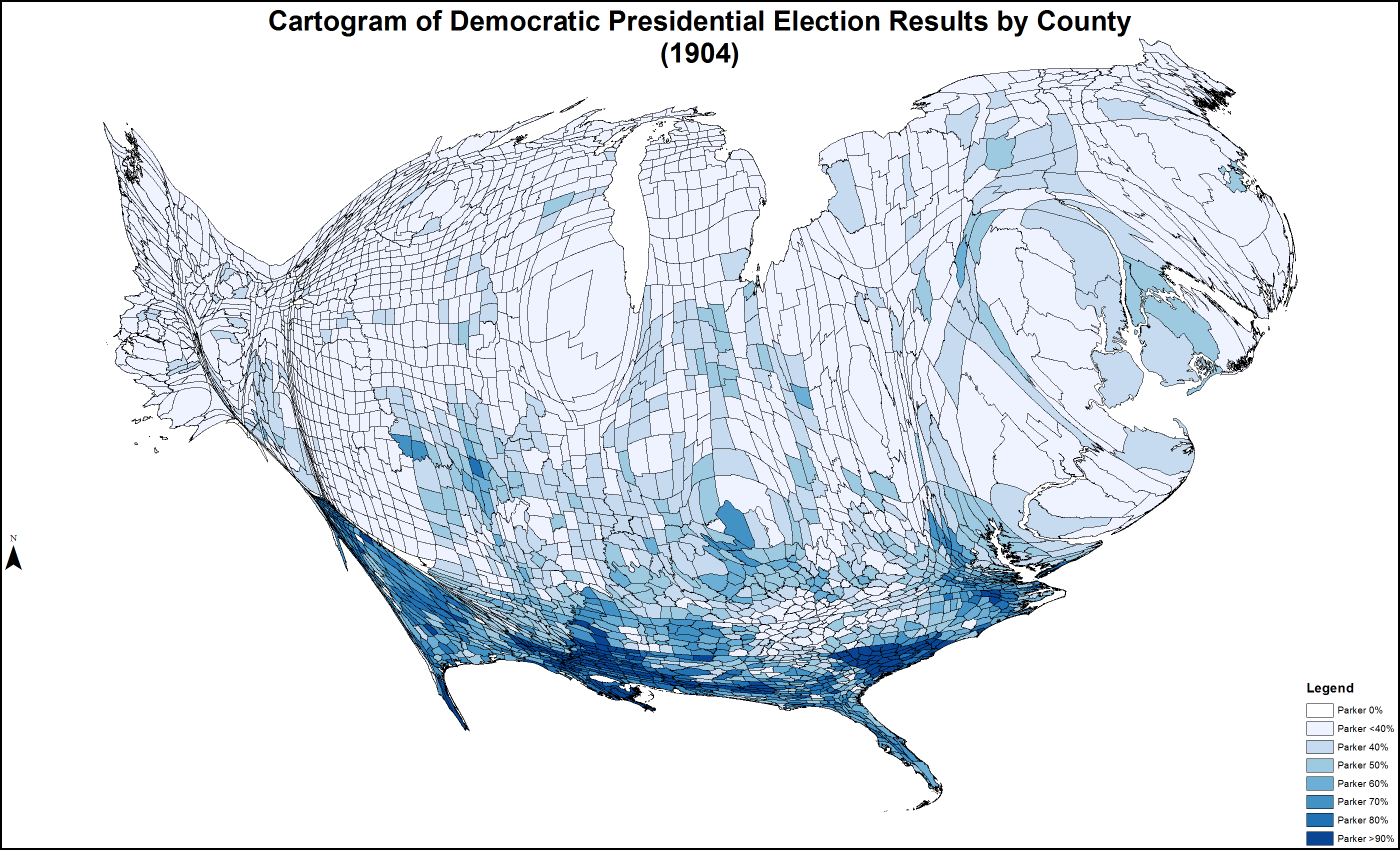
Cartogram of Democratic presidential election results by county

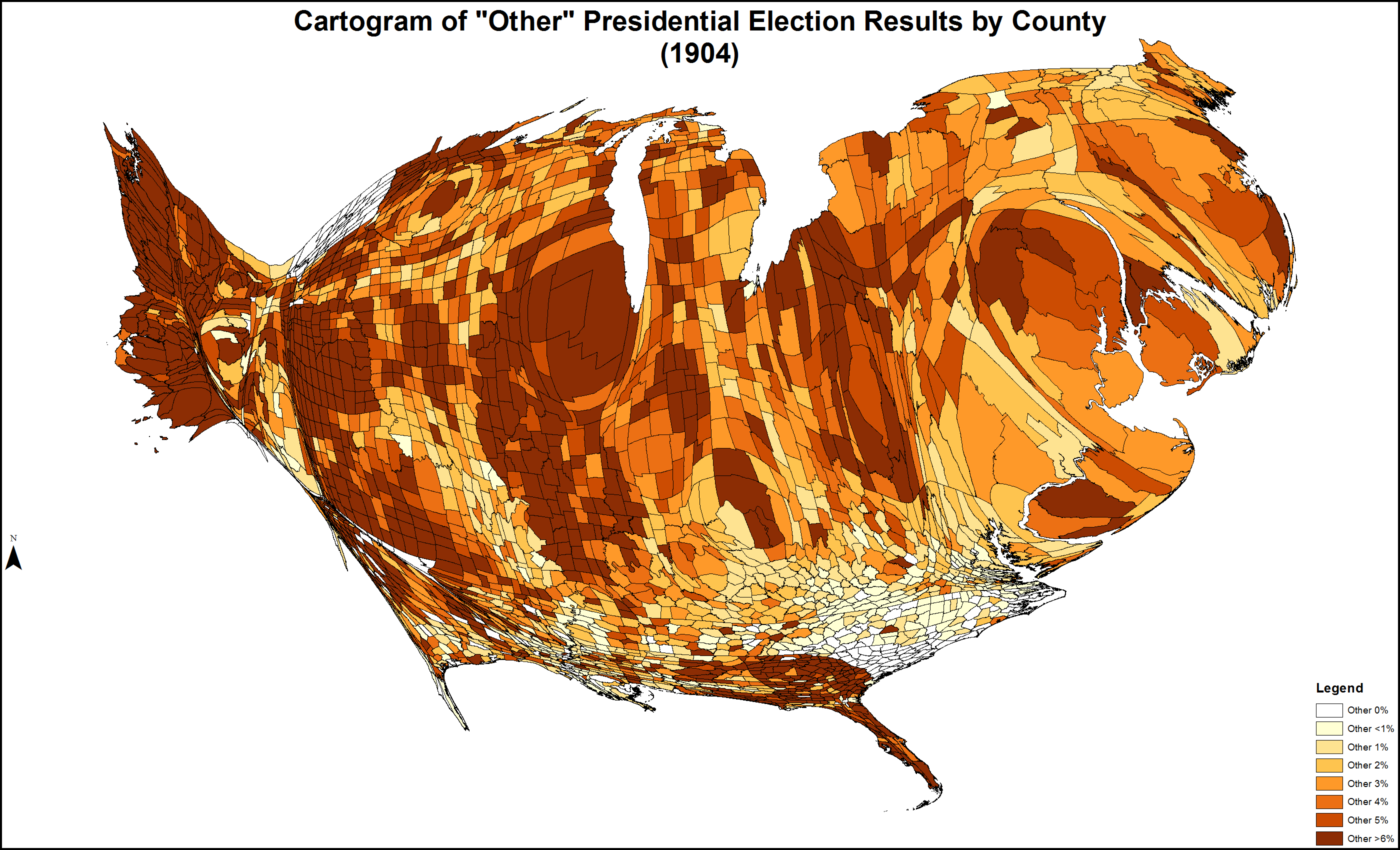
Cartogram of "other" presidential election results by county

State Level Performance for Eugene Debs' Presidential Campaign, 1904 (Socialist Party)

=== Results by state ===
States/districts won by Parker/Davis
States/districts won by Roosevelt/Fairbanks

		Theodore Roosevelt Republican			Alton B. Parker Democratic			Eugene V. Debs Socialist			Silas Swallow Prohibition			Thomas Watson Populist			Charles Corregan Socialist Labor			Margin		State total	
State	electoral votes	#	%	electoral votes	#	%	electoral votes	#	%	electoral votes	#	%	electoral votes	#	%	electoral votes	#	%	electoral votes	#	%	#	
Alabama	11	22,472	20.66	-	79,797	73.35	11	853	0.78	-	612	0.56	-	5,051	4.64	-	-	-	-	-57,325	-52.70	108,785	AL
Arkansas	9	46,860	40.25	-	64,434	55.35	9	1,816	1.56	-	993	0.85	-	2,318	1.99	-	-	-	-	-17,574	-15.10	116,421	AR
California	10	205,226	61.84	10	89,404	26.94	-	29,535	8.90	-	7,380	2.22	-	2	0.00	-	-	-	-	115,822	34.90	331,878	CA
Colorado	5	134,661	55.26	5	100,105	41.08	-	4,304	1.77	-	3,438	1.41	-	824	0.34	-	335	0.14	-	34,556	14.18	243,667	CO
Connecticut	7	111,089	58.12	7	72,909	38.15	-	4,543	2.38	-	1,506	0.79	-	495	0.26	-	575	0.30	-	38,180	19.98	191,128	CT
Delaware	3	23,705	54.05	3	19,347	44.11	-	146	0.33	-	607	1.38	-	51	0.12	-	-	-	-	4,358	9.94	43,856	DE
Florida	5	8,314	21.48	-	26,449	68.33	5	2,337	6.04	-	-	-	-	1,605	4.15	-	-	-	-	-18,135	-46.85	38,705	FL
Georgia	13	24,004	18.33	-	83,466	63.72	13	196	0.15	-	685	0.52	-	22,635	17.28	-	-	-	-	-59,462	-45.40	130,986	GA
Idaho	3	47,783	65.84	3	18,480	25.46	-	4,949	6.82	-	1,013	1.40	-	353	0.49	-	-	-	-	29,303	40.37	72,578	ID
Illinois	27	632,645	58.77	27	327,606	30.43	-	69,225	6.43	-	34,770	3.23	-	6,725	0.62	-	4,698	0.44	-	305,039	28.34	1,076,499	IL
Indiana	15	368,289	53.99	15	274,345	40.22	-	12,013	1.76	-	23,496	3.44	-	2,444	0.36	-	1,598	0.23	-	93,944	13.77	682,185	IN
Iowa	13	308,158	63.39	13	149,276	30.71	-	14,849	3.05	-	11,603	2.39	-	2,207	0.45	-	-	-	-	158,882	32.69	486,093	IA
Kansas	10	212,955	64.81	10	86,174	26.23	-	15,869	4.83	-	7,306	2.22	-	6,257	1.90	-	-	-	-	126,781	38.59	328,561	KS
Kentucky	13	205,457	47.13	-	217,170	49.82	13	3,599	0.83	-	6,603	1.51	-	2,521	0.58	-	596	0.14	-	-11,713	-2.69	435,946	KY
Louisiana	9	5,205	9.66	-	47,708	88.50	9	995	1.85	-	-	-	-	-	-	-	-	-	-	-42,503	-78.84	53,908	LA
Maine	6	65,432	67.44	6	27,642	28.49	-	2,102	2.17	-	1,510	1.56	-	337	0.35	-	-	-	-	37,790	38.95	97,023	ME
Maryland	8	109,497	48.83	1	109,446	48.81	7	2,247	1.00	-	3,034	1.35	-	1	0.00	-	-	-	-	51	0.02	224,229	MD
Massachusetts	16	257,822	57.92	16	165,746	37.24	-	13,604	3.06	-	4,279	0.96	-	1,294	0.29	-	2,359	0.53	-	92,076	20.69	445,109	MA
Michigan	14	364,957	69.51	14	135,392	25.79	-	9,042	1.72	-	13,441	2.56	-	1,159	0.22	-	1,036	0.20	-	229,565	43.72	525,027	MI
Minnesota	11	216,651	73.98	11	55,187	18.84	-	11,692	3.99	-	6,253	2.14	-	2,103	0.72	-	974	0.33	-	161,464	55.13	292,860	MN
Mississippi	10	3,280	5.59	-	53,480	91.07	10	462	0.79	-	-	-	-	1,499	2.55	-	-	-	-	-50,200	-85.49	58,721	MS
Missouri	18	321,449	49.93	18	296,312	46.02	-	13,009	2.02	-	7,191	1.12	-	4,226	0.66	-	1,674	0.26	-	25,137	3.90	643,861	MO
Montana	3	34,932	54.21	3	21,773	33.79	-	5,676	8.81	-	335	0.52	-	1,520	2.36	-	208	0.32	-	13,159	20.42	64,444	MT
Nebraska	8	138,558	61.38	8	52,921	23.44	-	7,412	3.28	-	6,323	2.80	-	20,518	9.09	-	-	-	-	85,637	37.94	225,732	NE
Nevada	3	6,864	56.66	3	3,982	32.87	-	925	7.64	-	-	-	-	344	2.84	-	-	-	-	2,882	23.79	12,115	NV
New Hampshire	4	54,163	60.07	4	34,074	37.79	-	1,090	1.21	-	750	0.83	-	83	0.09	-	-	-	-	20,089	22.28	90,161	NH
New Jersey	12	245,164	56.68	12	164,566	38.05	-	9,587	2.22	-	6,845	1.58	-	3,705	0.86	-	2,680	0.62	-	80,598	18.63	432,547	NJ
New York	39	859,533	53.13	39	683,981	42.28	-	36,883	2.28	-	20,787	1.28	-	7,459	0.46	-	9,127	0.56	-	175,552	10.85	1,617,770	NY
North Carolina	12	82,442	39.67	-	124,091	59.71	12	124	0.06	-	342	0.16	-	819	0.39	-	-	-	-	-41,649	-20.04	207,818	NC
North Dakota	4	52,595	75.12	4	14,273	20.39	-	2,009	2.87	-	1,137	1.62	-	-	-	-	-	-	-	38,322	54.73	70,014	ND
Ohio	23	600,095	59.75	23	344,674	34.32	-	36,260	3.61	-	19,339	1.93	-	1,392	0.14	-	2,633	0.26	-	255,421	25.43	1,004,393	OH
Oregon	4	60,455	67.06	4	17,521	19.43	-	7,619	8.45	-	3,806	4.22	-	753	0.84	-	-	-	-	42,934	47.62	90,154	OR
Pennsylvania	34	840,949	68.00	34	337,998	27.33	-	21,863	1.77	-	33,717	2.73	-	-	-	-	2,211	0.18	-	502,951	40.67	1,236,738	PA
Rhode Island	4	41,605	60.60	4	24,839	36.18	-	956	1.39	-	768	1.12	-	-	-	-	488	0.71	-	16,766	24.42	68,656	RI
South Carolina	9	2,554	4.63	-	52,563	95.36	9	-	-	-	-	-	-	1	0.00	-	-	-	-	-50,009	-90.73	55,118	SC
South Dakota	4	72,083	71.09	4	21,969	21.67	-	3,138	3.09	-	2,965	2.92	-	1,240	1.22	-	-	-	-	50,114	49.42	101,395	SD
Tennessee	12	105,363	43.40	-	131,653	54.23	12	1,354	0.56	-	1,889	0.78	-	2,491	1.03	-	-	-	-	-26,290	-10.83	242,750	TN
Texas	18	51,242	21.90	-	167,200	71.45	18	2,791	1.19	-	4,292	1.83	-	8,062	3.45	-	421	0.18	-	-115,958	-49.55	234,008	TX
Utah	3	62,446	61.42	3	33,413	32.86	-	5,767	5.67	-	-	-	-	-	-	-	-	-	-	29,033	28.56	101,672	UT
Vermont	4	40,459	77.97	4	9,777	18.84	-	859	1.66	-	792	1.53	-	-	-	-	-	-	-	30,682	59.13	51,888	VT
Virginia	12	48,180	36.95	-	80,649	61.84	12	202	0.15	-	1,379	1.06	-	-	-	-	-	-	-	-32,469	-24.90	130,410	VA
Washington	5	101,540	69.95	5	28,098	19.36	-	10,023	6.91	-	3,229	2.22	-	669	0.46	-	1,592	1.10	-	73,442	50.60	145,151	WA
West Virginia	7	132,620	55.26	7	100,855	42.03	-	1,573	0.66	-	4,599	1.92	-	339	0.14	-	-	-	-	31,765	13.24	239,986	WV
Wisconsin	13	280,315	63.21	13	124,205	28.01	-	28,240	6.37	-	9,872	2.23	-	560	0.13	-	249	0.06	-	156,110	35.20	443,441	WI
Wyoming	3	20,489	66.72	3	8,930	29.08	-	1,072	3.49	-	217	0.71	-	-	-	-	-	-	-	11,559	37.64	30,708	WY
TOTALS:	476	7,630,557	56.42	336	5,083,880	37.59	140	402,810	2.98	-	259,103	1.92	-	114,062	0.84	-	33,454	0.25	-	2,546,677	18.83	13,525,095	US

=== States that flipped from Democratic to Republican ===
- Colorado
- Idaho
- Missouri
- Montana
- Nevada

=== States that flipped from Republican to Democratic ===
- Maryland

=== Close states ===
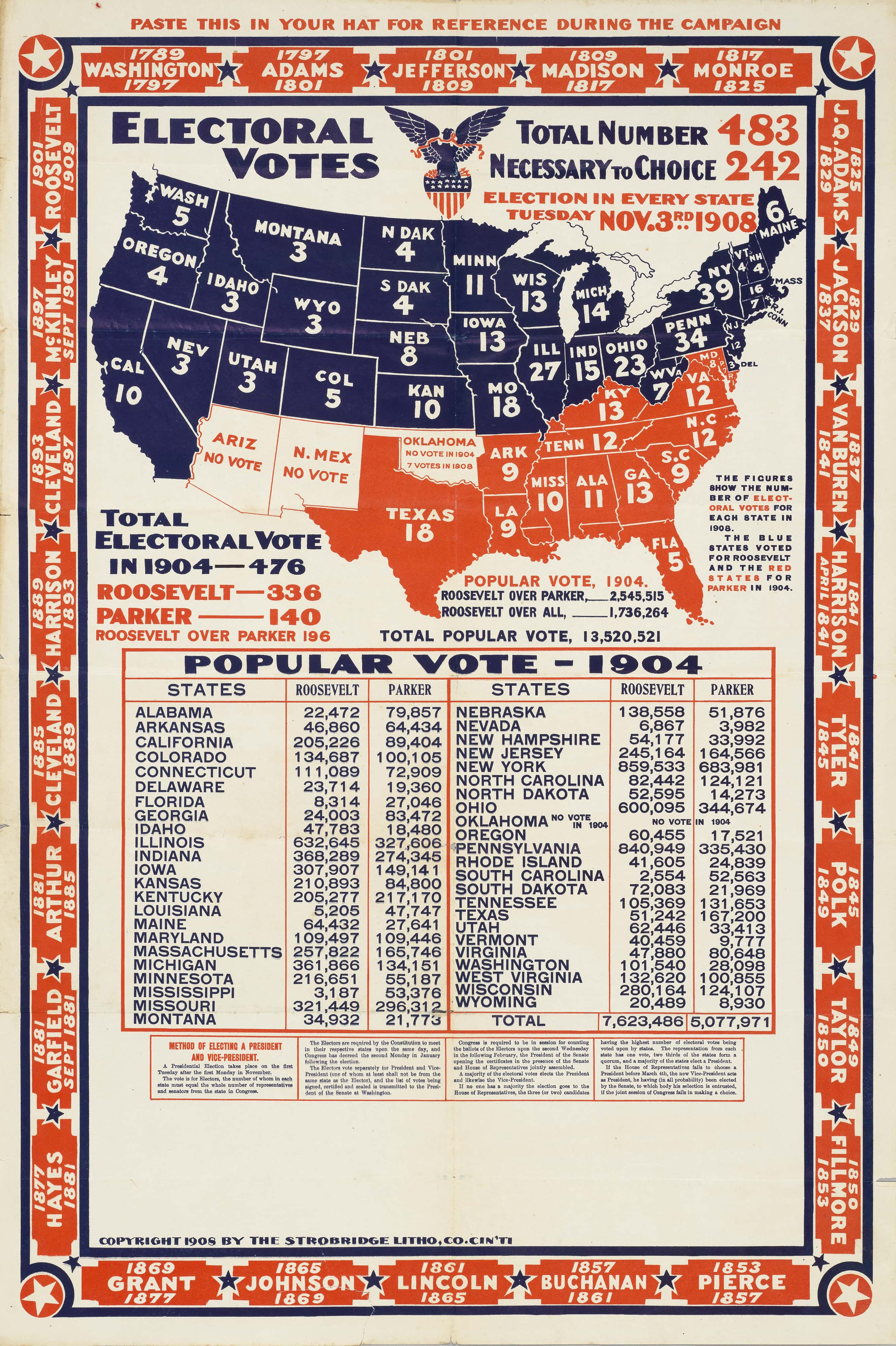
A poster created by the Strobridge Lithographing Company of the election results

Margin of victory less than 1% (8 electoral votes):

1. Maryland, 0.02% (51 votes)

Margin of victory less than 5% (31 electoral votes):

1. Kentucky, 2.69% (11,713 votes)
2. Missouri, 3.90% (25,137 votes)

Margin of victory between 5% and 10% (3 electoral votes):

1. Delaware, 9.94% (4,358 votes)

Tipping point state:

1. New Jersey, 18.63% (80,598 votes)

==== Statistics ====
Counties with Highest Percent of Vote (Republican)

1. Keweenaw County, Michigan 94.55%
2. Mercer County, North Dakota 93.68%
3. Logan County, North Dakota 93.61%
4. McIntosh County, North Dakota 92.70%
5. Zapata County, Texas 92.48%

Counties with Highest Percent of Vote (Democratic)

1. Horry County, South Carolina 100.00%
2. Georgetown County, South Carolina 100.00%
3. Fairfield County, South Carolina 100.00%
4. Madison Parish, Louisiana 100.00%
5. Potter County, Texas 100.00%

Counties with Highest Percent of Vote (Populist)

1. Glascock County, Georgia 69.38%
2. McDuffie County, Georgia 58.59%
3. McIntosh County, Georgia 56.55%
4. Jackson County, Georgia 55.29%
5. Johnson County, Georgia 53.05%

== See also ==
- History of the United States (1865–1918)
- Newspaper endorsements in the 1904 United States presidential election
- 1904 United States House of Representatives elections
- 1904–05 United States Senate elections
- Second inauguration of Theodore Roosevelt

== Works cited ==
- Abramson, Paul; Aldrich, John; Rohde, David (1995). Change and Continuity in the 1992 Elections. CQ Press. ISBN 0871878399.
- Sherman, Richard (1973). The Republican Party and Black America From McKinley to Hoover 1896-1933. University of Virginia Press. ISBN 0813904676.
