= William Wesley Cox =

American politician

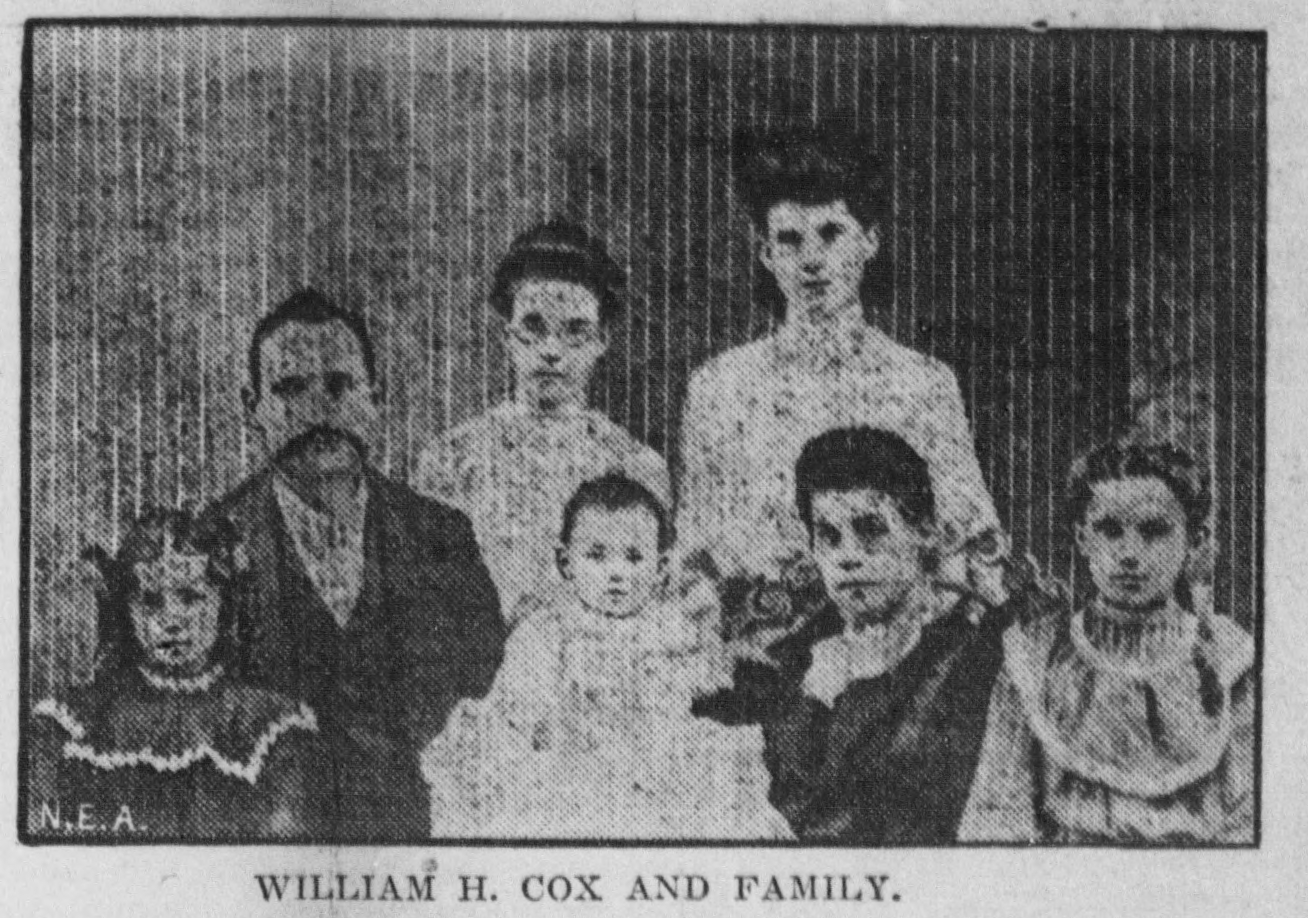
Cox and family in 1904

William Wesley Cox (February 5, 1865 – October 29, 1948) was a presidential, vice presidential, and perennial U.S. Senate candidate of the Socialist Labor Party of America (SLP).

Cox was born in Illinois, later moving to Missouri. He was the Missouri state chairman of the SLP, and was an interior decorator by profession. He was an agnostic and member of the American Civil Liberties Union.

After serving as SLP vice-presidential candidate in 1904, Cox was nominated by the SLP for president in 1920, winning 31,084 votes. He ran in many elections, and his last attempt at office was in 1944, running for the United States Senate seat in Missouri, at the age of 79. Cox died of an apoplexy four years later on October 29, 1948, at the age of 83.
