= 1955 Prohibition National Convention =

- 1956 presidential election

Convention
- Dates: September 1955
- City: Milford, Kosciusko County, Indiana
- Venue: Camp Mack
- Keynote speaker: William Langer of North Dakota

Candidates
- Presidential nominee: Enoch A. Holtwick of Illinois
- Vice-presidential nominee: Herbert C. Holdridge of California later replaced (Note: Holdridge was later replaced on the ticket by Edwin M. Cooper)

Voting
- Total delegates: ~300
- Ballots: 1

The 1955 Prohibition National Convention was held in September 1955 at Camp Mack in Milford in Kosciusko County, Indiana. It nominated Enoch A. Holtwick of Illinois for president and Herbert C. Holdridge of California for vice president.

== Logistics ==
The convention was held in early September 1955 at Camp Mack in Milford, a town in the Van Buren Township of Kosciusko County, Indiana. The state of Indiana was a regular location for the party's conventions. Indianapolis had been the site of the 1888, 1904, 1932, 1943, and 1951 conventions. Winona Lake (near to Milford) had previously hosted the 1947 convention, and after 1955 was the site of the party's convention again in 1959 convention.

Approximately 300 delegates attended the convention.

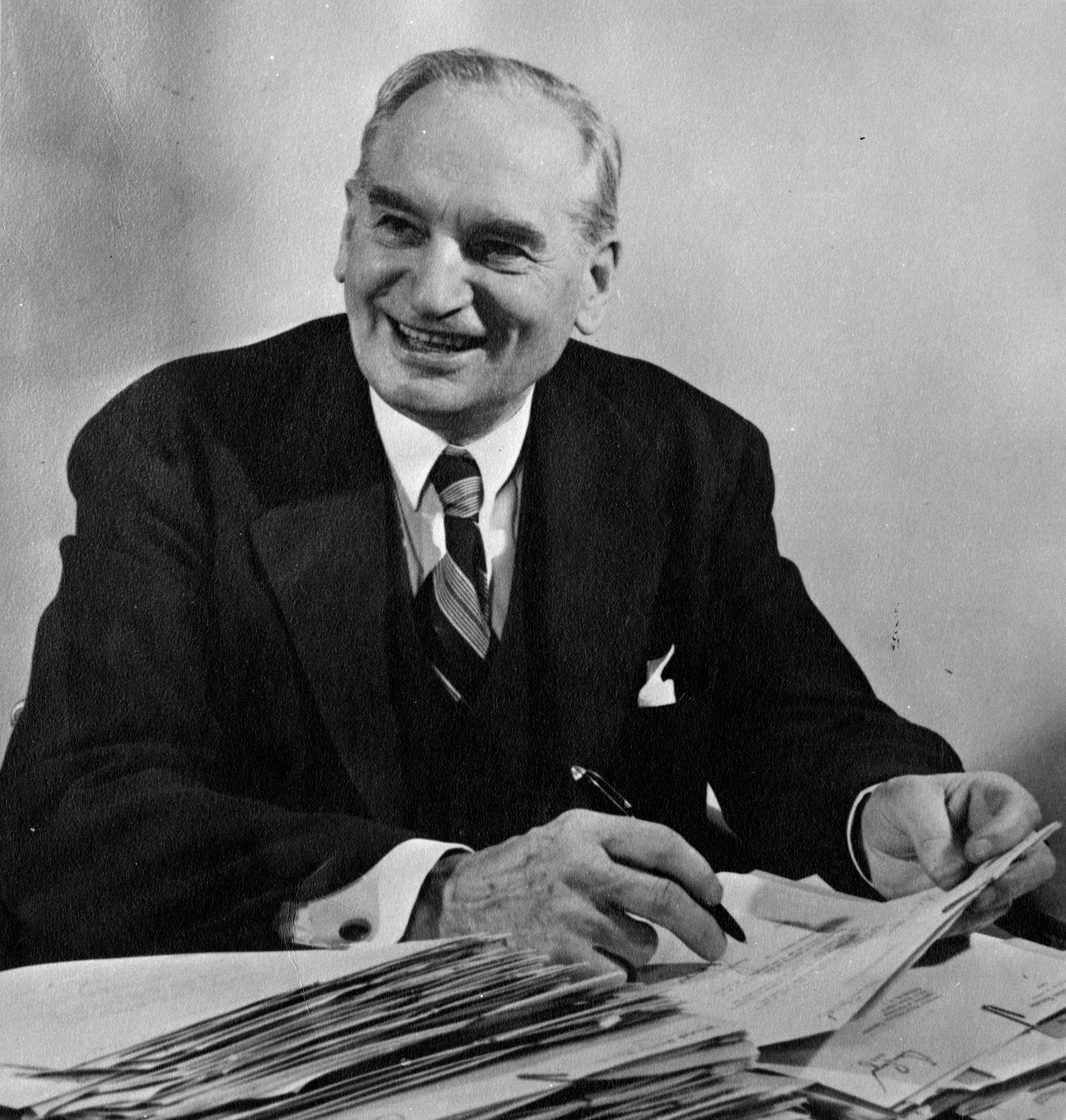
William Langer delivered the keynote address

Enoch A. Holtwick served as presiding officer during the convention. The keynote address was delivered by William Langer, Republican U.S. senator from North Dakota.

== Nominations ==
Herbert C. Holdridge (photographed in 1943) was nominated at the convention for vice president, but was later replaced on the ticket

Ahead of the convention, many delegates indicated an interest in nominating Langer.

The convention selected its nominees on September 6. For president, it nominated Enoch Holtwick of Illinois, and nominated Herbert C. Holdridge for vice president.

After Holdridge distributed strongly anti-President Eisenhower pamphlets on the floor of the 1956 Republican National Convention, he was replaced as Prohibition vice presidential nominee by Edwin M. Cooper.

== Platform ==
At the convention, the party adopted a new platform. The platform retained the party's traditional temperance stance opposing the consumption of alcoholic beverages. The 1955 platform advocated that increased educational standards be created, arguing that they would lead to lower drinking rates. The platform also urged for the psychiatric treatment of alcoholics, and called for the end of the legalized sale of whisky. Beyond this, the platform also notably opposed universal military training.

The platform avoided use of the word "prohibition" except as a proper noun to refer to the party itself. This was due to its view that the term had come to be "much misunderstood". However, the platform still was rooted in temperance, with the party still seeking to abolish the liquor industry. The platform included a denunciation of what it called, "the highly capitalized, strongly organized and socially irresponsible liquor industry, and called for, "removing the causes of drinking.

The platform opposed the Reserve Forces Act of 1955 (compulsory reserve forces plan adopted in Congress). It called for all weapons of mass annihilation to be outlawed. It called for the immediate granting of statehood to Alaska and Hawaii. It also called for farm surpluses to be shared in order to address global hunger.

== Party chairman vote ==
At the convention, E. Harold Munn was elected as the national chairman of the party without any opposition.
