= 1947 Prohibition National Convention =

American political convention

- 1948 presidential election

Convention
- Date(s): June 26–28, 1947
- City: Winona Lake, Indiana
- Venue: Billy Sunday Tabernacle
- Keynote speaker: Edward E. Blake

Candidates
- Presidential nominee: Claude A. Watson of California
- Vice-presidential nominee: Dale H. Learn of Pennsylvania

Voting
- Total delegates: 715 (allocated)

The 1947 Prohibition National Convention was held June 26–28, 1947, at the Billy Sunday Tabernacle in Winona Lake, Indiana. It saw the Prohibition Party nominate Claude A. Watson for president and Dale H. Learn for vice president in the 1948 United States presidential election.

== Logistics ==
The convention was held in at the Billy Sunday Tabernacle in Winona Lake, Indiana, behind held June 26–28, 1947. Convention organizers expected attendance by 715 delegates.

The state of Indiana was a regular location for the party's conventions. Indianapolis had been the site of the 1888, 1904, 1932, and 1943 conventions; and was soon after the site of its 1951 convention. Winona Lake soon after was the site of the party's convention again in 1959, while nearby Milford was the site of its convention in 1955.

Winona Lake had been a hub for prohibitionist movements, ever since Billy Sunday moved to the town in 1911.

An keynote address was delivered by Party Chairman Edward E. Blake at the opening of the convention. The party's platform was adopted on the second day of the convention, and its ticket was nominated on the third. Additionally, Enoch A. Holtwick served as presiding officer during the convention.

== Presidential nomination ==
Ahead of the convention, four individuals put themselves forward as candidates for the presidential nomination:

- D. Leigh Colvin of New York, 1936 presidential nominee of the party
- Dale H. Learn, Pennsylvania favorite son, and past nominee in the 1942 Pennsylvania gubernatorial election.
- Sam Morris of Texas, candidate at the 1944 convention
- Claude A. Watson of California, 1944 presidential nominee of the party

At the convention, delegates unanimously nominated Watson of California for president.

== Vice presidential nomination ==
The convention unanimously nominated Dale H. Learn of Pennsylvania for vice president.

Hearn accepted the nomination months later on November 20, 1947, before a crowd of 175 people at The Inn at Buck Hill Falls in Barrett Township, Pennsylvania.
