= 1956 United States presidential election in Michigan =

- November 6, 1956

All 20 Michigan votes to the Electoral College
- Turnout: 67.9% ▲

Nominee	Dwight D. Eisenhower	Adlai Stevenson
Party	Republican	Democratic
Home state	Pennsylvania	Illinois
Running mate	Richard Nixon	Estes Kefauver
Electoral vote	20	0
Popular vote	1,713,647	1,359,898
Percentage	55.63%	44.15%
County results
Eisenhower
50–60%
60–70%
70–80%
Stevenson
50–60%
President before election
Dwight D. Eisenhower
Republican
Elected President
Dwight D. Eisenhower
Republican

The 1956 United States presidential election in Michigan was held on November 6, 1956, as part of the 1956 United States presidential election. Voters chose 20 electors to the Electoral College, who voted for president and vice president.

Michigan was won by the Republican Party candidate Dwight D. Eisenhower with 56% of the popular vote, winning the state's twenty electoral votes. However, this result made Michigan almost 4% more Democratic than the nation-at-large, the first time since 1864 that the state voted to the left of the national result, which was the only prior time Michigan had done so since the founding of the Republican Party in 1854.

Eisenhower would be the last Republican to win Michigan without carrying suburban Macomb County, which he previously won in 1952, but lost to Stevenson in this election. He became the first ever Republican to win the White House without carrying Alger County, as well as the first to do so without carrying Macomb County since Benjamin Harrison in 1888.

This was the last time Michigan voted for a Republican presidential candidate until Eisenhower's vice president, Richard Nixon, won the state in his re-election bid in 1972.

== Results ==
1956 United States presidential election in Michigan
Party	Candidate	Votes	%
Republican	Dwight D. Eisenhower (inc.)	1,713,647	55.63%
Democratic	Adlai Stevenson	1,359,898	44.15%
Prohibition	Enoch Holtwick	6,923	0.22%
Total votes		3,080,468	100.00%

=== Results by county ===
County	Dwight D. Eisenhower Republican		Adlai Stevenson Democratic		Enoch Holtwick Prohibition		Margin		Total votes cast
County	#	%	#	%	#	%	#	%	Total votes cast
Alcona	1,991	71.52%	788	28.30%	5	0.18%	1,203	43.22%	2,784
Alger	2,070	49.37%	2,105	50.20%	18	0.43%	-35	-0.83%	4,193
Allegan	16,509	74.44%	5,617	25.33%	51	0.23%	10,892	49.11%	22,177
Alpena	7,142	70.18%	3,033	29.80%	2	0.02%	4,109	40.38%	10,177
Antrim	3,623	72.34%	1,376	27.48%	9	0.18%	2,247	44.86%	5,008
Arenac	2,631	63.32%	1,520	36.58%	4	0.10%	1,111	26.74%	4,155
Baraga	1,968	55.51%	1,574	44.40%	3	0.08%	394	11.11%	3,545
Barry	9,359	70.22%	3,907	29.31%	63	0.47%	5,452	40.91%	13,329
Bay	23,519	60.39%	15,301	39.29%	128	0.33%	8,218	21.10%	38,948
Benzie	2,620	71.18%	1,046	28.42%	15	0.41%	1,574	42.76%	3,681
Berrien	35,397	65.50%	18,454	34.15%	194	0.36%	16,943	31.35%	54,045
Branch	8,856	69.49%	3,827	30.03%	61	0.48%	5,029	39.46%	12,744
Calhoun	32,284	61.33%	20,184	38.34%	175	0.33%	12,100	22.99%	52,643
Cass	8,899	64.54%	4,842	35.12%	47	0.34%	4,057	29.42%	13,788
Charlevoix	3,924	66.80%	1,935	32.94%	15	0.26%	1,989	33.86%	5,874
Cheboygan	4,379	69.55%	1,910	30.34%	7	0.11%	2,469	39.21%	6,296
Chippewa	6,957	62.81%	4,106	37.07%	14	0.13%	2,851	25.74%	11,077
Clare	3,721	75.51%	1,194	24.23%	13	0.26%	2,527	51.28%	4,928
Clinton	10,770	74.41%	3,673	25.38%	31	0.21%	7,097	49.03%	14,474
Crawford	1,380	71.50%	547	28.34%	3	0.16%	833	43.16%	1,930
Delta	7,766	54.31%	6,489	45.38%	45	0.31%	1,277	8.93%	14,300
Dickinson	6,200	54.72%	5,113	45.13%	17	0.15%	1,087	9.59%	11,330
Eaton	13,762	69.33%	6,053	30.49%	35	0.18%	7,709	38.84%	19,850
Emmet	4,764	71.16%	1,903	28.42%	28	0.42%	2,861	42.74%	6,695
Genesee	75,431	54.47%	62,808	45.36%	235	0.17%	12,623	9.11%	138,474
Gladwin	3,121	73.47%	1,117	26.29%	10	0.24%	2,004	47.18%	4,248
Gogebic	6,865	52.68%	6,142	47.13%	25	0.19%	723	5.55%	13,032
Grand Traverse	9,102	73.47%	3,256	26.28%	30	0.24%	5,846	47.19%	12,388
Gratiot	10,319	75.71%	3,267	23.97%	44	0.32%	7,052	51.74%	13,630
Hillsdale	10,311	74.68%	3,428	24.83%	67	0.49%	6,883	49.85%	13,806
Houghton	9,620	58.26%	6,866	41.58%	25	0.15%	2,754	16.68%	16,511
Huron	10,493	76.57%	3,192	23.29%	19	0.14%	7,301	53.28%	13,704
Ingham	55,211	66.80%	27,323	33.06%	120	0.15%	27,888	33.74%	82,654
Ionia	11,001	68.76%	4,952	30.95%	46	0.29%	6,049	37.81%	15,999
Iosco	4,385	72.50%	1,660	27.45%	3	0.05%	2,725	45.05%	6,048
Iron	4,955	52.39%	4,490	47.47%	13	0.14%	465	4.92%	9,458
Isabella	8,415	72.41%	3,183	27.39%	23	0.20%	5,232	45.02%	11,621
Jackson	35,453	69.41%	15,479	30.30%	147	0.29%	19,974	39.11%	51,079
Kalamazoo	43,305	70.49%	17,808	28.99%	320	0.52%	25,497	41.50%	61,433
Kalkaska	1,443	69.11%	636	30.46%	9	0.43%	807	38.65%	2,088
Kent	94,969	65.73%	48,871	33.82%	642	0.44%	46,098	31.91%	144,482
Keweenaw	834	54.76%	689	45.24%	0	0.00%	145	9.52%	1,523
Lake	1,614	59.80%	1,083	40.13%	2	0.07%	531	19.67%	2,699
Lapeer	10,527	72.81%	3,913	27.06%	19	0.13%	6,614	45.75%	14,459
Leelanau	2,987	69.82%	1,287	30.08%	4	0.09%	1,700	39.74%	4,278
Lenawee	21,100	72.68%	7,857	27.06%	74	0.25%	13,243	45.62%	29,031
Livingston	10,315	72.62%	3,845	27.07%	45	0.32%	6,470	45.55%	14,205
Luce	1,734	72.55%	651	27.24%	5	0.21%	1,083	45.31%	2,390
Mackinac	3,279	67.99%	1,540	31.93%	4	0.08%	1,739	36.06%	4,823
Macomb	58,337	48.05%	62,816	51.73%	266	0.22%	-4,479	-3.68%	121,419
Manistee	5,313	63.74%	3,014	36.16%	9	0.11%	2,299	27.58%	8,336
Marquette	12,504	56.62%	9,543	43.21%	37	0.17%	2,961	13.41%	22,084
Mason	6,142	65.15%	3,274	34.73%	12	0.13%	2,868	30.42%	9,428
Mecosta	5,492	75.45%	1,768	24.29%	19	0.26%	3,724	51.16%	7,279
Menominee	6,137	57.05%	4,610	42.86%	10	0.09%	1,527	14.19%	10,757
Midland	13,207	74.78%	4,422	25.04%	33	0.19%	8,785	49.74%	17,662
Missaukee	2,433	76.80%	727	22.95%	8	0.25%	1,706	53.85%	3,168
Monroe	18,782	56.39%	14,414	43.28%	109	0.33%	4,368	13.11%	33,305
Montcalm	9,759	69.80%	4,189	29.96%	33	0.24%	5,570	39.84%	13,981
Montmorency	1,385	69.39%	608	30.46%	3	0.15%	777	38.93%	1,996
Muskegon	30,395	54.04%	25,679	45.65%	172	0.31%	4,716	8.39%	56,246
Newaygo	7,088	71.48%	2,808	28.32%	20	0.20%	4,280	43.16%	9,916
Oakland	152,990	60.37%	99,901	39.42%	527	0.21%	53,089	20.95%	253,418
Oceana	4,479	70.29%	1,868	29.32%	25	0.39%	2,611	40.97%	6,372
Ogemaw	2,931	69.18%	1,300	30.68%	6	0.14%	1,631	38.50%	4,237
Ontonagon	2,976	57.73%	2,175	42.19%	4	0.08%	801	15.54%	5,155
Osceola	4,549	78.28%	1,236	21.27%	26	0.45%	3,313	57.01%	5,811
Oscoda	1,044	78.03%	294	21.97%	0	0.00%	750	56.06%	1,338
Otsego	1,930	63.74%	1,095	36.16%	3	0.10%	835	27.58%	3,028
Ottawa	28,611	74.90%	9,459	24.76%	130	0.34%	19,152	50.14%	38,200
Presque Isle	3,058	61.43%	1,917	38.51%	3	0.06%	1,141	22.92%	4,978
Roscommon	2,674	76.20%	827	23.57%	8	0.23%	1,847	52.63%	3,509
Saginaw	43,470	62.67%	25,681	37.03%	210	0.30%	17,789	25.64%	69,361
Sanilac	11,095	78.88%	2,954	21.00%	17	0.12%	8,141	57.88%	14,066
Schoolcraft	2,453	58.73%	1,723	41.25%	1	0.02%	730	17.48%	4,177
Shiawassee	14,600	67.75%	6,873	31.89%	78	0.36%	7,727	35.86%	21,551
St. Clair	29,116	69.46%	12,753	30.42%	51	0.12%	16,363	39.04%	41,920
St. Joseph	12,328	74.11%	4,242	25.50%	64	0.38%	8,086	48.61%	16,634
Tuscola	12,052	75.63%	3,864	24.25%	19	0.12%	8,188	51.38%	15,935
Van Buren	13,291	69.72%	5,678	29.79%	94	0.49%	7,613	39.93%	19,063
Washtenaw	38,911	66.88%	19,124	32.87%	141	0.24%	19,787	34.01%	58,176
Wayne	481,783	41.96%	664,618	57.88%	1,844	0.16%	-182,835	-15.92%	1,148,245
Wexford	5,052	65.76%	2,604	33.89%	27	0.35%	2,448	31.87%	7,683
Totals	1,713,647	55.63%	1,359,898	44.15%	6,923	0.22%	353,749	11.48%	3,080,468

==== Counties that flipped from Democratic to Republican ====
- Gogebic
- Iron

==== Counties that flipped from Republican to Democratic ====
- Alger
- Macomb

== See also ==
- United States presidential elections in Michigan
