= 1944 United States presidential election in Alabama =

- November 7, 1944

Nominee	Franklin D. Roosevelt	Thomas E. Dewey
Party	Democratic	Republican
Home state	New York	New York
Running mate	Harry S. Truman	John W. Bricker
Electoral vote	11	0
Popular vote	198,918	44,540
Percentage	81.28%	18.20%
County results
Roosevelt
50–60%
60–70%
70–80%
80–90%
90–100%
Dewey
60–70%
President before election
Franklin D. Roosevelt
Democratic
Elected President
Franklin D. Roosevelt
Democratic

The 1944 United States presidential election in Alabama took place on November 7, 1944, as part of the 1944 United States presidential election. Alabama voters chose eleven representatives, or electors, to the Electoral College, who voted for president and vice president.

In Alabama, voters voted for electors individually instead of as a slate, as in the other states. Since the 1890s, Alabama had been effectively a one-party state ruled by the Democratic Party. Disenfranchisement of almost all African-Americans and a large proportion of poor whites via poll taxes, literacy tests and informal harassment had essentially eliminated opposition parties outside of Unionist Winston County and a few nearby northern hill counties that had been Populist strongholds. The only competitive statewide elections became Democratic Party primaries limited by law to white voters until the landmark court case of Smith v. Allwright, following which Alabama introduced the Boswell Amendment — ruled unconstitutional in Davis v. Schnell in 1949, although substantial increases in black voter registration would not occur until after the late 1960s Voting Rights Act.

Unlike other Deep South states, soon after black disenfranchisement Alabama's remaining white Republicans made rapid efforts to expel blacks from the state Republican Party, and under Oscar D. Street, who ironically was appointed state party boss as part of the pro-Taft “black and tan” faction in 1912, the state GOP would permanently turn “lily-white”, with the last black delegates at any Republican National Convention serving in 1920. With two exceptions the Republicans were unable to gain from their hard lily-white policy. The first was when they exceeded forty percent in the 1920 House of Representatives races for the 4th, 7th and 10th congressional districts, and the second was the 1928 presidential election when Senator James Thomas Heflin embarked on a nationwide speaking tour, partially funded by the Ku Klux Klan, against Roman Catholic Democratic nominee Al Smith and supported Republican Herbert Hoover, who went on to lose the state by only seven thousand votes.

By 1940, there was significant opposition amongst Alabama's planter and industrial elite to the New Deal, and there were already attempts to organize the “independent elector” movements that would proliferate after Harry S. Truman’s civil rights proposals, whilst other “big mules” already supported voting Republican for President. However, the hatred of the Republican label, despite six election cycles as a party exclusive of blacks, prevented such a revolt amongst the actual electorate.

Alabama was ultimately won in a landslide by FDR with 81.28 percent of the popular vote, against Dewey with 18.20 percent of the popular vote, a margin of 63.08 percent. Third-party candidates only managed to pick up 0.53 percent of the vote.

== Campaign ==
No campaigning was done by either incumbent Democratic President Franklin D. Roosevelt and new running mate Missouri Senator Harry S. Truman, nor by Republican nominees Governor Thomas E. Dewey–New York and Governor John W. Bricker. Polls were not taken until late October, when a Gallup poll showed Roosevelt as having 77 percent of the vote. This increased slightly to 78 percent of the two-party vote on the day before the poll.

== Results ==
1944 United States presidential election in Alabama
Party	Candidate	Votes	%
Democratic	Franklin D. Roosevelt (inc.)	198,918	81.28%
Republican	Thomas E. Dewey	44,540	18.20%
Prohibition	Claude A. Watson	1,095	0.45%
Socialist	Norman Thomas	190	0.08%
Total votes		244,743	100.00%

=== Results by individual elector ===
General election results
Party	Pledged to	Elector	Votes
Democratic Party	Franklin D. Roosevelt	W. F. Covington Jr.	198,918
Democratic Party	Franklin D. Roosevelt	John D. McQueen	198,917
Democratic Party	Franklin D. Roosevelt	Forrest Castleberry	198,908
Democratic Party	Franklin D. Roosevelt	Otis R. Burton	198,907
Democratic Party	Franklin D. Roosevelt	John E. Adams	198,904
Democratic Party	Franklin D. Roosevelt	Ben Bloodworth	198,894
Democratic Party	Franklin D. Roosevelt	Fournier J. Gale	198,888
Democratic Party	Franklin D. Roosevelt	Thomas H. Maxwell	198,880
Democratic Party	Franklin D. Roosevelt	Gessner T. McCorvey	198,871
Democratic Party	Franklin D. Roosevelt	Walter F. Miller	198,868
Democratic Party	Franklin D. Roosevelt	W. O. Pope	197,872
Republican Party	Thomas E. Dewey	William M. Russell	44,540
Republican Party	Thomas E. Dewey	C. R. Stone	44,540
Republican Party	Thomas E. Dewey	C. S. Prescott	44,513
Republican Party	Thomas E. Dewey	J. Dewey Rockett	44,509
Republican Party	Thomas E. Dewey	Jack E. Paterson	44,496
Republican Party	Thomas E. Dewey	E. L. Harvell	44,478
Republican Party	Thomas E. Dewey	Lyman Ward	44,467
Republican Party	Thomas E. Dewey	H. A. Jackson	44,447
Republican Party	Thomas E. Dewey	Pope M. Long	44,446
Republican Party	Thomas E. Dewey	R. M. Sims	44,433
Republican Party	Thomas E. Dewey	Aaron G. Weaver	44,306
Prohibition Party	Claude A. Watson	A. J. Dailey	1,095
Prohibition Party	Claude A. Watson	James C. Mauldin	1,082
Prohibition Party	Claude A. Watson	Emmett Williams	1,081
Prohibition Party	Claude A. Watson	A. W. Stone	1,071
Prohibition Party	Claude A. Watson	C. H. McAdory	1,069
Prohibition Party	Claude A. Watson	John C. Orr	1,068
Prohibition Party	Claude A. Watson	Glenn V. Tingley	1,064
Prohibition Party	Claude A. Watson	J. B. Lockhart	1,058
Prohibition Party	Claude A. Watson	Mary A. Bebout	1,054
Prohibition Party	Claude A. Watson	W. E. Braden	1,054
Prohibition Party	Claude A. Watson	Eunice Sisson	1,050
Socialist Party of America	Norman Thomas	Minnie C. Adams	190
Socialist Party of America	Norman Thomas	Robert S. Burgess Jr.	182
Socialist Party of America	Norman Thomas	Frederic Roper	176
Socialist Party of America	Norman Thomas	D. R. Calloway	166
Socialist Party of America	Norman Thomas	F. M. Buttram	162
Total votes			244,743

=== Results by county ===
County	Franklin D. Roosevelt Democratic		Thomas E. Dewey Republican		Claude A. Watson Prohibition		Norman Thomas Socialist		Margin		Total votes cast
County	#	%	#	%	#	%	#	%	#	%	Total votes cast
Autauga	1,242	91.06%	117	8.58%	5	0.37%	0	0.00%	1,125	82.48%	1,364
Baldwin	2,002	73.41%	695	25.49%	22	0.81%	8	0.29%	1,308	47.95%	2,727
Barbour	2,237	94.91%	67	2.84%	53	2.25%	0	0.00%	2,170	92.07%	2,357
Bibb	1,287	83.25%	244	15.78%	10	0.65%	2	0.13%	1,043	67.60%	1,546
Blount	2,134	67.85%	998	31.73%	10	0.32%	1	0.03%	1,135	36.12%	3,145
Bullock	1,056	97.78%	24	2.22%	0	0.00%	0	0.00%	1,032	95.56%	1,080
Butler	1,915	95.75%	80	4.00%	5	0.25%	0	0.00%	1,835	91.75%	2,000
Calhoun	4,308	85.65%	694	13.80%	26	0.52%	2	0.04%	3,614	71.85%	5,030
Chambers	3,458	94.43%	194	5.30%	9	0.25%	0	0.00%	3,264	89.16%	3,662
Cherokee	1,774	80.64%	408	18.55%	17	0.77%	1	0.05%	1,366	62.09%	2,200
Chilton	1,984	58.77%	1,385	41.02%	6	0.18%	1	0.03%	599	17.74%	3,376
Choctaw	1,243	93.32%	86	6.46%	3	0.23%	0	0.00%	1,158	86.87%	1,332
Clarke	2,263	93.98%	142	5.90%	3	0.12%	0	0.00%	2,121	88.08%	2,408
Clay	1,535	67.03%	741	32.36%	13	0.57%	1	0.04%	794	34.67%	2,290
Cleburne	948	65.02%	504	34.57%	6	0.41%	0	0.00%	443	30.36%	1,458
Coffee	2,846	96.02%	115	3.88%	3	0.10%	0	0.00%	2,731	92.14%	2,964
Colbert	3,386	87.07%	496	12.75%	6	0.15%	2	0.05%	2,890	74.29%	3,889
Conecuh	1,498	91.34%	127	7.74%	9	0.55%	6	0.37%	1,371	83.60%	1,640
Coosa	1,079	72.86%	394	26.60%	5	0.34%	3	0.20%	685	46.25%	1,481
Covington	2,972	91.98%	256	7.92%	2	0.06%	1	0.03%	2,716	84.06%	3,231
Crenshaw	1,980	94.06%	118	5.61%	6	0.29%	0	0.00%	1,862	88.50%	2,105
Cullman	3,898	63.43%	2,202	35.83%	41	0.67%	4	0.07%	1,696	27.60%	6,145
Dale	2,094	85.57%	325	13.28%	8	0.33%	1	0.04%	1,769	72.86%	2,447
Dallas	2,883	94.74%	149	4.90%	5	0.16%	5	0.16%	2,735	89.88%	3,043
DeKalb	4,366	62.35%	2,627	37.52%	9	0.13%	0	0.00%	1,739	24.84%	7,002
Elmore	3,108	94.32%	184	5.58%	3	0.09%	0	0.00%	2,924	88.74%	3,295
Escambia	2,077	88.20%	266	11.30%	12	0.51%	0	0.00%	1,811	76.90%	2,355
Etowah	5,895	78.38%	1,525	20.28%	89	1.18%	12	0.16%	4,370	58.10%	7,521
Fayette	1,648	64.10%	913	35.51%	10	0.39%	0	0.00%	735	28.59%	2,571
Franklin	2,709	59.30%	1,853	40.56%	6	0.13%	0	0.00%	856	18.74%	4,568
Geneva	2,004	83.36%	385	16.01%	15	0.62%	0	0.00%	1,619	67.35%	2,404
Greene	676	93.63%	45	6.23%	1	0.14%	0	0.00%	631	87.40%	722
Hale	1,265	97.46%	33	2.54%	0	0.00%	0	0.00%	1,232	94.92%	1,298
Henry	1,635	97.15%	46	2.73%	2	0.12%	0	0.00%	1,589	94.41%	1,683
Houston	3,349	91.80%	282	7.73%	16	0.44%	1	0.03%	3,067	84.07%	3,648
Jackson	2,967	74.18%	1,026	25.65%	6	0.15%	1	0.03%	1,941	48.53%	4,000
Jefferson	31,101	80.40%	7,409	19.15%	157	0.41%	17	0.04%	23,692	61.24%	38,684
Lamar	2,025	86.10%	310	13.18%	16	0.68%	1	0.04%	1,715	72.92%	2,352
Lauderdale	4,001	86.77%	590	12.80%	19	0.41%	1	0.02%	3,411	73.98%	4,611
Lawrence	1,893	76.86%	565	22.94%	5	0.20%	0	0.00%	1,328	53.92%	2,463
Lee	2,011	93.49%	134	6.23%	5	0.23%	1	0.05%	1,878	87.27%	2,151
Limestone	2,605	94.93%	129	4.70%	10	0.36%	0	0.00%	2,476	90.23%	2,744
Lowndes	802	97.92%	16	1.95%	1	0.12%	0	0.00%	786	95.97%	819
Macon	1,032	92.56%	82	7.35%	1	0.09%	0	0.00%	951	85.37%	1,115
Madison	4,951	91.33%	455	8.39%	11	0.20%	4	0.07%	4,496	82.94%	5,421
Marengo	1,746	94.69%	89	4.83%	7	0.38%	2	0.11%	1,657	89.86%	1,844
Marion	1,866	59.48%	1,260	40.17%	10	0.32%	0	0.00%	607	19.36%	3,137
Marshall	3,356	73.58%	1,200	26.31%	5	0.11%	0	0.00%	2,156	47.27%	4,561
Mobile	9,439	75.98%	2,867	23.08%	86	0.69%	25	0.20%	6,570	52.92%	12,423
Monroe	1,991	97.55%	46	2.25%	4	0.20%	0	0.00%	1,945	95.30%	2,041
Montgomery	9,143	95.62%	381	3.98%	32	0.33%	9	0.09%	8,748	91.57%	9,562
Morgan	4,124	85.24%	664	13.72%	49	1.01%	0	0.00%	3,461	71.57%	4,838
Perry	1,004	95.35%	47	4.46%	2	0.19%	0	0.00%	957	90.88%	1,053
Pickens	1,482	87.23%	209	12.30%	8	0.47%	0	0.00%	1,273	74.93%	1,699
Pike	2,328	93.87%	90	3.63%	31	1.25%	30	1.21%	2,238	90.28%	2,480
Randolph	1,785	71.06%	702	27.95%	25	1.00%	0	0.00%	1,083	43.11%	2,512
Russell	2,109	94.66%	115	5.16%	4	0.18%	0	0.00%	1,994	89.50%	2,228
Shelby	1,955	67.11%	945	32.44%	8	0.27%	2	0.07%	1,009	34.66%	2,913
St. Clair	1,819	61.66%	1,117	37.86%	13	0.44%	1	0.03%	702	23.80%	2,950
Sumter	1,075	95.05%	53	4.69%	3	0.27%	0	0.00%	1,022	90.36%	1,131
Talladega	3,102	81.50%	675	17.74%	25	0.66%	2	0.05%	2,428	63.84%	3,806
Tallapoosa	3,326	95.88%	136	3.92%	7	0.20%	0	0.00%	3,190	91.96%	3,469
Tuscaloosa	4,939	88.62%	584	10.48%	20	0.36%	4	0.07%	4,355	78.51%	5,573
Walker	4,619	66.87%	2,241	32.45%	32	0.46%	12	0.17%	2,379	34.46%	6,907
Washington	1,447	92.28%	115	7.33%	6	0.38%	0	0.00%	1,332	84.95%	1,568
Wilcox	1,209	97.42%	30	2.42%	2	0.16%	0	0.00%	1,179	95.00%	1,241
Winston	912	37.07%	1,538	62.52%	10	0.41%	0	0.00%	-626	-25.45%	2,460
Totals	198,918	81.28%	44,540	18.20%	1,095	0.45%	190	0.08%	154,378	63.08%	244,743

== See also ==
- United States presidential elections in Alabama
