= Andrew N. Johnson =

American politician (1876–1959)

Andrew Nathan Johnson (1876–1959) was a Methodist minister. He was born in Jackson County, Kentucky and attended Asbury College in Wilmore.

An ardent advocate for prohibition, in 1944 Johnson was the Prohibition Party's nominee for Vice-President of the United States. The Party, meeting for its National convention in Indianapolis November 1943 originally named Floyd C. Carrier as its vice presidential candidate. At the time of the nomination, Carrier was serving as general secretary for the American Temperance Society. He subsequently dropped out of the campaign because of health problems. Johnson was added by the party's executive committee to replace him. Johnson and Claude Watson, the party's presidential nominee, actively campaigned throughout the election cycle and were on the ballot in 27 states for the 1944 general election. They received a total of 74,758 votes.
