= 1943 Prohibition National Convention =

- 1944 presidential election

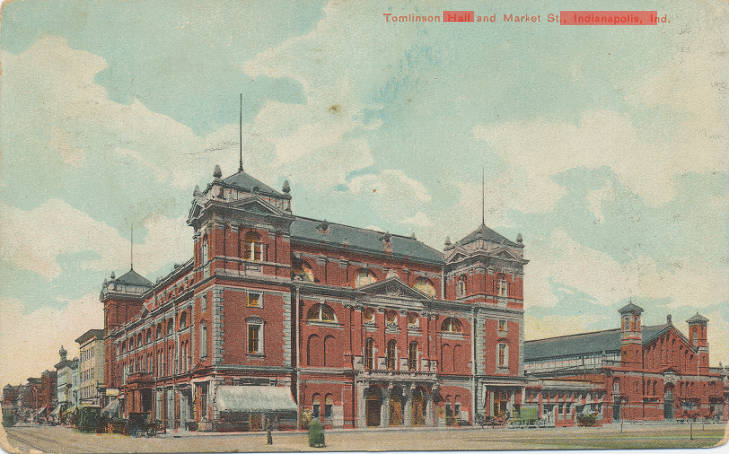
- Postcard of Tomlinson Hall, the convention venue

Convention
- Date(s): November 9, 1943 (rally); November 10–13, 1943 (convention)
- City: Indianapolis, Indiana
- Venue: Tomlinson Hall
- Keynote speaker: D. Leigh Colvin of New York

Candidates
- Presidential nominee: Claude A. Watson of California
- Vice-presidential nominee: Floyd C. Carrier of Maryland later withdrew (Note: replaced on ticket by Andrew N. Johnson)
- Ballots: 1

The 1943 Prohibition National Convention was held November 10–13, 1943, at Tomlinson Hall in Indianapolis, Indiana. It nominated Claude A. Watson of California for president, and Floyd C. Carrier of Maryland for vice president.

== Logistics ==
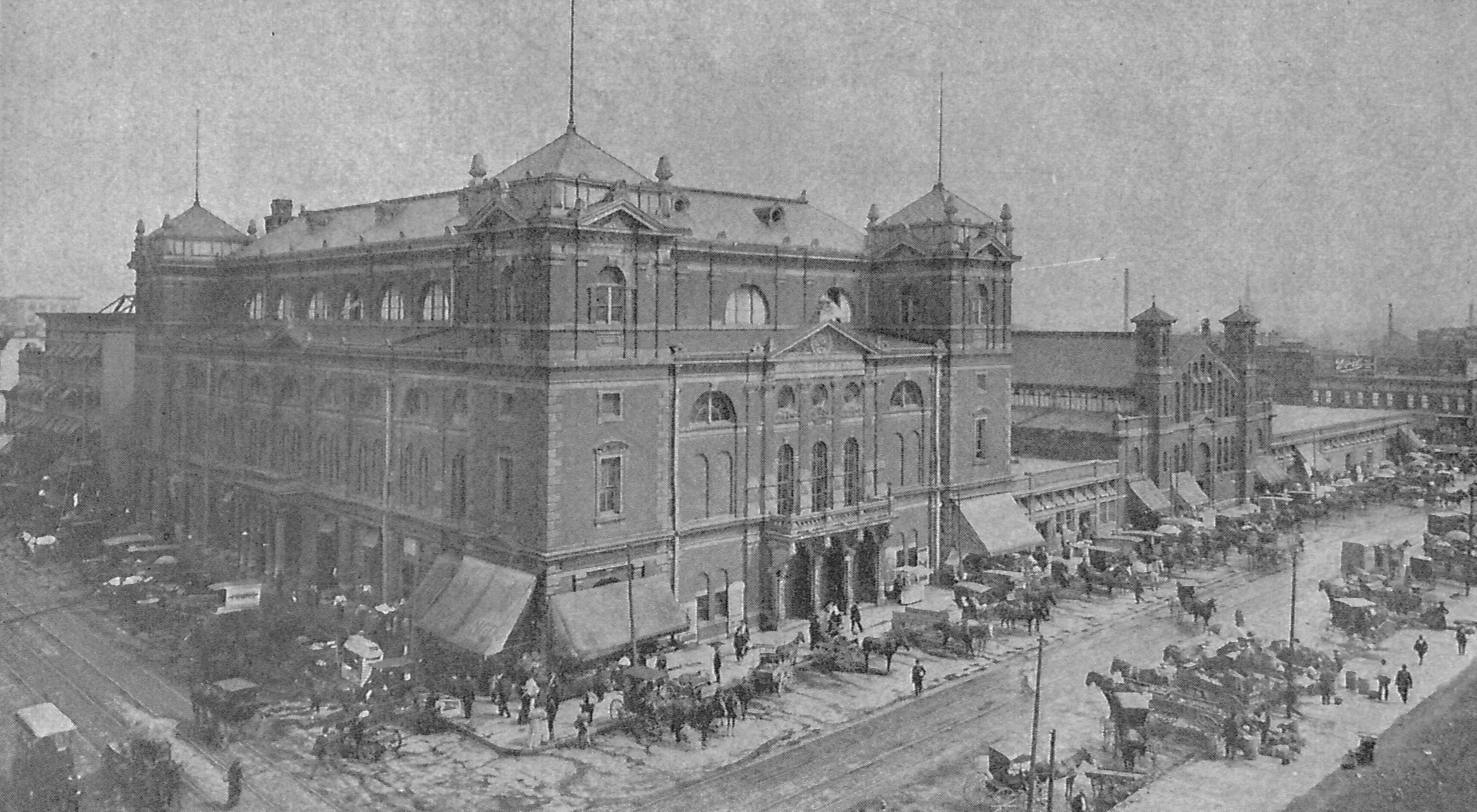
Tomlinson Hall, venue of both the convention and preceding rally (photographed in 1909)

The convention was held at Tomlinson Hall in Indianapolis, Indiana, November 10–13, 1943. It was the 75th annual meeting of the Prohibition Party, and its nineteen national (presidential nominating) convention. It marked the first time that the party held its nominating convention in the calendar year prior to the election, something it would regularly do afterwards.

Tomilnson hall had previously been the venue of the party's presidential conventions in 1888 and 1904. It also was the location of the 1912 Convention of the Socialist Party of America.

The state of Indiana was a regular location for the Prohibition Party's conventions. Indianapolis had been the site of the 1888, 1904, and 1932 conventions; and was soon after the site of its 1951 convention. Winona Lake, Indiana was the site of the party's convention in 1947 and 1959, and Milford (in Kosciusko County, Indiana) was the site of its convention in 1955.

The convention was expected to feature approximately 225 delegates from 32 states and the District of Columbia.

The convention was organized in conjunction with the Indiana state party, which held its state office nominating convention directly ahead of the start to the 3-day national convention. The state party held its meeting at the Central YMCA Building in Indianapolis.

=== Temporary officers ===
The temporary officers appointed for the convention were:

- D. Leigh Colvin of New York, chairman
- James A. W. Killip of Pennsylvania, secretary
- Ralph C. March of Illinois, first assistant secretary
- E. Harold Munn of Michigan, second assistant secretary
- Virgil C. Finnil of Indiana, sergeant at arms

Additionally, Enoch A. Holtwick served as presiding officer during the convention.

== Presidential nomination ==
The convention selected its nominees for the 1944 United States presidential election on the final evening of the convention. The party claimed it would be running its "most extensive and most thorough" campaign In 1943. It nominated Claude A. Watson of California for president. Watson was a Los Angeles-based lawyer. He defeated radio personality and reverend Samuel N. Morris of Texas. Additionally, Earl R. Chalfant put himself forward as a candidate for the nomination.

Heading into the convention, Watson and Morris were the most widely discussed prospects for the nomination, with Prohibitionist former congressman Charles Hiram Randall of California also speculated as a possible nominee. The previous nominee of the party, Roger Babson, had ruled out another run; declaring that he would decline to accept if nominated.

Presidential nomination vote

- Watson: 131
- Morris: 31
- Chalfant: 0

== Vice presidential nomination ==
After losing the presidential nomination, Morris refused to be nominated for vice president. The convention ultimately nominated Floyd C. Carrier of Washington (the president of the American Temperance Society) for vice president. His only opponent for the nomination was Andrew N. Johnson of Kentucky, the unsuccessful nominee of the party in the 1943 Kentucky gubernatorial election held weeks earlier.

Carrier later dropped off the ticket due to health problems, and Johnson was substituted as vice presidential nominee by a vote of the party's executive committee.

Vice presidential nomination vote

- Carrier: 130.5
- Johnson: 17.5

== Rally ==
On the evening prior to the first session of the convention, local ministers organized a public rally. Congressman Joseph R. Bryson of South Carolina (a Democrat) was the headlining speaker. At the time, he was proposing legislation to instate prohibition temporarily during the American effort in World War II and the future demobilization period. The rally was also held at Tomlinson Hall.

== Speakers at convention ==
D. Leigh Colvin delivered the keynote address at the opening session. His speech focused on his view that the party needed to build itself upon its support for prohibition and connected moral matters, encouraging the Prohibition Party to develop as, "a part not dependent upon votes of the wets (Note: opponents of alcohol prohibition are colloquially known as "wets", while proponents are known as "drys") and the underworld".

Other speakers included D. Leigh Colvin (the 1936 presidential nominee of the party) and Virgil G. Hinshaw (former national chairman of the party).

== Platform ==
The convention adopted a platform highly critical of President Franklin D. Roosevelt and his administration.

The platform advocated for presidential term limits to be imposed of a single six-year term, changing the law from presidents serving four-year terms without formally imposed term limits.

== Party officer elections ==
Edward E. Blake of Illinois was re-elected as party chairman. F. W. Louth of Indiana was re-elected as vice chairman. James A. W. Killip of Pennsylvania was re-elected as New York. Charles L. Hill of Wisconsin was re-elected as treasurer.

== Rejected proposal to rename party ==
A proposal to rename the party, spearheaded by William F. Varney. It was defeated after lengthy debate. The proposal to rename the party did not put forth a specific proposal for a new name. The grouping of delegates leading opposition to the proposal was led by Louth.
