= B. R. Lakin =

American Baptist preacher

Bascom Ray Lakin (January 5, 1901 – March 15, 1984) was an American Baptist preacher and evangelist.

== Biography ==
B. R. Lakin was born on a farm near Fort Gay, West Virginia, on the Kentucky border. His mother had prayed for a "preacher man" and had dedicated him to God even before he was born. Lakin attended a one-room schoolhouse in West Virginia through the 4th grade. Later, when he realized the need for more education, he attended Moody Bible Institute while pastoring several churches. Eventually Bob Jones University and (the now defunct) Kletzing College bestowed honorary doctorates.

Lakin was converted to Christianity during a revival meeting when he was sixteen and baptized in Big Hurricane Creek. Within a week he had preached his first sermon. During the 1920s he served as circuit-riding preacher, riding a mule from church to church through the mountains and foothills of rural West Virginia and Kentucky. In 1939, he was called to assist E. Howard Cadle (1884-1942) at the Cadle Tabernacle in Indianapolis, Indiana, a church that seated ten thousand with an additional fourteen hundred seats for the choir. Cadle conducted a daily radio program, “Nation’s Family Prayer Period," on the 50,000-watt clear channel WLW in Cincinnati, and the program became the most listened to religious broadcast during the 1930s. Upon Cadle's death in 1942, Lakin became senior pastor and continued the broadcast. Although Lakin did not have Cadle's charisma, he was heard in thousands of homes across the United States and thereby became a nationally known Gospel preacher.

In 1952, Lakin began a thirty-year evangelistic ministry, preaching in some of the largest evangelical churches in country. He is said to have seen a hundred thousand conversions to Christ through his ministry. Even shortly before his death in 1984, at age 83, Lakin still traveled extensively and was one of the most sought after fundamentalist preachers in America. Lakin's sermons were a combination of wit, Bible teaching, and a strong Gospel appeal. For instance, his advice about dealing with enemies was "Love them, pray for them, and outlive them."

Lakin and his wife, Violet, had only one child, a son who was killed at an early age in an automobile accident. They "adopted" the young Jerry Falwell, and Lakin mentored and "poured himself" into Falwell's Lynchburg ministry. The department of religion at Falwell's Liberty University is named in honor of Lakin, who is interred on the campus.
