= Prohibition Party =

Political party in the United States

- Chairperson: Zack Kusnir
- Founded: September 1, 1869; 157 years ago
- Ideology: Temperance; Christian democracy Syncretic politics
- Political position: Fiscal: Center-left; Social: Center-right
- Colors: Red, white and blue (national colors)
- Seats in the Senate: 0 / 100
- Seats in the House: 0 / 435
- Governorships: 0 / 50
- State Upper Houses: 0 / 1,921
- State Lower Houses: 0 / 5,411

Website
- www.prohibitionparty.org

The Prohibition Party (PRO) is a political party in the United States known for its historic opposition to the sale or consumption of alcoholic beverages and as an integral part of the temperance movement. It is the oldest existing third party in the United States and the third-longest active party.

Although never one of the leading parties in the United States, it was once an important force in the Third Party System during the late 19th and early 20th centuries. The organization declined following the enactment of Prohibition in the United States but saw a rise in vote totals following the repeal of the Eighteenth Amendment in 1933. However, following World War II it declined again, with 1948 being the last time its presidential candidate received over 100,000 votes and 1976 being the last time the party received over 10,000 votes.

The party's platform has changed over its existence. Its platforms throughout the 19th century supported progressive and populist positions including women's suffrage, equal racial and gender rights, bimetallism, equal pay, and an income tax. The platform of the party today is progressive on economic issues in that it supports Social Security and free education, but is conservative on social issues, such as supporting temperance and advocating for a consistent life ethic. The party also advocates for environmental stewardship.

== History ==
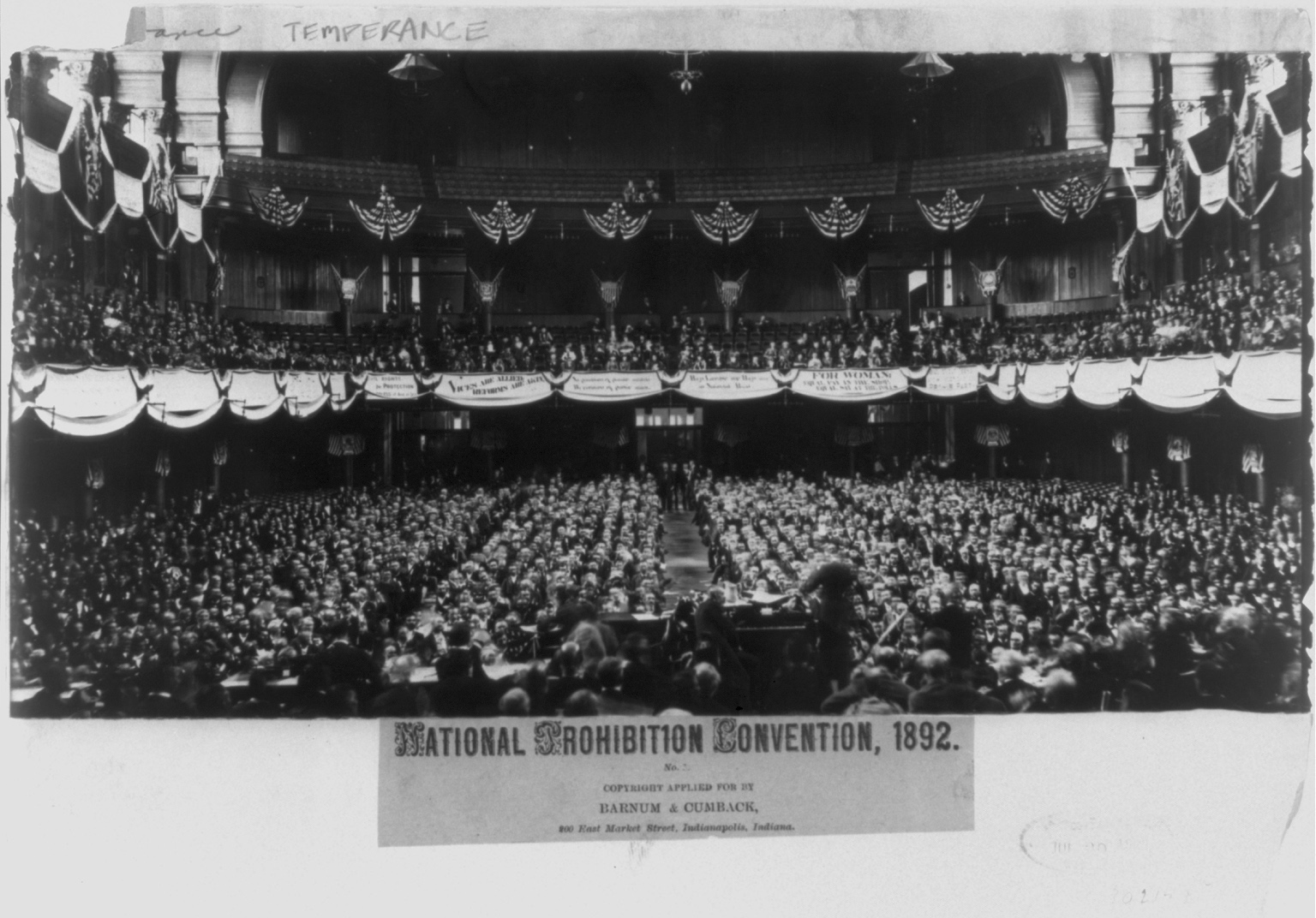
National Prohibition Convention, Cincinnati, Ohio, 1892

=== Foundation ===
In 1868 and 1869, branches of the International Organisation of Good Templars, a global temperance organization, passed resolutions supporting the creation of a political party in favor of alcoholic prohibition. From July 29 to 30, 1868, the sixth National Temperance Convention was held in Cleveland, Ohio, and passed a resolution supporting temperance advocates to enter politics. On May 25, 1869, the Good Templars branch in Oswego, New York, called a meeting to prepare for the creation of a political party in favor of prohibition. Jonathan H. Orne was chosen as chairman and Julius A. Spencer as secretary of the meeting and a committee consisting of John Russell, Daniel Wilkins, Julius A. Spencer, John N. Stearns, and James Black was created to organize a national party.

On September 1, 1869, almost five hundred delegates from twenty states and Washington, D.C., met at Farwell Hall in Chicago and John Russell was selected to serve as the temporary chairman and James Black as president of the convention. The party was the first to accept women as members and gave those who attended full delegate rights. Former anti-slavery activist Gerrit Smith, who had served in the House of Representatives from 1853 to 1854 and had run for president in 1848, 1856, and 1860 with the Liberty Party nomination, served as a delegate from New York and gave a speech at the convention. The organization was referred to as either the National Prohibition Party or the Prohibition Reform Party.

=== Early ===
On December 9, 1871, a national convention was called for February 22, 1872, to nominate a presidential and vice presidential candidate. Chairman Simeon B. Chase, U.S. Chief Justice Salmon P. Chase, Gerrit Smith, Mayor Neal Dow (a former mayor of Portland, Maine), and John Russell were proposed as presidential nominees while Henry Fish, James Black, John Blackman, Secretary Gideon T. Stewart, Julius A. Spencer, and Stephen B. Ransom were proposed for the vice presidential nomination. Black and Russell were given the presidential and vice presidential nominations. The first platform of the organization included support for alcoholic prohibition, the direct election of Senators, bimetallic currency (based on silver as well as gold), low tariffs, universal suffrage for both men and women of all races, and increased foreign immigration.

In 1876, the organization's name was changed to the National Prohibition Reform Party. However, in 1881, Frances Willard, R. W. Nelson, A. J. Jutkins, and George W. Bain formed the Home Protection Party, which was more pro-women's suffrage than the Prohibition Party, but later rejoined the party at the 1882 convention and the organization was renamed to the Prohibition Home Protection Party. However, at the 1884 national convention the organization was renamed to the National Prohibition Party.

=== Rise ===
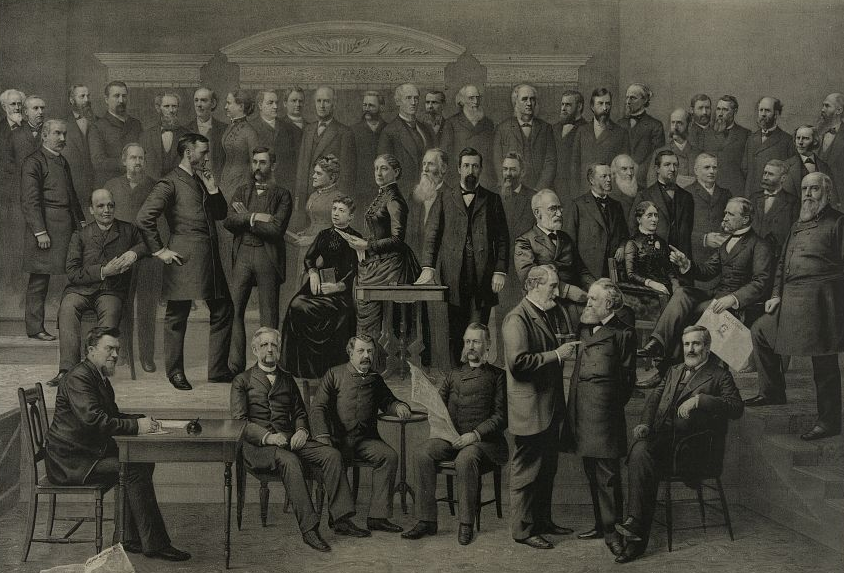
1884 National Prohibition Convention in Lafayette Hall, Pittsburgh, Pennsylvania

In 1879, Frances Willard became the president of the Woman's Christian Temperance Union and although it had remained non-partisan in the 1876 and 1880 presidential elections, Willard advocated for a resolution under which the organization would pledge its support to whichever party would support alcoholic prohibition. Willard's attempts in 1882 and 1883 were unsuccessful, but she was successful in 1884 after her opponents left to join Judith Foster's rival Non-Partisan WCTU. During the 1884 presidential election the organization sent its resolution to the Republican, Democratic, Greenback, and Prohibition parties and only the Prohibition Party accepted. At the Woman's Christian Temperance Union's 1884 national convention in St. Louis the organization voted 195 to 48 in favor of supporting the Prohibition Party and would continue to support the Prohibition Party until Willard's death in 1898.

During the 1884 election, the party nominated John St. John, the former Republican governor of Kansas, who, with the support from Willard and the WCTU, saw the party poll 147,482 votes for 1.50% of the popular vote. However, the party was accused of spoiling the election due to Grover Cleveland's margin of victory over James G. Blaine in New York being less than John's vote total there. In 1888, the party's presidential nominee, Clinton B. Fisk, was accused of being a possible spoiler candidate that would prevent Benjamin Harrison from winning, but Harrison won the election even though he lost the national popular vote.

From January to February 1892, Willard met with representatives from the Farmers' Alliance, People's Party, National Reform Party, and the remainder of the Greenback Party in Chicago and St. Louis in an attempt to create a fusion presidential ticket, but the organizations were unable to agree to a platform. The People's Party would later fuse with the Democratic Party in the 1896 presidential election.

The party suffered a schism at the 1896 Prohibition convention between the "narrow gauger" faction which supported having only an alcoholic prohibition plank in the party's platform and the "broad gauger" faction which supported the addition of free silver and women's suffrage planks. After the narrow gaugers successfully chose the presidential ticket and the party platform, the broad gaugers, led by former presidential nominee John St. John, Nebraska state chairman Charles Eugene Bentley, and suffragette Helen M. Gougar, walked out and created the breakaway National Party, nominating a rival ticket with Bentley as president and James H. Southgate as vice president. The Prohibition party ticket of Joshua Levering and Hale Johnson had the worst popular vote performance since Neal Dow's 10,364 votes in 1880, but still outperformed the National Party's 13,968 votes. Following the 1896 election most of the members of the National Party became disillusioned with that party and returned to the Prohibition Party, but those who remained reformed into the Union Reform Party and supported Seth H. Ellis and Samuel Nicholson during the 1900 presidential election, while the official Prohibition Party ticket of John G. Woolley and Henry B. Metcalf took 1.5% and third place in the national popular vote.

At the same time, the Prohibition Party's ideology broadened to include aspects of progressivism. The party contributed to the third-party discussions of the 1910s and sent Charles H. Randall to the 64th, 65th, and 66th Congresses (1915–21) as the representative of California's 9th congressional district; on April 6, 1917, Randall was one of 50 representatives who voted against U.S. entry into World War I. Democrat Sidney J. Catts of Florida, after losing a close Democratic primary, used the Prohibition line to win election as Governor of Florida in 1916; he remained a Democrat.

During the 1916 presidential election, the party attempted to give its presidential nomination to former Democratic presidential candidate William Jennings Bryan, but he declined the offer via telegram. At the national convention the presidential nomination was given to former Indiana Governor Frank Hanly, but an attempt to make his nomination unanimous was defeated by Eugene W. Chafin, who had served as the presidential nominee in 1908 and 1912, and had supported giving the nomination to former New York Governor William Sulzer. Virgil G. Hinshaw wrote to John M. Parker in an attempt to fuse the Prohibition and Progressive parties, but it failed; the Progressives did not nominate a presidential candidate and later disbanded.

On February 4, 1918, the Prohibition affiliate in California voted in favor of merging with the National Party, which was created by pro-war defectors from the Socialist Party of America in 1917.

WCTU flag from the beginning of the 20th century

=== Decline ===
On January 16, 1919, the Eighteenth Amendment, which prohibited "intoxicating liquors" in the United States, was ratified by the requisite number of states. Although it was suggested that the organization should be disbanded due to national alcoholic prohibition being achieved, the committee leaders changed the focus of the organization to support the enforcement of prohibition. In 1921, the organization petitioned for any non-citizens who violated the Eighteenth Amendment to be deported and for citizen violators to lose their right to vote. At the 1924 national convention the party approved a platform with only two planks, namely, supporting religion in public schools and the assimilation of immigrants.

During the 1928 presidential election, some members of the party, including Chairman D. Leigh Colvin and former presidential nominee Herman P. Faris, considered endorsing Republican Herbert Hoover rather than running a Prohibition candidate and risk allowing Al Smith, who supported ending prohibition, to be elected. However, the party chose to nominate William F. Varney due to its feeling that Hoover was not strict enough on prohibition, although the affiliate in California gave Hoover an additional ballot line and in Pennsylvania the affiliate did not file presidential electors. However, the party became critical of Hoover after his victory, and during the 1932 presidential election D. Leigh Colvin stated that "The Republican wet plank, supporting the repeal of Prohibition, means that Mr. Hoover is the most conspicuous turncoat since Benedict Arnold." Hoover lost the election, but national prohibition was repealed in 1933, with the 21st Amendment during the Roosevelt administration.

=== Post-World War II ===
In 1950, when the party was $5,000 in debt, Gerald Overholt was selected to be the party's chairman. During the 1952 presidential election, Overholt and Stuart Hamblen, the presidential nominee, spent $70,000 and the party's debt was increased to $20,000. During the 1954 elections, the affiliates in Pennsylvania, Massachusetts, Indiana, and Michigan lost their ballot access although the party remained successful in Kansas, where the Prohibition sheriff of Jewell County was reelected, and in California, where the attorney general nominee received over 200,000 votes.

In 1977, the party changed its name to the National Statesman Party, but Time magazine suggested that it was "doubtful" that the name change would "hoist the party out of the category of political oddity" and it changed its name back to the Prohibition Party in 1980.

The Prohibition Party experienced a schism in 2003, as the party's prior presidential candidate, Earl Dodge, incorporated a rival party called the National Prohibition Party in Colorado. An opposing faction nominated Gene C. Amondson for president and filed under the Prohibition banner in Louisiana. Dodge ran under the name of the historic Prohibition Party in Colorado, while the Concerns of People Party allowed Amondson to run on its line against Dodge. Amondson received 1,944 votes, nationwide, while Dodge garnered 140.

States of residence of every Prohibition presidential nominee

Prohibition ballot access during the 2016 presidential election

One key area of disagreement between the factions was over who should control payments from a trust fund dedicated to the Prohibition Party by George Pennock in 1930. The fund pays approximately $8,000 per year, and during the schism these funds were divided between the factions. Dodge died in 2007, allowing the dispute over the Pennock funds to finally be resolved in 2014. The party is reported as having only "three dozen fee-paying members".

In 2015, the party rejoined the board of the Coalition for Free and Open Elections and became a qualified political party in Mississippi. In the 2016 election, the party nominated James Hedges and qualified for the ballot in three states, Arkansas, Colorado, and Mississippi; he earned 5,514 votes becoming the most successful Prohibition presidential candidate since 1988.

The party met via telephone conference in November 2018 to nominate its 2020 presidential ticket. Bill Bayes of Mississippi, the vice presidential nominee during the 2016 presidential election, was given the nomination on the first ballot over Adam Seaman and Phil Collins. C.L. Gammon of Tennessee was given the vice presidential nomination without opposition. Bayes resigned as the nominee, accusing some party activists of sabotaging his run because they opposed his views. Another telephone conference call was held, during which Gammon was given the presidential nomination and Collins was given the vice presidential nomination. However, Gammon withdrew from the nomination in August 2019 due to health problems, and another telephone conference was held that selected Collins for the presidential nomination and Billy Joe Parker for the vice presidential nomination. In 2024, the party nominated businessman Michael Wood for President, and John Pietrowski for Vice President.

Prohibition ballot access during the 2024 presidential election, as of July 2024

== Electoral history ==
=== Presidential campaigns ===
The Prohibition Party has nominated a candidate for president in every election since 1872; thus, it is the longest-lived American political party after the Democrats and Republicans.

Prohibition Party National Conventions and Campaigns
Year	Convention			Presidential nominee	Vice-Presidential nominee	Votes	Votes %
Year	No.	Convention Site & City	Dates	Presidential nominee	Vice-Presidential nominee	Votes	Votes %
1872	1st	Comstock's Opera House, Columbus, Ohio	February 22, 1872	James Black (Pennsylvania)	John Russell (Michigan)	5,607	0.1
1876	2nd	Halle's Hall, Cleveland, Ohio	May 17, 1876	Green Clay Smith (Kentucky)	Gideon T. Stewart (Ohio)	6,945	0.08
1880	3rd	Halle's Hall, Cleveland, Ohio	June 17, 1880	Neal Dow (Maine)	Henry Adams Thompson (Ohio)	10,364	0.11
1884	4th	Lafayette Hall, Pittsburgh, Pennsylvania	July 23–24, 1884	John P. St. John (Kansas)	William Daniel (Maryland)	147,482	1.50
1888	5th	Tomlinson Hall, Indianapolis, Indiana	May 30–31, 1888	Clinton B. Fisk (New Jersey)	John A. Brooks (Missouri)	249,819	2.20
1892	6th	Music Hall, Cincinnati, Ohio	June 29–30, 1892	John Bidwell (California)	James B. Cranfill (Texas)	270,879	2.24
1896	7th	Exposition Hall, Pittsburgh	May 27–28, 1896	Joshua Levering (Maryland)	Hale Johnson (Illinois)	131,312	0.94
1896	[7th]	Pittsburgh	May 28, 1896	Charles Eugene Bentley (Nebraska)	James H. Southgate (N. Car.)	13,968	0.10
1900	8th	First Regiment Armory, Chicago, Illinois	June 27–28, 1900	John G. Woolley (Illinois)	Henry B. Metcalf (Rhode Island)	210,864	1.51
1900	[8th]			Seth H. Ellis (Ohio)	Samuel T. Nicholson	5,696	0.04
1904	9th	Tomlinson Hall, Indianapolis	June 29 to July 1, 1904	Silas C. Swallow (Pennsylvania)	George W. Carroll (Texas)	259,102	1.92
1908	10th	Memorial Hall, Columbus	July 15–16, 1908	Eugene W. Chafin (Illinois/Arizona) (Note: lived in Illinois during 1908 nomination, Arizona during 1912 nomination)	Aaron S. Watkins (Ohio)	254,087	1.71
1912	11th	Steel Pier, Atlantic City, New Jersey	July 10–12, 1912	Eugene W. Chafin (Illinois/Arizona)	Aaron S. Watkins (Ohio)	208,156	1.38
1916	12th	Municipal Auditorium, St. Paul, Minnesota	July 19–21, 1916	J. Frank Hanly (Indiana)	Rev. Dr. Ira Landrith (Tennessee)	221,302	1.19
1920	13th	City Auditorium, Lincoln, Nebraska	July 21–22, 1920	Aaron S. Watkins (Ohio)	D. Leigh Colvin (New York)	188,787	0.71
1924	14th	Memorial Hall, Columbus	June 4–6, 1924	Herman P. Faris (Missouri)	Marie C. Brehm (California)	55,951	0.19
1928	15th	La Salle Hotel, Chicago	July 10–12, 1928	William F. Varney (New York)	James A. Edgerton	20,101	0.05
1928	[15th]	(California ticket)		Herbert Hoover (California)	Charles Curtis (Kansas)	14,394	
1932	16th	Cadle Tabernacle, Indianapolis	July 5–7, 1932	William D. Upshaw (Georgia)	Frank S. Regan (Illinois)	81,905	0.21
1936	17th	State Armory Building, Niagara Falls, New York	May 5–7, 1936	D. Leigh Colvin (New York)	Alvin York (Tennessee) (declined); Claude A. Watson (California)	37,659	0.08
1940	18th	La Salle Hotel, Chicago	May 8–10, 1940	Roger W. Babson (Mass.)	Edgar V. Moorman (Illinois)	57,925	0.12
1944	19th	Tomlinson Hall, Indianapolis	Nov. 10–12, 1943	Claude A. Watson (California)	Floyd C. Carrier (Maryland) (withdrew); Andrew N. Johnson (Kentucky)	74,758	0.16
1948	20th	Billy Sunday Tabernacle, Winona Lake, Indiana	June 26–28, 1947	Claude A. Watson (California)	Dale H. Learn (Pennsylvania)	103,708	0.21
1952	21st	First Baptist Church & Cadle Tabernacle, Indianapolis	Nov. 12–15, 1951	Stuart Hamblen (California)	Enoch A. Holtwick (Illinois)	73,412	0.12
1956	22nd	Camp Mack, Milford, Indiana	Sept. 4–6, 1955	Enoch A. Holtwick (Illinois)	Herbert C. Holdridge (California) (withdrew); Edwin M. Cooper (California)	41,937	0.07
1960	23rd	Westminster Hotel, Winona Lake	Sept. 1–3, 1959	Rutherford Decker (Missouri)	E. Harold Munn (Michigan)	46,203	0.07
1964	24th	St. Louis	August 26–27, 1963	E. Harold Munn (Michigan)	Mark R. Shaw (Massachusetts)	23,267	0.03
1968	25th	YWCA, Detroit, Mich.	June 28–29, 1967	E. Harold Munn (Michigan)	Rolland E. Fisher (Kansas)	15,123	0.02
1972	26th	Nazarene Church Building, Wichita, Kansas	June 24–25, 1971	E. Harold Munn (Michigan)	Marshall E. Uncapher (Kansas)	13,497	0.02
1976	27th	Beth Eden Baptist Church Bldg, Wheat Ridge, Colo.	June 26–27, 1975	Benjamin C. Bubar (Maine)	Earl F. Dodge (Colorado)	15,932	0.02
1980	28th	Motel Birmingham, Birmingham, Alabama	June 20–21, 1979	Benjamin C. Bubar (Maine)	Earl F. Dodge (Colorado)	7,206	0.01
1984	29th	Mandan, North Dakota	June 22–24, 1983	Earl Dodge (Colorado)	Warren C. Martin (Kansas)	4,243	0.00
1988	30th	Heritage House, Springfield, Illinois	June 25–26, 1987	Earl Dodge (Colorado)	George Ormsby (Pennsylvania)	8,002	0.01
1992	31st	Minneapolis, Minnesota	June 24–26, 1991	Earl Dodge (Colorado)	George Ormsby (Pennsylvania)	961	0.00
1996	32nd	Denver, Colorado	1995	Earl Dodge (Colorado)	Rachel Bubar Kelly (Maine)	1,298	0.00
2000	33rd	Bird-in-Hand, Pennsylvania	June 28–30, 1999	Earl Dodge (Colorado)	W. Dean Watkins (Arizona)	208	0.00
2004	34th	Fairfield Glade, Tennessee	February 1, 2004	Gene Amondson (Washington)	Leroy Pletten (Michigan)	1,944	0.00
2004	[34th]	Lakewood, Colorado	August 2003	Earl Dodge (Colorado)	Howard Lydick (Texas)	140	0.00
2008	35th	Adam's Mark Hotel, Indianapolis	Sept. 13–14, 2007	Gene Amondson (Washington)	Leroy Pletten (Michigan)	655	0.00
2012	36th	Holiday Inn Express, Cullman, Alabama	June 20–22, 2011	Jack Fellure (West Virginia)	Toby Davis (Mississippi)	518	0.00
2016	37th	Conference call	July 31, 2015	James Hedges (Pennsylvania)	Bill Bayes (Mississippi)	5,617	0.00
2020	38th	Conference Call	November 13, 2018	Bill Bayes (Mississippi) withdrew	Connie Gammon (Tennessee)	ticket withdrawn	
2020	39th	Conference Call	April 14, 2019	Connie Gammon (Tennessee) withdrew	Phil Collins (Nevada)	ticket withdrawn	
2020	40th	Conference call	August 24, 2019	Phil Collins (Nevada)	Billy Joe Parker (Georgia)	4,834	0.00
2024	41st	Buffalo, New York	May 10, 2023	Michael Wood (California)	John Pietrowski (Ohio)	1,144	0.00

=== House ===
House electoral history

Year	Number of candidates	Votes	Change
1938	26	8,499 (0.02%)	Steady
1940	48	62,504 (0.13%)	▲0.11%
1942	27	25,413 (0.09%)	▼0.04%
1944	50	35,782 (0.08%)	▼0.01%
1946	43	47,792 (0.14%)	▲0.06%
1948	42	32,648 (0.07%)	▼0.07%
1950	42	34,761 (0.09%)	▲0.02%
1952	49	38,664 (0.07%)	▼0.02%
1954	17	8,591 (0.02%)	▼0.05%
1956	20	12,298 (0.02%)	Steady
1958	22	8,816 (0.02%)	Steady
1960	24	4,841 (0.01%)	▼0.01%
1962	3	17,171 (0.03%)	▲0.02%
1964	1	2,238 (0.00%)	▼0.03%
1966	0	0 (0.00%)	Steady
1968	1	351 (0.00%)	Steady
1972	7	10,902 (0.02%)	▲0.02%
1974	5	8,387 (0.02%)	Steady
1976	3	3,141 (0.00%)	▼0.02%
1978	1	9,992 (0.02%)	▲0.02%
1980	5	7,992 (0.01%)	▼0.01%
1982	1	1,724 (0.00%)	▼0.01%
1984	1	5,942 (0.01%)	▲0.01%

== Notable members ==
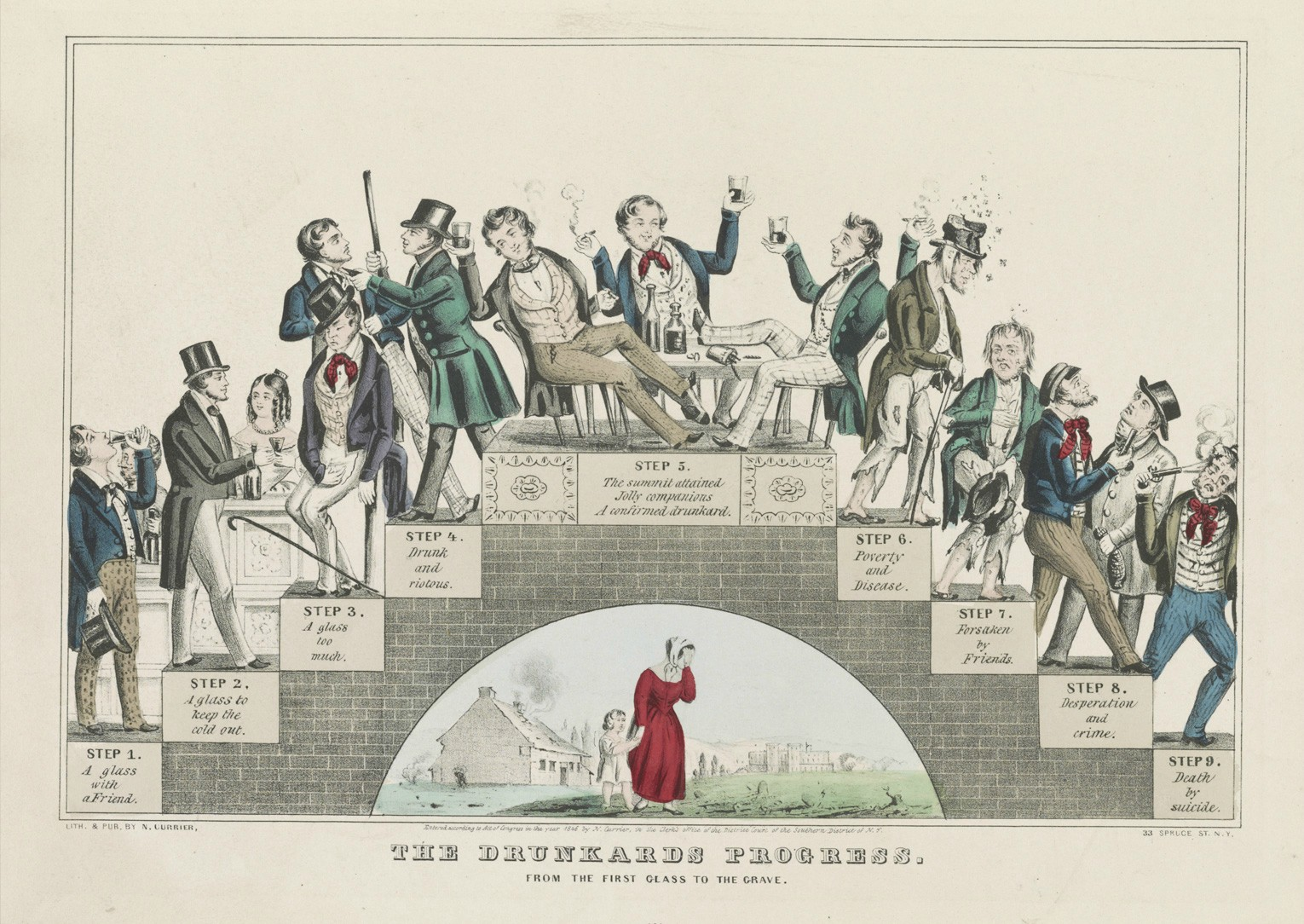
The Drunkard's Progress: A lithograph by Nathaniel Currier supporting the temperance movement, January 1846

- Joseph E. Anderson (1873–1937), Illinois state legislator and most recent Prohibition Party member of the Illinois General Assembly.
- Frances Estill Beauchamp (1860–1923), Kentucky state chair; secretary, national committee
- Marie C. Brehm, first legally qualified woman ever to be nominated for vice president
- Benjamin Bubar Jr., member of the Maine House of Representatives (1939–44)
- Sidney Johnston Catts, 22nd Governor of Florida (1917–21)
- Samuel Dickie, Chairman of the Prohibition Party (1887–99) and the 9th Mayor of Albion, Michigan (1896–97)
- Neal Dow, mayor of Portland, Maine (1851–52; 1855–56)
- Clay Freeman Gaumer, member of the Illinois House of Representatives from Vermilion County during the 35th General Assembly.
- Saxe J. Froshaug, member of the Minnesota Senate (1911–15)
- John R. Golden, member of the Illinois House of Representatives from Ford County during the 45th General Assembly.
- Harvey W. Hardy, mayor of Lincoln, Nebraska (1877–79)
- Frank Hanly, 26th Governor of Indiana (1905–09)
- James Hedges, Tax Assessor for Thompson Township, Pennsylvania (2002–07) and first elected Prohibitionist in the 21st century.
- John H. Hoeppel, U.S. Representative from California, 1933–1937.
- Nicholas L. Johnson, member of the Illinois House of Representatives from Kane County during the 46th General Assembly.
- James Lamont, member of the Illinois House of Representatives from Winnebago County during the 35th General Assembly.
- John St. John, 8th Governor of Kansas (1879–83)
- Charles Hiram Randall, member of the California State Assembly (1911–12) and Representative from California's 9th congressional district (1915–21)
- Frank S. Regan (1862–1944), member of the Illinois House of Representatives from Winnebago County during the 41st General Assembly.
- Susanna M. Salter, first female mayor in the United States (1887–88)
- Daniel R. Sheen (1852–1926), member of the Illinois House of Representatives from Peoria County during the 44th General Assembly.
- Green Clay Smith, Representative from Kentucky's 6th congressional district (1863–66) and 2nd Territorial Governor of Montana (1866–69)
- Emily Pitts Stevens, joined the Prohibition Party in 1882, and led the movement, in 1888, to induce the Woman's Christian Temperance Union to endorse that party.
- Oliver W. Stewart, Chairman of the Prohibition Party (1900–05) and member of the Illinois House of Representatives (1903–05)
- Frances Willard, one of the founders of the Woman's Christian Temperance Union
- Alonzo Wilson (1868–1949), member of the Illinois House of Representatives from DuPage County during the 44th General Assembly.
- Josephus C. Vines, mayor of Brighton, Alabama (1905–06)

== Platform ==
The Prohibition Party platform, as listed on the party's web site in 2024, includes the following points:

=== Social issues ===
- Consistent life ethic
  - Right to life
  - Opposition to abortion
  - Opposition to capital punishment
  - Opposition to physician-assisted suicide
- Opposition to alcohol advertising, nicotine marketing and cannabis advertising
- Imposition of restrictions and increased taxation for all non-medicinal drugs, including alcohol and tobacco
- Campaigns to promote temperance and teetotalism
- Opposition to pornography
- Blue laws prohibiting employers in all fields except public safety from requiring employees to work on the Sunday Sabbath
- Support for voluntary prayer in public schools
- Opposition to attempts to remove religion from the public square
- Recognition of the contributions of immigrants to the United States
- Prohibition on gambling and abolition of all state lotteries
- A "strict interpretation" of the Second Amendment to the United States Constitution that includes a right to use arms for defense
- Opposition to testing on animals
- Prohibition on use of animals in sport

=== Economic issues ===
- Abolition of the United States Federal Reserve and re-establishment of the Bank of the United States
- Strict laws against usury
- Right to work
- A fully funded Social Security system
- A Balanced Budget Amendment
- Increased spending on public works projects
- Opposition of government financial interference in, or aid to, commerce
- Free college education for all Americans
- Job training programs paid for by tariffs

=== Foreign policy issues ===
- A non-interventionist foreign policy
- Eliminating conscription in times of peace
- Opposition to military action that violates Just War principles
- Fair trade
- Use of human rights considerations in determining most favored nation status
- A generous policy of asylum for people facing persecution or living in inhumane conditions

== Chairmen ==
In 1867, John Russell became the first chairman of the Prohibition Party, with Earl Dodge serving the longest for twenty four years and Gregory Seltzer serving the shortest for one year.

Past chairmen
- 1867–1872: John Russell
- 1872–1876: Simeon B. Chase
- 1876–1880: James Black
- 1880–1884: Gideon T. Stewart
- 1884–1887: John B. Finch
- 1887–1899: Samuel Dickie
- 1900–1905: Oliver W. Stewart
- 1905–1908: Charles R. Jones
- 1908–1924: Virgil G. Hinshaw
- 1924–1925: B. E. P. Prugh
- 1925–1932: D. Leigh Colvin
- 1932–1947: Edward E. Blake
- 1947–1950: Virgil C. Finnell
- 1950–1953: Gerald Overholt
- 1953–1955: Lowell H. Coate
- 1955–1971: E. Harold Munn
- 1971–1979: Charles Wesley Ewing
- 1979–2003: Earl Dodge
- 2003–2005: Don Webb
- 2005–2009: Gene Amondson
- 2009–2013: Toby Davis
- 2013–2014: Gregory Seltzer
- 2014–2019: Rick Knox
- 2019–2020: Randy McNutt
- 2020–2023: Phil Collins
- 2023–Present: Zack Kusnir

== See also ==
- 19th-century newspapers that supported the Prohibition Party
- Alcohol during and after prohibition
- Law Preservation Party (New York branch of the Prohibition Party)
- List of political parties in the United States
- Scottish Prohibition Party
- Robert P. Shuler
- Temperance organizations
