= 1951 Prohibition National Convention =

- 1952 presidential election

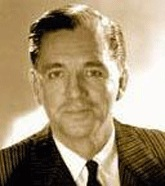
- Presidential nominee (Hamblen)

Convention
- Dates: November 12, 1951 (mass gathering); November 13–15, 1951 (convention)
- City: Indianapolis, Indiana
- Venue: Cadle Tabernacle (mass gathering); First Baptist Church (convention)

Candidates
- Presidential nominee: Stuart Hamblen of California
- Vice-presidential nominee: Enoch A. Holtwick of Illinois

Voting
- Total delegates: 112 (voting)
- Votes needed for nomination: 56
- Results (president): Hamblen: 74 (66.1%); Holtwick: 41 (36.6%)
- Results (vice president): Holtwick by acclamation
- Ballots: 1

The 1951 Prohibition National Convention was held November 13–15, 1951, in Indianapolis, Indiana, with a preceding rally held on November 12. It saw the Prohibition Party nominate celebrity-turned-evangelist Stuart Hamblen for president in the 1952 United States presidential election, with college history professor Enoch A. Holtwick nominated as his vice presidential running mate.

== Logistics ==
Newspaper advertisement (published in The Indianapolis Star) for the mass gathering (rally) and convention

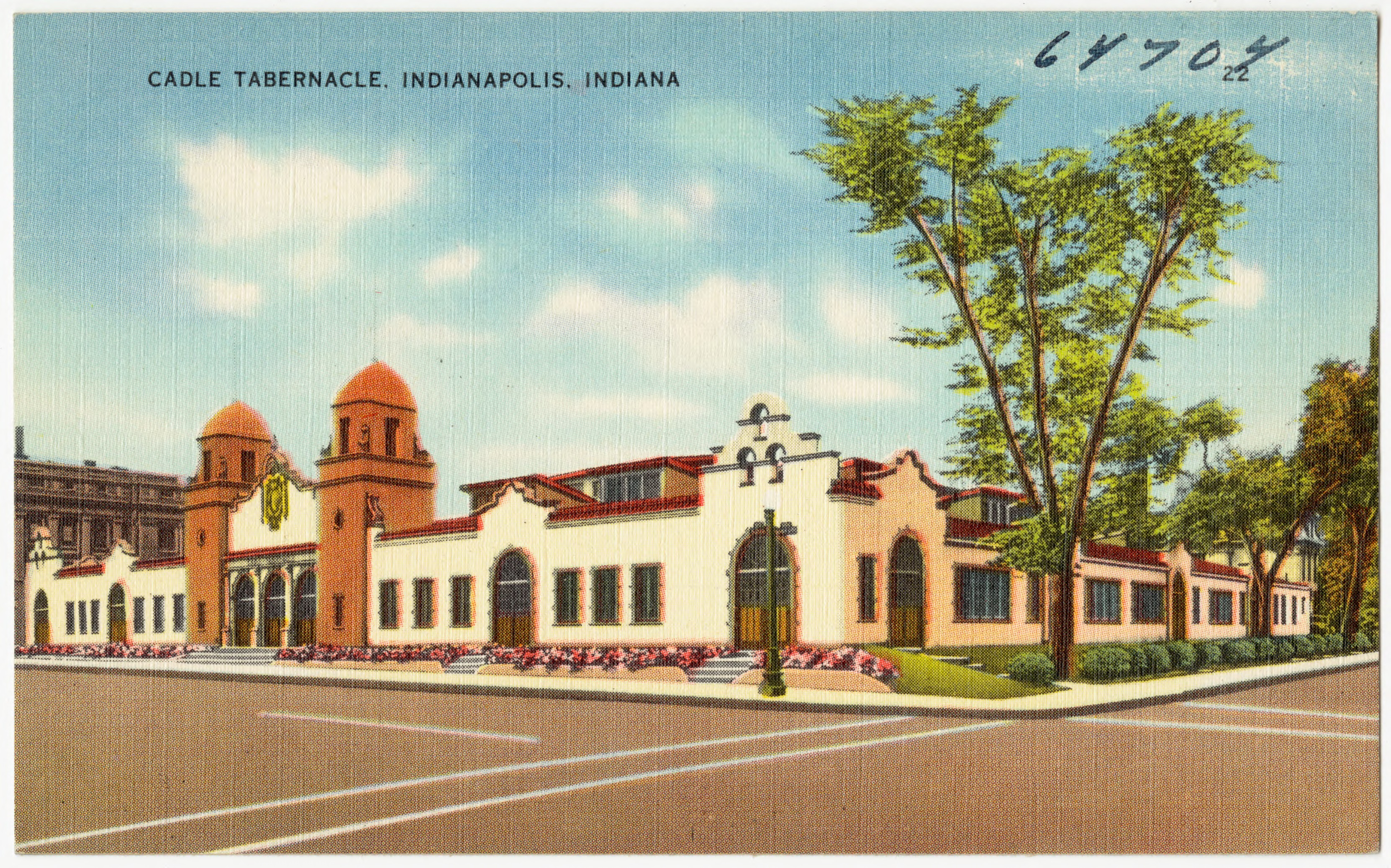
Postcard of the Cadle Tabernacle, venue of the mass gathering

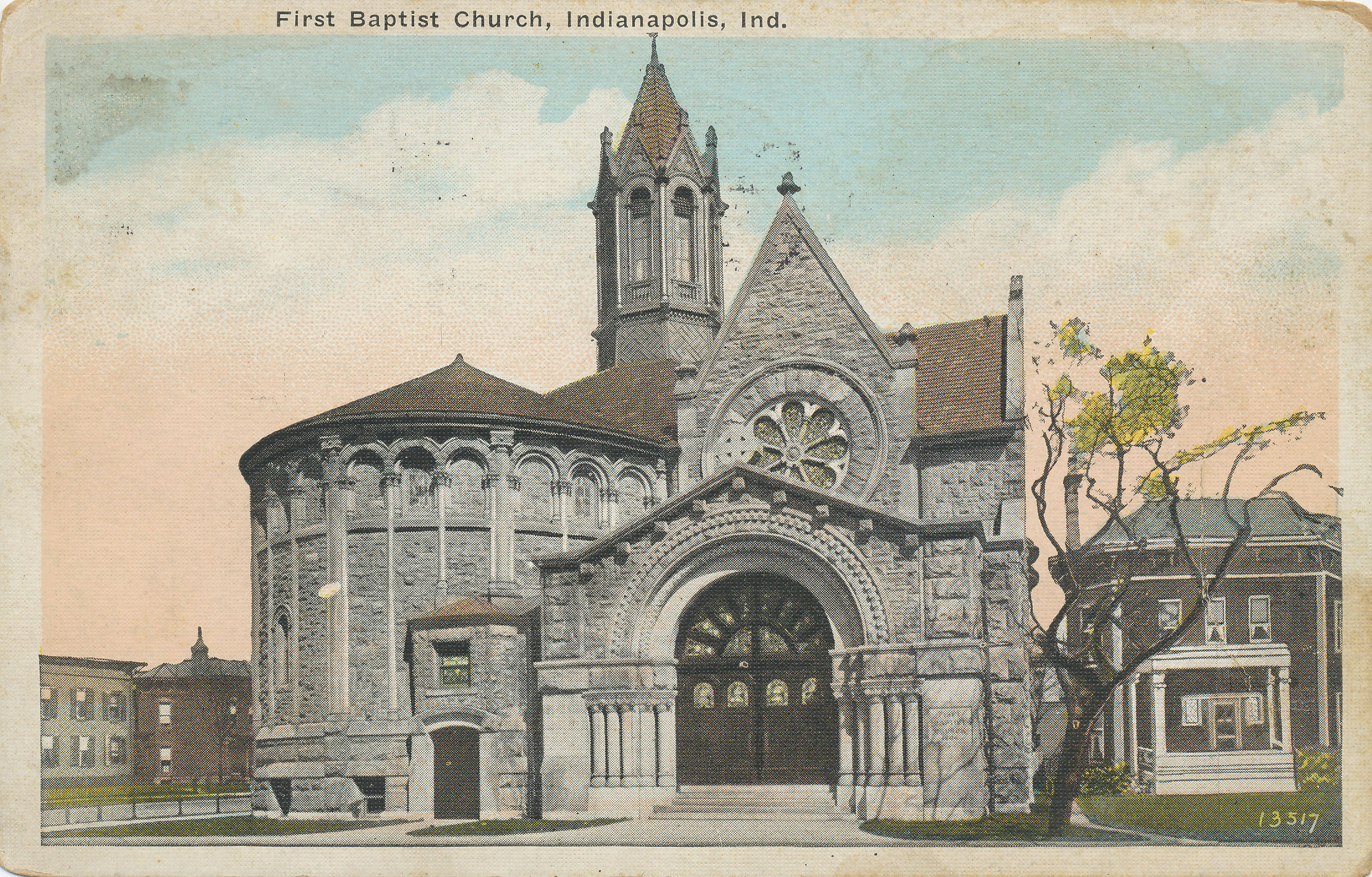
Postcard of the First Baptist Church, venue of the convention

The convention held its official proceedings at the 1,500 seat First Baptist Church, November 13–15. The proceedings were preceded by a November 12 rally at the 10,000 seat Cadle Tabernacle. At the time, the Tabernacle was considered to be the largest auditorium in Indianapolis. As the Prohibition Party declined in prominence, it often held its conventions in progressively less grand venues. When the already-declining party previously held its convention at the Cadle Tabernacle in 1932, Time magazine had noted that the venue's lack of grandeur, describing the space as being defined by "low gloomy rafters". In 1951, roughly twenty years later, the party only managed to half-fill the venue for the mass assembly held in conjunction with the convention (with 5,000 attendees in the 10,000 capacity facility), and the official business of the convention was held in a much smaller venue.

The state of Indiana was a regular location for the party's conventions. Indianapolis had been the site of the 1888, 1904, 1932, and 1943 conventions. Winona Lake, Indiana was the site of the party's convention in 1947 and later in 1959. Milford (in Kosciusko County, Indiana) was later the site of its convention in 1955.

Most states were represented by delegates at the convention. Several of those in attendance at the convention were members of the Taylorites religious sect.

Enoch A. Holtwick served as presiding officer during the convention.

== Mass gathering ==
The mass gathering was held on November 12, the eve of the official proceedings of the convention. It was headlined by celebrity Stuart Hamblen, a film, radio, and rodeo celebrity who had pivoted into work as an evangelist speaker and gospel musician. It was expected that Hamblen's celebrity would be enough for organizers to fill the entirety of the 10,000-seat venue for the mass gathering. However, the reported attendance ultimately numbered at only 5,000.

== Nominations ==
Among those who came to Indianapolis seeking the party's presidential nomination was Homer A. Tomilnson, bishop of the Church of God. He desired for the party to nominate him for president, and wanted Dwight D. Eisenhower's name to be nominated for vice president. The party's spokesperson had inquired, ahead of the election, with Douglas MacArthur as to whether he'd make himself available to be the party's nominee, which MacArthur declined.

Rally headliner Stuart Hamblen was nominated for president. Coming second to him in the balloting was dark horse contender Enoch A. Holtwick, a history professor at Greenville College in Illinois. With only 112 delegates voting, only 56 votes were needed to obtain a majority needed for nomination. Hamblen won on the first ballot, receiving 74 votes to Holwick's 41. Hamblen, however, was not present to deliver an acceptance speech, having left Indianapolis for New York after the rally. He agreed to the nomination, intending to run a Bible-focused campaign for the presidency. After the presidential balloting, Holwick was nominated for vice president by acclamation.

After the presidential balloting, and prior to the convention adjourning, a motion was introduced to rename the party. This was rejected.
