= Fredericksburg, Indiana =

- Census-designated place
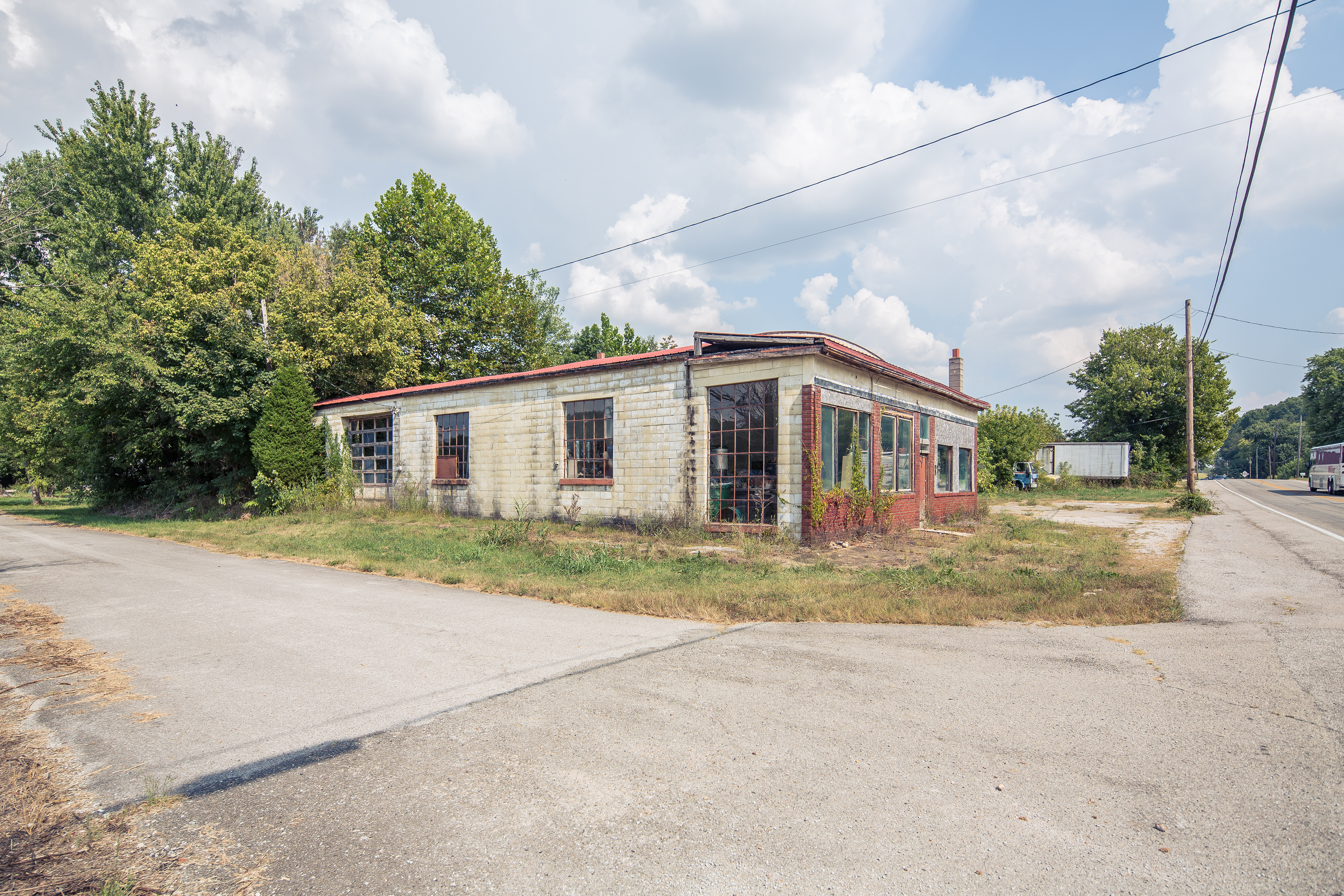

- Location of Fredericksburg in Washington County, Indiana.
- Coordinates: 38°25′57″N 86°11′24″W
- Country: United States
- State: Indiana
- County: Washington
- Township: Posey

Area
  - Total: 1.09 sq mi (2.83 km^{2})
  - Land: 1.07 sq mi (2.78 km^{2})
  - Water: 0.019 sq mi (0.05 km^{2})
- Elevation: 614 ft (187 m)

Population (2020)
  - Total: 129
  - Density: 120.0/sq mi (46.32/km^{2})
- Time zone: UTC-5 (Eastern (EST))
  - Summer (DST): UTC-5 (EST)
- ZIP code: 47120
- Area codes: 812, 930
- FIPS code: 18-25720
- GNIS feature ID: 434794

Fredericksburg is an unincorporated community in Posey Township, Washington County, in the U.S. state of Indiana. As of the 2020 census, Fredericksburg had a population of 129. It had a population of 85 at the 2010 census, when it was a town.

== History ==
Fredericksburg was laid out in 1815. It was named for Frederick Royse, the original owner of the town site. Fredericksburg was incorporated as a town in 1859. The town disincorporated in June 2012.

The Fredericksburg post office has been in operation since 1819.

== Geography ==
Fredericksburg is located at 38°25′57″N 86°11′24″W (38.432609, -86.190128). It is located on the Blue River, just downriver from the confluence of its North and South Forks. The river was a valuable resource in the town's beginning as the construction of a water mill brought growth and prosperity to the town. As electricity nullified the need to be located near water, the river became a liability. The town, located on a floodplain, is prone to flooding. The frequent flooding pushed the town into decline, encouraging many residents and businesses to flee the town or move to higher land.

According to the 2010 census, Fredericksburg has a total area of 1.01 square miles (2.62 km^{2}), of which 0.99 square miles (2.56 km^{2}) (or 98.02%) is land and 0.02 square miles (0.05 km^{2}) (or 1.98%) is water.

== Demographics ==
Historical population
Census	Pop.	Note	%±
2010	85		—
2020	129		51.8%
U.S. Decennial Census

=== 2010 census ===
As of the census of 2010, there were 85 people, 35 households, and 22 families living in the town. The population density was 85.9 inhabitants per square mile (33.2/km^{2}). There were 41 housing units at an average density of 41.4 per square mile (16.0/km^{2}). The racial makeup of the town was 92.9% White, 2.4% Native American, and 4.7% from two or more races. Hispanic or Latino of any race were 5.9% of the population.

There were 35 households, of which 34.3% had children under the age of 18 living with them, 40.0% were married couples living together, 17.1% had a female householder with no husband present, 5.7% had a male householder with no wife present, and 37.1% were non-families. 37.1% of all households were made up of individuals, and 20% had someone living alone who was 65 years of age or older. The average household size was 2.43 and the average family size was 3.18.

The median age in the town was 33.3 years. 29.4% of residents were under the age of 18; 8.3% were between the ages of 18 and 24; 28.2% were from 25 to 44; 17.7% were from 45 to 64; and 16.5% were 65 years of age or older. The gender makeup of the town was 55.3% male and 44.7% female.

=== 2000 census ===
As of the census of 2000, there were 92 people, 41 households, and 25 families living in the town. The population density was 91.7 inhabitants per square mile (35.4/km^{2}). There were 44 housing units at an average density of 43.9 per square mile (16.9/km^{2}). The racial makeup of the town was 100.00% White. Hispanic or Latino of any race were 1.09% of the population.

There were 41 households, out of which 29.3% had children under the age of 18 living with them, 43.9% were married couples living together, 12.2% had a female householder with no husband present, and 36.6% were non-families. 31.7% of all households were made up of individuals, and 9.8% had someone living alone who was 65 years of age or older. The average household size was 2.24 and the average family size was 2.77.

In the town, the population was spread out, with 21.7% under the age of 18, 8.7% from 18 to 24, 34.8% from 25 to 44, 17.4% from 45 to 64, and 17.4% who were 65 years of age or older. The median age was 39 years. For every 100 females, there were 109.1 males. For every 100 females age 18 and over, there were 100.0 males.

The median income for a household in the town was $21,250, and the median income for a family was $31,563. Males had a median income of $25,000 versus $35,250 for females. The per capita income for the town was $10,626. There were 21.4% of families and 23.5% of the population living below the poverty line, including 19.0% of under eighteens and 23.1% of those over 64.

== Education ==
It is in the West Washington School Corporation.

== Notable people ==
- Nathan Kimball, physician, politician, postmaster, and military officer.
- E. Howard Cadle, businessman, speaker, evangelist
