= Frank S. Regan =

American businessman and politician (1862–1944)

Frank Stewart Regan
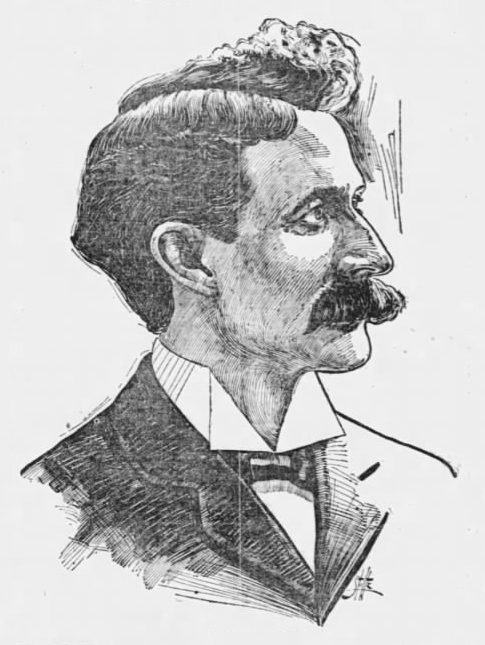

Member of the Illinois House of Representatives from the 10th district
- In office 1899–1900

Personal details
- Born: October 3, 1862 Rockford, Illinois, U.S.
- Died: July 25, 1944 (aged 81) Canton, Illinois, U.S.
- Party: Prohibition Party

Frank Stewart Regan (October 3, 1862 – July 25, 1944) was an American businessman and politician.

== Biography ==
Regan was born in Rockford, Illinois and graduated from Rockford High School. He was involved with the Rockford Abstract Company. Regan served on the Rockford City Council. Regan served in the Illinois House of Representatives in 1899 and 1900 and was elected on the Prohibition Party ticket. He was elected from the 10th district which included Winnebago and Ogle counties in northern Illinois. He was the Prohibition Party's candidate for Illinois Attorney General in 1908 and Illinois Treasurer in 1930. He served as the vice-president nominee on the Prohibition Party ticket in the 1932 United States presidential election. Regan died in Canton, Illinois, from a skull fracture, after falling in a bathtub at his son's home.
