= E. Howard Cadle =

American Christian evangelist

- Born: August 25, 1884; Fredericksburg, Indiana
- Died: December 20, 1942 (aged 58); Indianapolis, Indiana
- Occupation: Evangelist
- Spouse: Ola Cadle
- Children: Buford Cadle, Helen Cadle, and Virginia Ann Cadle
- Parent(s): Loretta "Etta" and Thomas Cadle

E. "Emmett" Howard Cadle (August 25, 1884 – December 20, 1942) was a Christian evangelist based in Indianapolis, Indiana. After his conversion in 1914, he built the Cadle Tabernacle in Indianapolis in 1921 and contributed to the growth of the radio evangelical movement during the 1930s. With the extended power of WLW, a radio station based in Cincinnati, Ohio, Cadle's broadcasts reached an estimated 30 million listeners by the end of the 1930s. In addition, Cadle frequently traveled by plane and car to reach speaking engagements in the Midwest and southern United States when he was not recording broadcasts.

== Early life ==
Cadle was born in Fredericksburg, Indiana, on August 25, 1884. His ancestors migrated from eastern Tennessee to Indiana in the 1830s. Cadle's father, Thomas Cadle, and grandfather farmed in Fredericksburg, but he saw himself as different. As Cadle later wrote, "I was always full of energy.... I always wanted to ride the wildest horse we had, and when I could not find one wild enough, I would ride a steer."

His mother, Loretta "Etta" Cadle, a Christian since childhood, helped raise money to bring a revivalist to the town of Fredericksburg. Within six weeks, the men of the town were reportedly happy and changed. Cadle's father was among those converted to Christianity. A permanent church was also established in the town, but unlike his father, Cadle resisted conversion. At the age of twelve he was drinking alcohol and playing poker with his friends.

== Marriage and family ==
E. Howard Cadle married Ola Collier in December 1904. After they moved west to Oklahoma City, Oklahoma, in 1905, he earned an income unloading potatoes from railroad cars. Cadle also resumed drinking and gambling with friends before returning to Indiana and settling in Indianapolis. During this time Cadle had neglected his wife and newborn son, Buford.

=== Converted Christian ===
After Cadle was diagnosed with Bright's disease in spring, 1914, his doctor gave him six months to live. Cadle returned to his mother's home in Fredericksburg, where she and his family welcomed him. Cadle later described his conversion experience which began after a long prayer session through an afternoon and night. Cadle awoke feeling unchanged, so his mother encouraged him to lay down again. The next time he awoke, "[A]ll the beauty of heaven seemed to burst into the windows. The old, dead apple tree seemed to be in full bloom and I could hear the rustle of the wings of angels of mercy. My sins were washed away! I arose as my conversion dawned on me and started to greet my mother, but I did not need to say a word, I leaped into her arms. 'It's done, it's done, the great transaction is done!' she sang joyfully."

After Cadle recovered his health, he began a new life, going on to become a businessman, evangelist, and radio broadcaster.

== Career ==
=== Salesman ===
During the years following his conversion, Cadle pursued new ways to make money, mostly as a salesman. He bought several slot machines and placed them in hotels, saloons, and restaurants throughout Indiana and later in Kentucky and Illinois, earning him the moniker of "The Slot Machine King." However, the Indiana Supreme Court classified them as gambling devices and they were subsequently confiscated. Cadle then worked at a saloon as a dishwasher, but was fired due to poor work ethic. A short time later he opened his own saloon, but this closed down due to financial troubles.

After the closure of his saloon, Cadle began a new career as a salesman. Although he started by selling suits, Cadle took a job at the National Biscuit Company making $30 a week and quickly rose through the ranks. While keeping his job at Nabisco, Cadle began selling cars, eventually making enough to buy out the dealership where he worked with a business partner. In 1916, while visiting an old shoe repair store, he came up with the idea of establishing a drop-in shoe repair shop. Along with a partner, who he eventually bought out, Cadle pursued the idea, developing it into a chain of stores. By 1918 he had twenty-two shoe repair stores in operation in various Midwestern cities and his company made a profit of $85,000 that year. Cadle's own earnings from the business allowed him to drive a $7,000 car and live in a $30,000 house.

In addition to his various business ventures, Cadle engaged in philanthropic causes. In 1920 he built his first tabernacle, a 1,200-seat facility in Louisville, Kentucky. He later donated the building to the United Brethren Church. Cadle reportedly wanted to build more tabernacles throughout southern Indiana and Kentucky, but this never occurred. In early 1921 he contributed to a citywide revival in Indianapolis that featured evangelist Rodney "Gipsy" Smith.

=== Evangelist ===
The Cadle Tabernacle in Indianapolis, Indiana, was originally announced on May 20, 1921, with an estimated initial cost of $75,000. The meeting hall could seat 10,000, with plans for 1,000 choir seats. The final number of choir seats was increased to 1,400. The initial plan for the tabernacle was to allow Gypsy Smith's revival choir to organize there on a permanent basis, but the idea lead to controversy and accusations from other Christian groups. One accusation claimed that Cadle intended to create a church around himself, which he denied.

Construction on the building began in the summer of 1921 with workers rushing to complete it on time. Its final cost was $305,000 ($4.3 million adjusted for inflation), significantly higher than the initial estimate. During the dedication services on October 9, 1921, the tabernacle was filled to capacity with an estimated 10,000 more turned away. Gypsy Smith returned for building's dedication and Cadle also addressed the gathering, explaining how his mother prayed for his conversion and praised the choir.

Other issues arose after the tabernacle's dedication, including claims that the city owned it and the intentions of its leadership to host various, non-secular events, which the tabernacle's board disputed. The tabernacle was built at a time when the largest public auditorium in Indianapolis could seat 3,500. Public ownership of the tabernacle building would allow the city to host even larger events. Indianapolis's newly elected mayor, Lew Shank, proposed that the city offer to buy the tabernacle, but Cadle refused the offer, prompting the mayor's threat to take legal action. Because the building held secular events it did not pay taxes. In addition, claims were made that the Ku Klux Klan funded Cadle after eighteen of them gave a combined $600 and a letter of appreciation to visiting evangelist, E.J. Bulgin, and the Cadle Tabernacle Evangelistic Association. The board encouraged Cadle to leave the tabernacle for reasons unrelated to these controversies. The details are not clear, but Cadle claimed the board accused him of taking money from the offering. As a result of the criticisms, Cadle sold his interest in the tabernacle in June 1923 to an organization that promised to continue its religious program. Cadle also announced in October 1923 that he would compete with the tabernacle in Indianapolis by building a new auditorium and business center, but the plans were never realized.

In 1925 Cadle moved his family to Florida, where they lived in the Tampa area for two years. During this time Cadle speculated in the real estate market and lost $150,000. With little money left, he and his family returned to Indianapolis in early 1927.

=== Aspiring politician ===
In addition to his work as an evangelist, Cadle briefly considered running for political offices before abandoning the idea. In 1924 he announced his goal to run for mayor of Indianapolis, but he did not complete his plan. In 1927 he considered running for governor in the 1928 election. His mother encouraged him to abandon the idea, believing it would be better for him to be the poorest of preachers than the best governor. After contemplating his future, Cadle decided to continue his career as an evangelist.

=== Radio broadcaster ===
After Cadle's return to Indiana from Florida, he continued his evangelistic pursuits. In 1931 he raised funds to regain control of the tabernacle he established in Indianapolis, reopening it in October 1931. Cadle soon began broadcasting a daily radio program. In 1932 he secured a spot on WLW, a Cincinnati, Ohio, station that by 1934 was capable of transmitting a 500,000-watt signal, the only station permitted to do so at the time. Cadle's program, "The Nation's Family Prayer Period," aired from 6:00 to 6:15 a.m., Monday through Saturday, and from 11:00 to 11:30 a.m. on Sunday. During the program Cadle often discussed the tabernacle's physical size and what he had accomplished since his conversion to Christianity.

Cadle's radio program attracted thousands of listeners. In 1934 about 24,000 letters arrived at his office each month. By 1939 his audience was estimated at thirty million. Cadle's program reached as many as 600 rural mountain churches, or 60,000 people. Many of his listeners indicated that they used the broadcast as a part of their devotional time.

=== Traveling evangelist ===
Cadle also traveled extensively. After speaking at the tabernacle or conducting a broadcast session, he often took day trips with staff. His son, Buford Cadle, served as pilot of Cadle's private airplane when he flew to speak in cities throughout the Midwest and South, frequently in widely advertised visits. One audience in Dayton, Ohio, was estimated at 3,000. By 1941 Cadle and his assistants had driven an estimated 250,000 miles and had flown about 500,000 miles to arrange and conduct these meetings.

One morning in October 1942, after finishing a broadcast from Indianapolis, Cadle checked into a local hospital. This was one of many times when he suffered from illness connected to his kidney disease. Updates were given to his listeners and readers as his condition worsened. Cadle was moved to his Indianapolis home on North Meridian Street, where he remained until his death.

== Death and legacy ==
Cadle died on December 20, 1942, from Bright's disease at age fifty-eight. His remains are buried near his ancestor's family plot at Kay's Chapel Cemetery in Fredericksburg, Indiana. A large gravestone with a rendering on the back of monument depicting the Indianapolis tabernacle marks the gravesite of Cadle and his wife, Ola.

After his death, Ola M. Cadle took over as president and director of the tabernacle until her death in 1955. Ola and Howard Cadle's three children, Buford, Helen, and Virginia Ann Cadle, ran the family's evangelism business. In time they expanded to new mediums, including a short-lived television program in 1952. They also opened the tabernacle to serve as a venue for several other events, including one where Dr. Martin Luther King Jr. spoke in 1958. The Cadle family sold the tabernacle property in 1968 to a local bank and the tabernacle was demolished later that year. The vacant site served as a parking lot for the bank's new building, the Indiana National Bank Tower. The parking lot was replaced during the 2000s with a housing development.

Cadle is best known for his evangelical pursuits, particularly the large audiences he reached through his daily radio broadcasts in the 1930s and his efforts to reach additional people through extensive travels across the Midwest and southern United States, as well as the Cadle Tabernacle, now demolished, established in Indianapolis in 1921.
