= Cadle Tabernacle =

Church in Indianapolis, Indiana, US

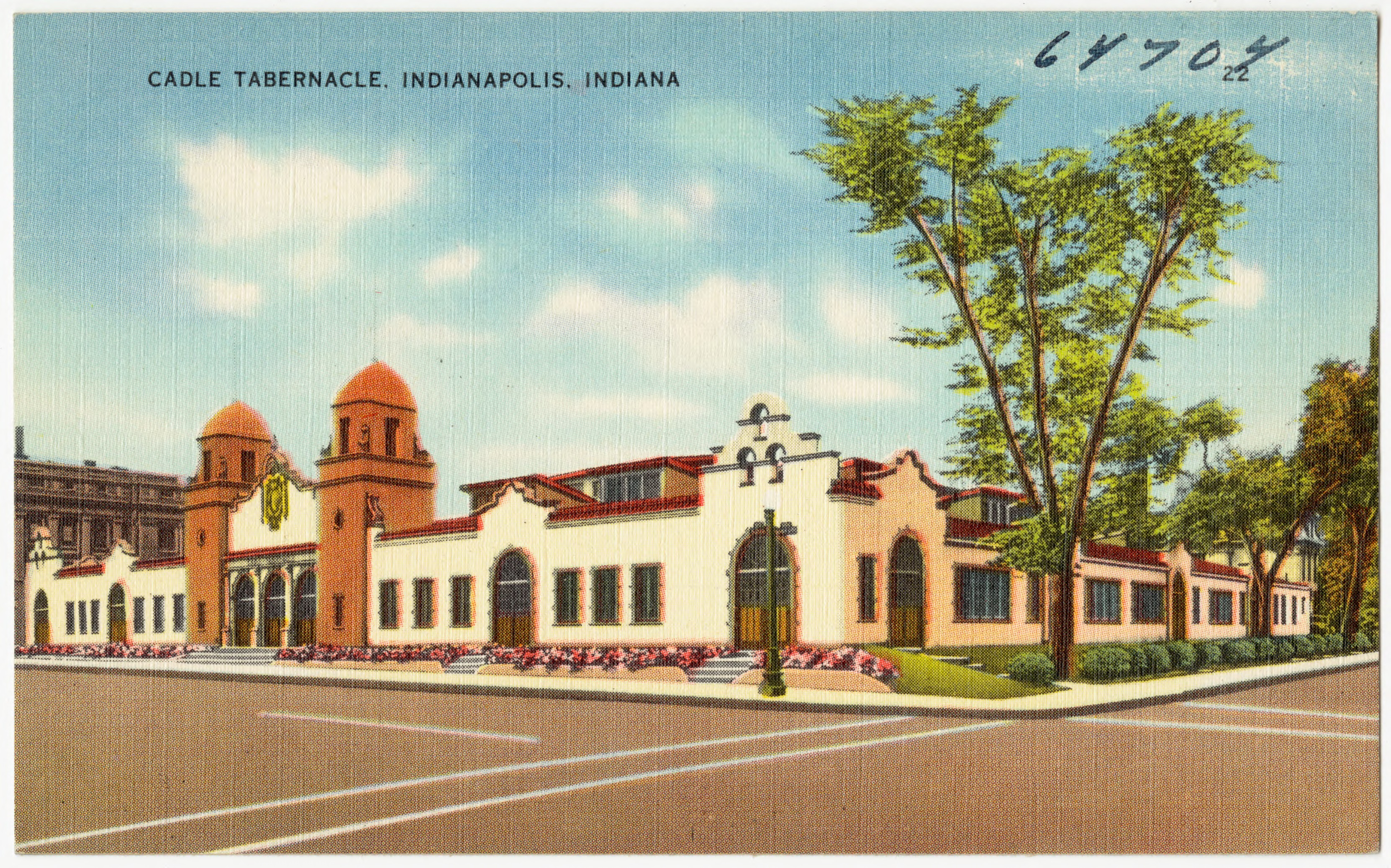
- An artist's rendering of the Cadle Tabernacle
- Interactive map of the Cadle Tabernacle area

General information
- Status: Demolished
- Architectural style: Spanish Mission
- Location: Indianapolis, Indiana, United States
- Coordinates: 39°46′12″N 86°09′04″W
- Named for: Loretta "Etta" Cadle
- Construction started: Summer 1921
- Inaugurated: October 9, 1921
- Demolished: 1968
- Cost: $305,000

Design and construction
- Developer: E. Howard Cadle

Other information
- Seating capacity: 10,000 plus 1,400 choir

The Cadle Tabernacle was a church established in Indianapolis, Indiana, in 1921 by its founder, E. Howard Cadle. Named in honor of Cadle's mother, Loretta "Etta" Cadle, the building served as a center for evangelical programs and broadcasts on the Cincinnati, Ohio, radio station WLW in the 1930s, reaching listeners throughout the Midwest and parts of the South. The building's seating capacity of 10,000 made it the largest of its kind in the United States when it was built. Cadle Tabernacle was demolished in 1968 and the site then used for other purposes.

== Early years ==
Following his conversion to Christianity and overcoming alcohol and gambling addiction, E. Howard Cadle, an Indiana businessman who owned a chain of shoe repair shops and worked as a car salesman, had a strong desire to evangelize. After studying the large crowds that traveling evangelists attracted, he decided to construct a building in Indianapolis for their use. Cadle took note of the upcoming revival tour by Rodney "Gipsy" Smith and his choir in Indianapolis, a widely publicized event in the spring of 1921. He met with Smith to discuss the choir's future meeting plans as the revival ended. These initially included monthly meetings and interval concerts.

On May 20, 1921, a month after his meeting with Smith, Cadle expanded his initial goal of sponsoring meetings to establishing a permanent structure whose estimated cost was $75,000. The plans for the building included seating for 10,000 and an additional 1,000 choir seats, though the final number of seats for the choir was 1,400. The tabernacle's seating capacity made it the largest in the United States. Construction on the building began in the summer of 1921 with workers rushing to complete it in time for the dedication services later that fall. The final construction cost was $305,000 ($4.3 million adjusted for inflation), significantly higher than the initial estimate.

Gypsy Smith and his choir returned for the dedication services on October 9, 1921. The tabernacle was filled to capacity and an estimated 10,000 more turned away. During the dedication program, Cadle also addressed the gathering, explaining how his mother prayed for his conversion, praising the choir, and unveiling life-size portraits of himself and his mother, hung on either side of the choir loft. Cadle named the new building in honor of his mother, Loretta "Etta" Cadle.

== Controversies ==
The initial plan for the Cadle Tabernacle was to allow Gypsy Smith's revival choir to organize on a permanent basis. This led to controversy, which was well publicized in newspapers at the time. The Methodists, a large and influential section of Indianapolis's Protestant base, feared it would interfere with their ministry plans. Other ministries, such as the Unitarians, felt that the tabernacle hurt Christian unity by splitting religious groups in Indianapolis. Cadle denied these accusations and others that claimed he created the Cadle Tabernacle for self-serving motives. Additional issues arose when Indianapolis Mayor Charles Jewett misunderstood the building's purpose as being dedicated to the city of Indianapolis, allowing it to be used for municipal functions. The misunderstanding occurred after Cadle had promised to use the building for public uses but not to donate it to Indianapolis.

In November 1921, Cadle and the tabernacle's board disputed control of the tabernacle's evangelistic program. The board gained final authority, but Cadle disagreed with the decision. The dispute led Bob Jones, who had planned to meet at the tabernacle, to cancel his plans. A month later, in December 1921, Cadle announced his plans to turn the tabernacle into a multi-use convention center, at a time when the largest public auditorium in Indianapolis seated 3,500. Samuel L. Shank, the newly elected mayor of Indianapolis, proposed buying the tabernacle building, but Cadle refused. Mayor Shank pointed out that legal action might be taken against the tabernacle and its tax exemption as a religious institution cancelled if it held secular events. He never pursued this, however.

Another issue occurred in April 1923 when a group of Ku Klux Klan members gave $600 and a letter of appreciation to visiting evangelist E. J. Bulgin and the Cadle Tabernacle Evangelistic Association. This led Tolerance, a Chicago-based anti-Klan newspaper, to claim that the Klan funded E. Howard Cadle. After a dispute, the tabernacle's board encouraged him to leave the tabernacle, so Cadle sold his financial interest to the building in June 1923 to an organization that promised to continue its religious program and moved to Florida. The details of the disagreement between Cadle and the board are unclear. The board was accused of targeting Cadle for taking money from the offering, an unsubstantiated claim. It is possible that Cadle may have had financial problems too.

After Cadle left Indiana, the tabernacle sponsored various events, including boxing matches (one of which Cadle protested in October 1928) and dance marathons. On May 12, 1924, the Klan met at the tabernacle under Grand Dragon D. C. Stephenson to declare the Hoosier Klan was independent from the Klan's headquarters in Atlanta, Georgia, due to disagreements over the organization's operations.

Outside of these events, during much of the 1920s the tabernacle fell into disuse. Ownership eventually reverted to the bank until Cadle returned to Indianapolis in 1931. With a fundraising event and media support, he raised enough money to reopen the tabernacle in October 1931, ten years after its initial opening.

== Radio revival ==
After the Cadle Tabernacle reopened in 1931, Cadle began doing radio broadcasts from the tabernacle, although they were initially aired only locally. In 1932, Cadle secured a deal with WLW, a radio station based in Cincinnati, Ohio. The station's new high-wattage signals, capable of transmitting at 500,000 watts by 1934, could reach Canada and parts of Central America under ideal conditions. However, most of the station's listeners lived in the Midwest and upper South, where the station enjoyed its best reception. The station's high-power broadcasts led to an increased listener base compared to its previous 50,000-watt broadcasts and WLW reported receiving five times its typical amount of mail six months after the wattage increase. WLW was the first station in the United States approved to broadcast at the higher wattage.

WLW broadcast Cadle's program, The Nation's Family Prayer Period, every morning for a decade. The program featured singing by his wife, Ola Cadle, or a guest performer. His son, Buford Cadle, introduced and closed the broadcasts, which ran from 6:00 to 6:15 a.m, Monday to Saturday, and from 11:00 to 11:30 a.m. on Sunday. Topics often included how Cadle went from being an alcoholic to the founder of the world's largest interdenominational institution.

In 1934, the Cadle Tabernacle received an average of 24,000 letters a month, requiring twenty staff members to process. By 1939, the volume of letters had decreased to an estimated 4,000 a week and the program's estimated listening range was thirty million. Listeners used his broadcast as part of their devotional period, with some considering Cadle a close friend. Cadle also broadened the reach of his broadcast so more rural areas could listen, giving out free radios. An estimated 330 to 600 rural mountain churches (about 60,000 people) tuned into his show in southern Indiana, Kentucky, West Virginia, and Ohio.

In the late 1930s, the Federal Communications Commission required WLW to reduce its broadcast wattage from 500,000 to 50,000 watts. After this change, Cadle began broadcasting his program on the Mutual Broadcasting System, a nationwide radio network, beginning in the early 1940s.

== Decline and new uses ==
After Cadle's death in 1942, his wife, Ola Cadle, took over as president and director of the tabernacle, while the couple's children, Buford Cadle, Helen Cadle, and Virginia Ann Cadle, ran the evangelism business. B. R. Lakin, a Baptist preacher and evangelist, took over Cadle's position as senior pastor and continued to broadcast his program. In 1952 the Cadle family began to air a short-lived television program hosted in the tabernacle. After Ola Cadle's death in 1955, the tabernacle was rented to a range of groups, including the annual Indiana State Teachers Association conferences and Shortridge High School graduations. Dr. Martin Luther King Jr. also spoke at the tabernacle on December 12, 1958.

By the late 1960s, the tabernacle was in need of repairs. A historian visiting the property in 1967 noted the dirty walls and creaky floors. A buyer also became interested in purchasing the land. On November 1, 1968, the decision was made to demolish the tabernacle, accomplished before the end of the year. The vacant property was used as a parking lot for the Indiana National Bank Tower, which was under construction at the time. Later, the parking lot was replaced with a housing development.

== Description ==
The Cadle Tabernacle was built in 1921 in downtown Indianapolis at the northwest corner of New Jersey and Ohio Streets, a block east of the Indianapolis City Hall. Its final cost was $305,000 ($4.3 million adjusted for inflation). The tabernacle had 19 entrances, 226 windows, and a floor of crushed limestone. Its seating for 10,000 and a 1,400-person choir made it the largest of its kind in the United States. The Spanish-Mission style building, which covered a quarter of a city block, had whitewashed walls and a red tiled roof. Its Ohio Street façade was influenced by the Alamo. Constructed mainly from stucco, the interior was painted ivory and its steel roof supports were painted green. The tabernacle's stage could be reconfigured for pageants and other events.

The tabernacle building was demolished in the late 1960s and the vacant lot was used as a parking lot.

== Legacy ==
The Cadle Tabernacle functioned as a meeting hall and a multi-disciplinary religious institution, especially between 1921 and 1955. It also played a major role in the evangelical community of the Midwest and upper South when E. Howard Cadle was an active evangelist. Cadle and other notable evangelists, including Billy Sunday and Oral Roberts, preached at the site. Dr. Martin Luther King Jr gave an address there in 1958. The building's decline in the 1960s and subsequent demolition left the site largely forgotten.

== See also ==
- 1932 Prohibition National Convention
- 1951 Prohibition National Convention
- List of destroyed heritage of the United States
