= 1932 Prohibition National Convention =

American political convention

- 1932 presidential election

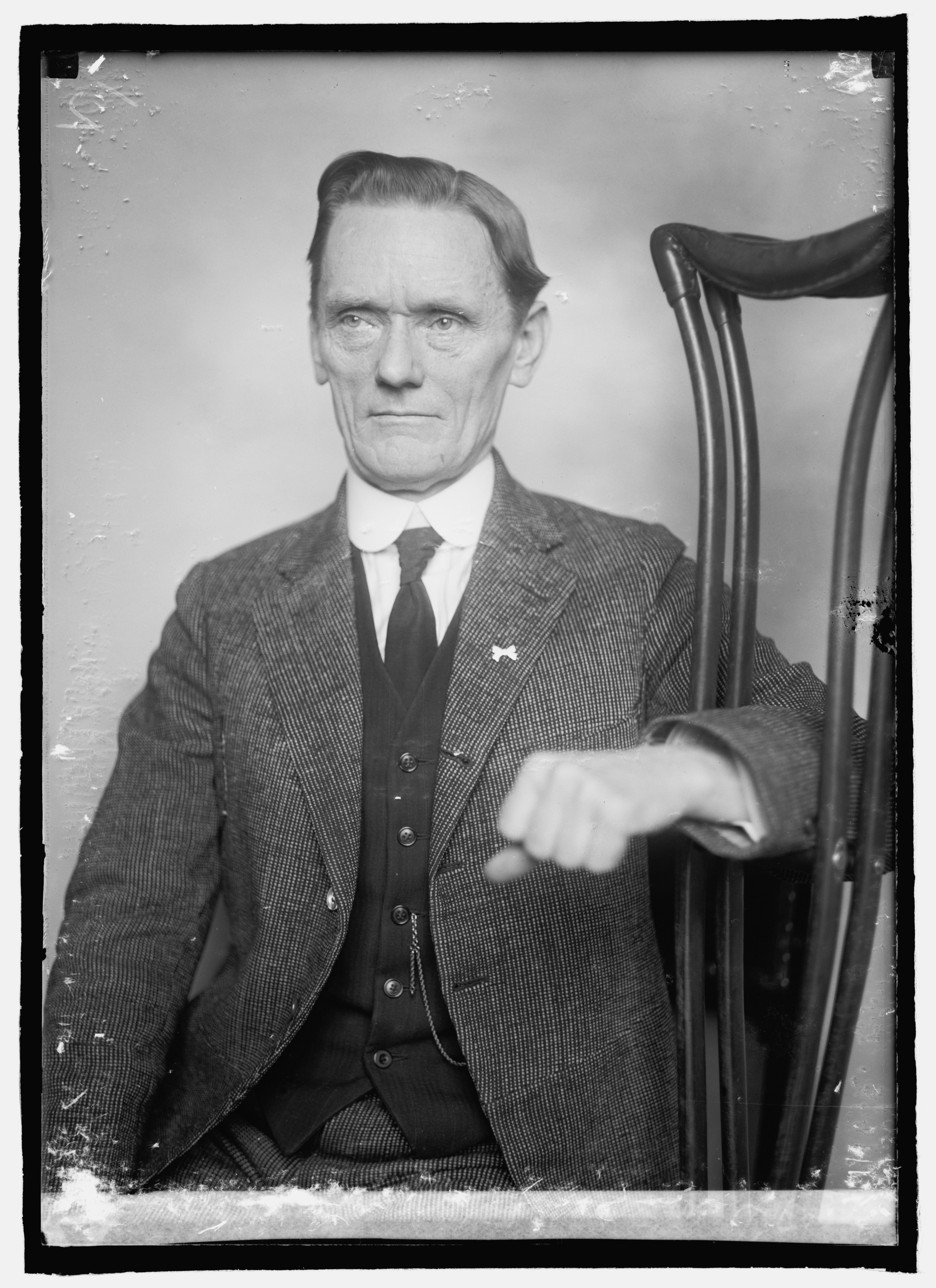
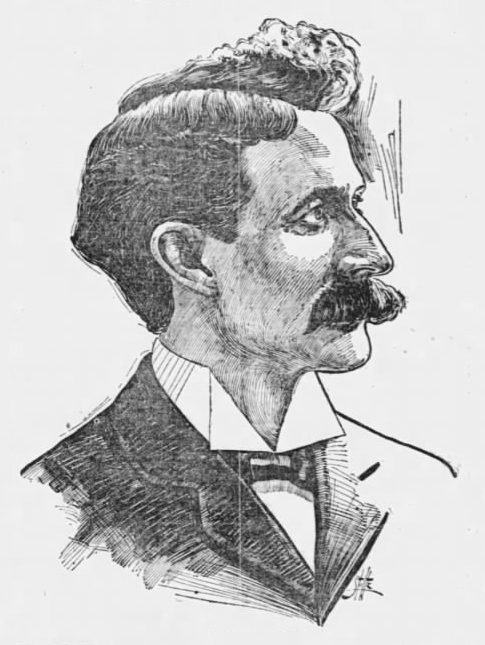
- Nominees (Upshaw & Regan)

Convention
- Date(s): July 5–7, 1932
- City: Indianapolis, Indiana
- Venue: Cadle Tabernacle
- Keynote speaker: Clinton N. Howard

Candidates
- Presidential nominee: William David Upshaw of Georgia
- Vice-presidential nominee: Frank Stewart Regan of Illinois

Voting
- Total delegates: 300

The 1932 Prohibition National Convention was held at the Cadle Tabernacle in Indianapolis, Indiana, on July 5–7, 1932. The convention nominated William David Upshaw for president (after William Edgar Borah declined the nomination) and Frank Stewart Regan for vice president.

== Logistics ==
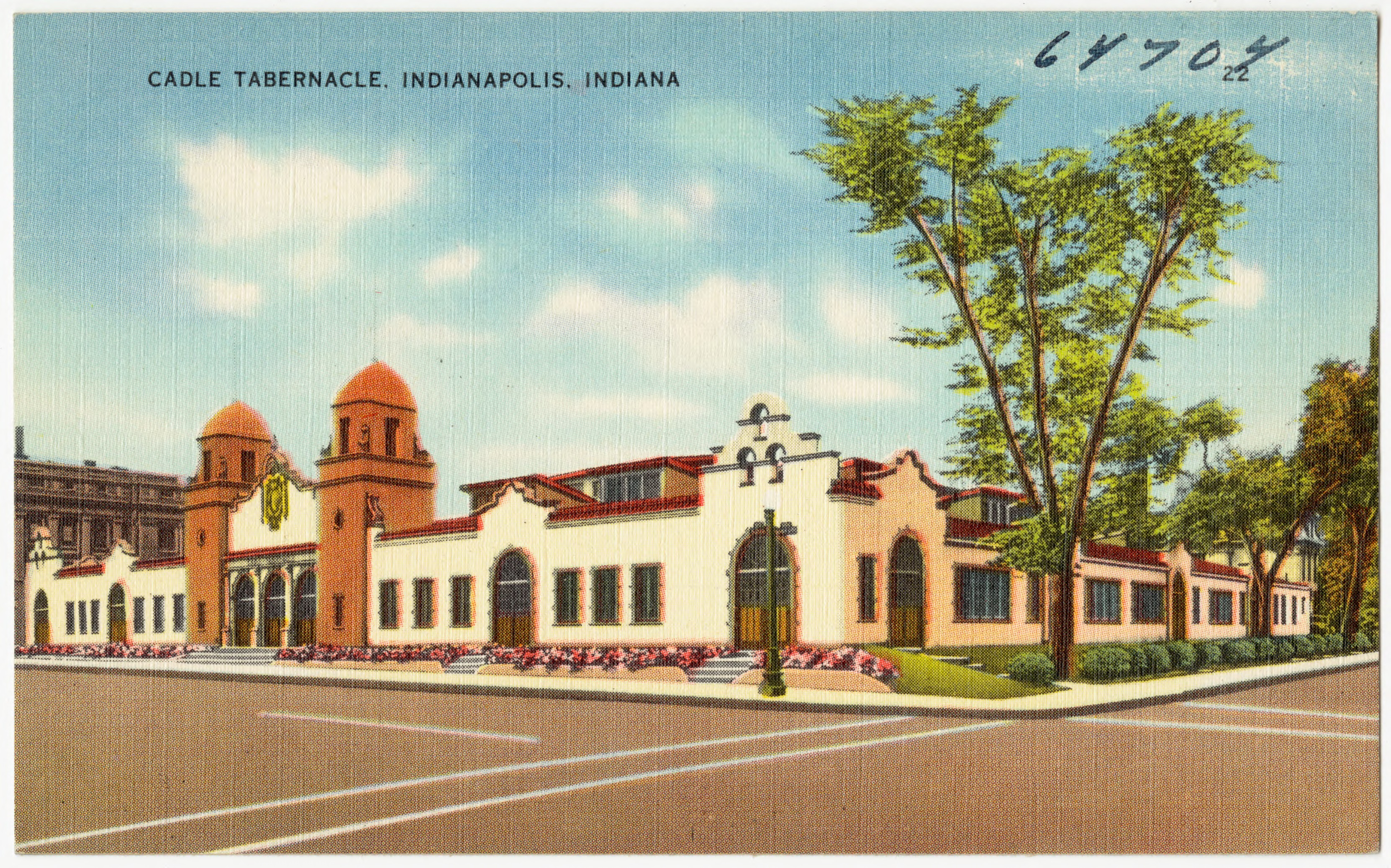
Postcard of the Cadle Tabernacle, the convention venue

The convention was held at the Cadle Tabernacle in Indianapolis, Indiana, on July 5–7, 1932.

300 delegates attended the convention. As the Prohibition Party declined in size, it held its conventions in progressively less grand venues. The 1932 venue was described by Time magazine as having "low gloomy rafters".

Indianapolis was a regular location for the party's conventions. It had been the site of the 1888 and 1904 conventions, and would later be the site of the 1943 and 1951 conventions.

== Proceedings ==
Time observed,

Like the [conventions of the] Republicans and Democrats in the Chicago Stadium, the Dry (Note: "Dry" referred to someone supportive of prohibition, while "Wet" referred to someone opposed to it) delegates had a keynote speech, organ music, long distance telephone calls to Washington, State placards, demonstrations, prayers, candidates for the Presidency, roll calls. Unlike the two major parties they adopted an uncompromisingly Dry platform and nominated for the White House a man who promptly promised to withdraw if a better candidate could be found.

Clinton N. Howard delivered the convention's keynote speech.

== Presidential nomination ==
The convention initially attempted to nominate Senator William Edgar Borah of Idaho, a Republican who had publicly refused to support President Herbert Hoover's bid for re-election due to the liquor plank in the Republican Party's 1932 platform. Ethel Hubler, a California delegate, formally put forth Senator Borah as a candidate for the party's presidential balloting, hailing him as, "a radical Dry at all times...a man whose election would sound the death-knell of the liquor traffic." The nomination was seconded by James Cannon Jr., a fellow delegate from California (and the son of the notable bishop James Cannon Jr.) The convention then nominated Boorah. Party Chairman David Leigh Colvin reached out to Borah by telephone to notify him, only for Boorah to decline interest in receiving the Prohibition Party nomination for president, telling Colvin, "While I appreciate the compliment, I don't believe the convention should make such a nomination. Such a call [for me to run for president], if at all, should result from a great uprising of the people in another convention to be called by the united moral forces of the nation."

With Boorah declining the nomination, the convention then nominated William David Upshaw, a former congressman from Georgia. Boorah accepted the nomination, but indicated he would drop out in difference if Boorah or another "outstanding figure" were to enter the election on a third-party pro-prohibition ticket.

== Vice presidential nomination ==
Frank Stewart Regan of Illinois was nominated for vice president.
