= Van Buren Township, Kosciusko County, Indiana =

Van Buren Township
- Township
- Coordinates: 41°23′30″N 85°49′32″W
- Country: United States
- State: Indiana
- County: Kosciusko

Government
  - Type: Indiana township

Area
  - Total: 36.47 sq mi (94.5 km^{2})
  - Land: 35.23 sq mi (91.2 km^{2})
  - Water: 1.24 sq mi (3.2 km^{2})
- Elevation: 843 ft (257 m)

Population (2020)
  - Total: 4,311
  - Density: 118.3/sq mi (45.7/km^{2})
- Time zone: UTC-5 (Eastern (EST))
  - Summer (DST): UTC-4 (EDT)
- FIPS code: 18-78488
- GNIS feature ID: 453947

Historical population
Census	Pop.	Note	%±
1920	1,719		—
1930	1,701		−1.0%
1940	1,765		3.8%
1950	1,863		5.6%
1960	2,341		25.7%
1970	2,665		13.8%
1980	3,118		17.0%
1990	3,660		17.4%
2000	4,013		9.6%
2010	4,168		3.9%
2020	4,311		3.4%
US Census:

Van Buren Township is one of seventeen townships in Kosciusko County, Indiana. As of the 2020 census, its population was 4,311 (up from 4,168 at 2010) and it contained 1,946 housing units.

Van Buren Township was organized in 1836.

== Geography ==
According to the 2010 census, the township has a total area of 36.47 square miles (94.5 km^{2}), of which 35.23 square miles (91.2 km^{2}) (or 96.60%) is land and 1.24 square miles (3.2 km^{2}) (or 3.40%) is water.

=== Cities and towns ===
- Milford

=== Unincorporated towns ===
- DeFries Landing at 41.3658801°N 85.7680451°W

(This list is based on USGS data and may include former settlements.)

== Education ==
Van Buren Township residents may obtain a free library card from the Milford Public Library.
