= Enoch A. Holtwick =

American educator (1881–1972)

- Born: Enock Arden Holtwick; January 3, 1881; Montgomery County, Missouri, U.S.
- Died: March 29, 1972 (aged 91); Greenville, Illinois, U.S.
- Occupation: Educator
- Political party: Prohibition

Enoch Arden Holtwick (January 3, 1881 – March 29, 1972) was an American educator with a long record of actively supporting the temperance movement. He was the Prohibition Party nominee for Illinois State Treasurer in 1936; its nominee for U.S. Senator from Illinois in 1938, 1940, 1942, 1944, 1948 and 1950; its nominee for vice-president of the United States in 1952; and its nominee for president in 1956.

Holtwick was born in Montgomery County, Missouri, and grew up near Rhineland, Missouri, where his family was active in the Free Methodist Church.

Holtwick moved to California, taught school, and served as president of Los Angeles Pacific Junior College from 1915 to 1918.

In 1919, he returned to the Midwest, and joined the faculty of Greenville College in Greenville, Illinois, where he taught history and political science until his retirement in 1951. Long after retirement he continued to give an annual lecture to the student body with a survey of current world events and issues.

Holtwick served as presiding officer during the party's national presidential nominating conventions in 1943, 1947, 1951, and 1955. At the latter two conventions, he was nominated for vice president in the 1952 election and for president in the 1956 election.

Holtwick died at Fair Oaks Nursing Home in Greenville, Illinois.

In Greenville, he is memorialized by the Enoch A. Holtwick Literary Award and Enoch A. Holtwick Hall, a residence building.

Party political offices
Preceded by Stuart Hamblen	Prohibition Party presidential candidate 1956 (lost)	Succeeded by Rutherford Decker
Preceded by Dale H. Learn	Prohibition Party vice presidential candidate 1952 (lost)	Succeeded by Edwin M. Cooper
