= Claude A. Watson =

American politician

Personal details
- Born: June 26, 1885 Manton, Michigan, U.S.
- Died: January 3, 1978 (aged 92) Los Angeles, California, U.S.
- Party: Prohibition
- Spouse: Maude L. Hagar
- Children: 3
- Parents: Joseph A. Watson (father); Emma Jane Dove (mother)
- Education: Alma College; Greenville University

Claude A. Watson (June 26, 1885 – January 3, 1978) was an American politician, lawyer, businessman, and minister from Hermon, California, who was nationally active in the temperance movement and the Prohibition Party. He is currently the most recent presidential nominee of the Prohibition party to have received over 100,000 votes.

A certified pilot, Watson was the first American presidential candidate in history to fly his own airplane, and flew over 16,000 miles campaigning.

== Life ==
On June 26, 1885, Claude A. Watson was born near Manton, Michigan to Reverend Joseph A. Watson and Emma Jane Dove. On December 27, 1911, he married Maude L. Hagar and would later have three children with her.

In 1928, he was admitted to the legal bar in California, with a license to practice before the Federal and US Supreme courts after moving there and established a law practice. In 1936, he was selected as the Prohibition Party vice presidential nominee, was the keynote speaker at the party's 1940 convention, and served as its presidential nominee in 1944 and 1948. He also served as a Free Methodist pastor and conference superintendent. Watson ran for attorney general of California in 1938, 1942, and 1950 and ran for Los Angeles District Attorney in 1952.

On January 3, 1978, he died in Los Angeles at age 92.

== See also ==
- Temperance organizations
- 1936 Prohibition National Convention
- 1943 Prohibition National Convention
- 1947 Prohibition National Convention
