= Milford, Kosciusko County, Indiana =

Milford
- Town
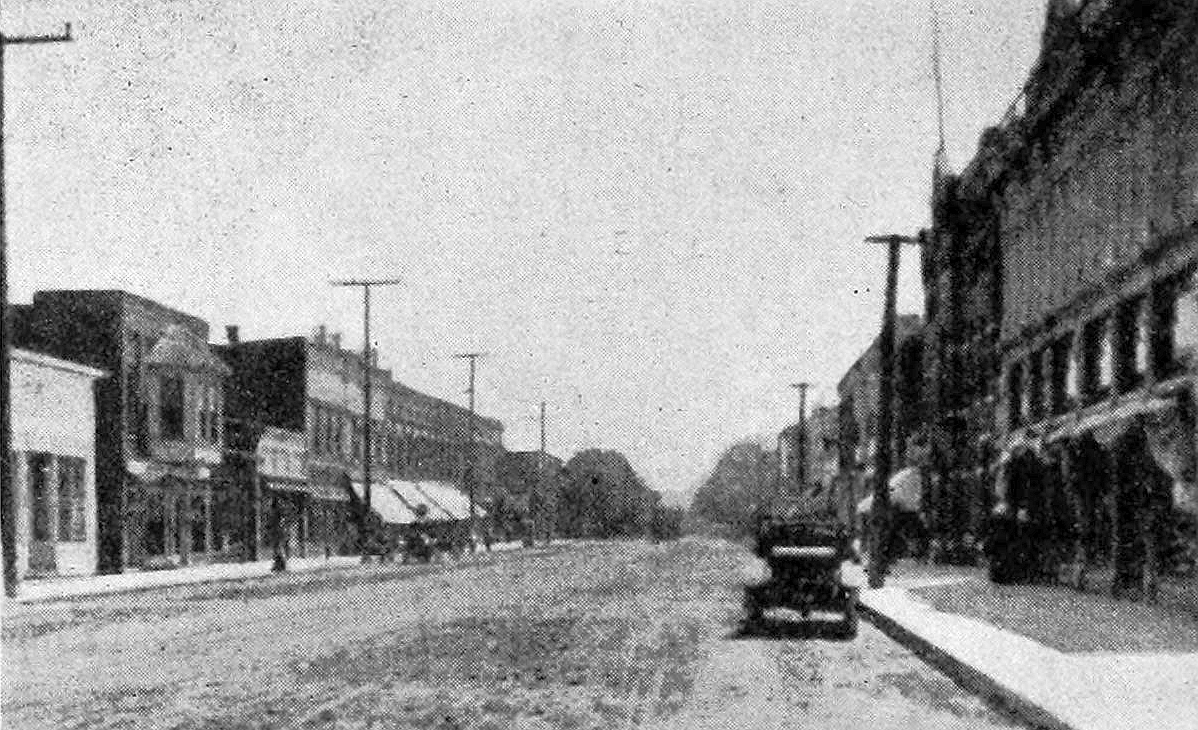
- Looking south on Main Street, 1919

- Seal

- Location of Milford in Kosciusko County, Indiana.
- Coordinates: 41°24′51″N 85°50′41″W
- Country: United States
- State: Indiana
- County: Kosciusko
- Township: Van Buren

Area
  - Total: 1.47 sq mi (3.82 km^{2})
  - Land: 1.45 sq mi (3.76 km^{2})
  - Water: 0.023 sq mi (0.06 km^{2})
- Elevation: 833 ft (254 m)

Population (2020)
  - Total: 1,614
  - Density: 1,111.3/sq mi (429.08/km^{2})
- Time zone: UTC-5 (Eastern (EST))
  - Summer (DST): UTC-4 (EDT)
- ZIP code: 46542
- Area code: 574
- FIPS code: 18-49320
- GNIS feature ID: 2396763
- Website: www.milford-indiana.org

Milford is a town in Van Buren Township, Kosciusko County, in the U.S. state of Indiana. The population was 1,614 at the 2020 census.

== History ==
Milford was laid out by Judge Aaron M. Perine on April 10, 1836, who had settled the area with his family in 1834. It was named for a mill which stood near a ford. The post office at Milford has been in operation since 1837. In 1880, Milford was officially incorporated as a town.

== Geography ==
According to the 2010 census, Milford has a total area of 1.12 square miles (2.90 km^{2}), of which 1.1 square miles (2.85 km^{2}) (or 98.21%) is land and 0.02 square miles (0.05 km^{2}) (or 1.79%) is water.

== Demographics ==
Historical population
| Census | Pop. | Note | %± |
|---|---|---|---|
| 1860 | 209 | | — |
| 1870 | 432 | | 106.7% |
| 1880 | 492 | | 13.9% |
| 1890 | 677 | | 37.6% |
| 1900 | 905 | | 33.7% |
| 1910 | 814 | | −10.1% |
| 1920 | 811 | | −0.4% |
| 1930 | 869 | | 7.2% |
| 1940 | 901 | | 3.7% |
| 1950 | 952 | | 5.7% |
| 1960 | 1,167 | | 22.6% |
| 1970 | 1,264 | | 8.3% |
| 1980 | 1,153 | | −8.8% |
| 1990 | 1,388 | | 20.4% |
| 2000 | 1,550 | | 11.7% |
| 2010 | 1,562 | | 0.8% |
| 2020 | 1,614 | | 3.3% |
U.S. Decennial Census

=== 2010 census ===
As of the census of 2010, there were 1,562 people, 613 households, and 406 families living in the town. The population density was 1,420.0 inhabitants per square mile (548.3/km^{2}). There were 667 housing units at an average density of 606.4 per square mile (234.1/km^{2}). The racial makeup of the town was 88.3% White, 0.7% African American, 0.3% Native American, 0.3% Asian, 8.8% from other races, and 1.7% from two or more races. Hispanic or Latino of any race were 12.4% of the population.

There were 613 households, of which 35.1% had children under the age of 18 living with them, 46.7% were married couples living together, 13.1% had a female householder with no husband present, 6.5% had a male householder with no wife present, and 33.8% were non-families. 29.4% of all households were made up of individuals, and 13.3% had someone living alone who was 65 years of age or older. The average household size was 2.47 and the average family size was 3.06.

The median age in the town was 36.9 years. 27.1% of residents were under the age of 18; 7.9% were between the ages of 18 and 24; 25.8% were from 25 to 44; 23% were from 45 to 64; and 16.3% were 65 years of age or older. The gender makeup of the town was 49.2% male and 50.8% female.

=== 2000 census ===
As of the census of 2000, there were 1,550 people, 590 households, and 402 families living in the town. The population density was 1,436.8 inhabitants per square mile (554.8/km^{2}). There were 626 housing units at an average density of 580.3 per square mile (224.1/km^{2}). The racial makeup of the town was 91.61% White, 0.84% African American, 0.13% Native American, 0.26% Asian, 5.29% from other races, and 1.87% from two or more races. Hispanic or Latino of any race were 11.16% of the population.

There were 590 households, out of which 33.9% had children under the age of 18 living with them, 54.1% were married couples living together, 9.5% had a female householder with no husband present, and 31.7% were non-families. 28.3% of all households were made up of individuals, and 13.6% had someone living alone who was 65 years of age or older. The average household size was 2.53 and the average family size was 3.11.

In the town, the population was spread out, with 27.2% under the age of 18, 8.3% from 18 to 24, 27.7% from 25 to 44, 19.5% from 45 to 64, and 17.4% who were 65 years of age or older. The median age was 36 years. For every 100 females, there were 86.5 males. For every 100 females age 18 and over, there were 85.2 males.

The median income for a household in the town was $36,458, and the median income for a family was $43,958. Males had a median income of $32,898 versus $24,107 for females. The per capita income for the town was $17,247. About 2.4% of families and 4.0% of the population were below the poverty line, including 2.3% of those under age 18 and 6.4% of those age 65 or over.

== Economy ==
The industry of Milford is based primarily on manufacturing and agriculture. Milford is home to agricultural equipment manufacturer CTB, Inc., printer/publisher The Papers Incorporated, whose largest publication is Auto & RV, which publishes books available for Indiana, Michigan, Illinois, Ohio, Kentucky, Wisconsin and Tennessee, and Maple Leaf Farms, the largest White Peking duck producer in North America.

== Education ==
Milford is home to:

- Gravelton Parochial School (grades 1–8)
- Maple Grove Amish School (grades 1–8)
- West Hastings (grades 1–8)
- Milford Elementary and Middle School (grades K-8) part of the Wawasee Community School Corporation (WCSC)

The town has a lending library, the Milford Public Library.
