= Whitehall, New York =

Whitehall
- Town
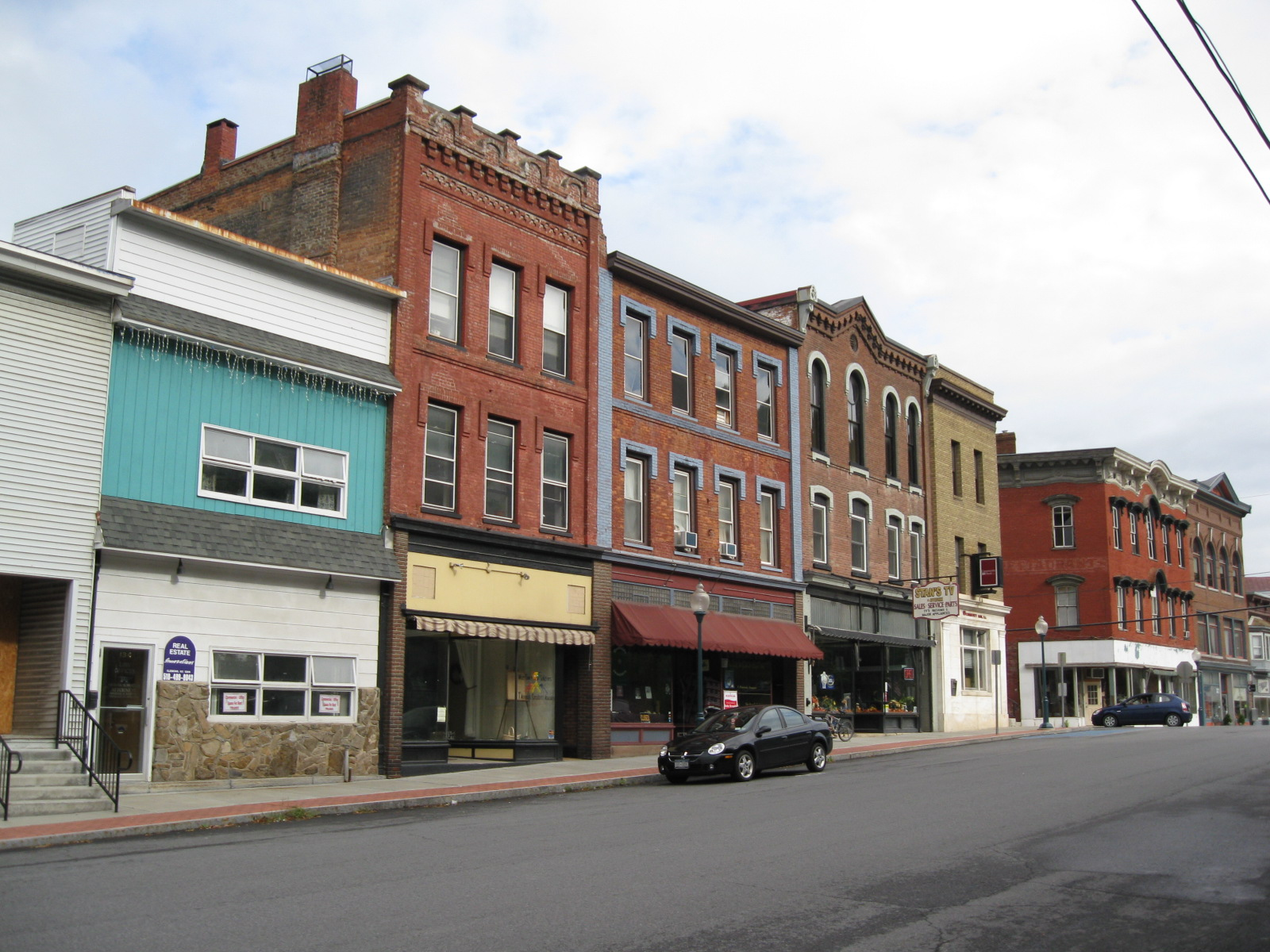
- Main Street Historic District
- Nickname: The Smallest Town In New York
- Location in Washington County and the state of New York.
- Coordinates: 43°33′N 73°24′W
- Country: United States
- State: New York
- County: Washington

Area
  - Total: 58.82 sq mi (152.35 km^{2})
  - Land: 57.16 sq mi (148.04 km^{2})
  - Water: 1.66 sq mi (4.31 km^{2})

Population (2020)
  - Total: 4,023
  - Density: 69.1/sq mi (26.67/km^{2})
- Area code: 518
- FIPS code: 36-115-81633

Whitehall is a town in Washington County, New York, United States. It is part of the Glens Falls Metropolitan Statistical Area. The town population was 4,023 at the 2020 census.

The Town of Whitehall contains a village also named Whitehall.

== History ==
During the late 17th century, the area was a staging ground for raids between English and French colonies. Whitehall was first called "Skenesborough" in 1759 when it was settled by a land grant to a British officer, Philip Skene (1725 - after 1785), who later returned to Britain, and who was subsequently declared an enemy of the State of New York for his land dealings. During the French and Indian War, the town was one of two major routes connecting the British and French Colonies.

During the American Revolution, the village, Skenesborough, was captured by American forces on May 9, 1775. Benedict Arnold under Philip Schuyler built a fleet of vessels to confront British forces at Valcour Island (thus the claim that this is the birthplace of the U.S. Navy). The surviving American vessels returned here to be destroyed in order to keep them from falling into enemy hands. The next year John Burgoyne led his forces through this area en route to the Battle of Saratoga. After the war, the town's name was changed to Whitehall.

During the War of 1812 the area was used to build ships to battle British forces on Lake Champlain, culminating at the Battle of Plattsburgh. In 1823, the Champlain Canal was completed to Whitehall. The Rensselaer and Saratoga Railroad was extended to Whitehall in 1848. During the second half of the 19th Century, the silk industry grew important in the town.

Due to the actions in 1775 and 1776, the legislature of the State of New York in 1960 declared Whitehall to be the birthplace of the United States Navy.

== Geography ==
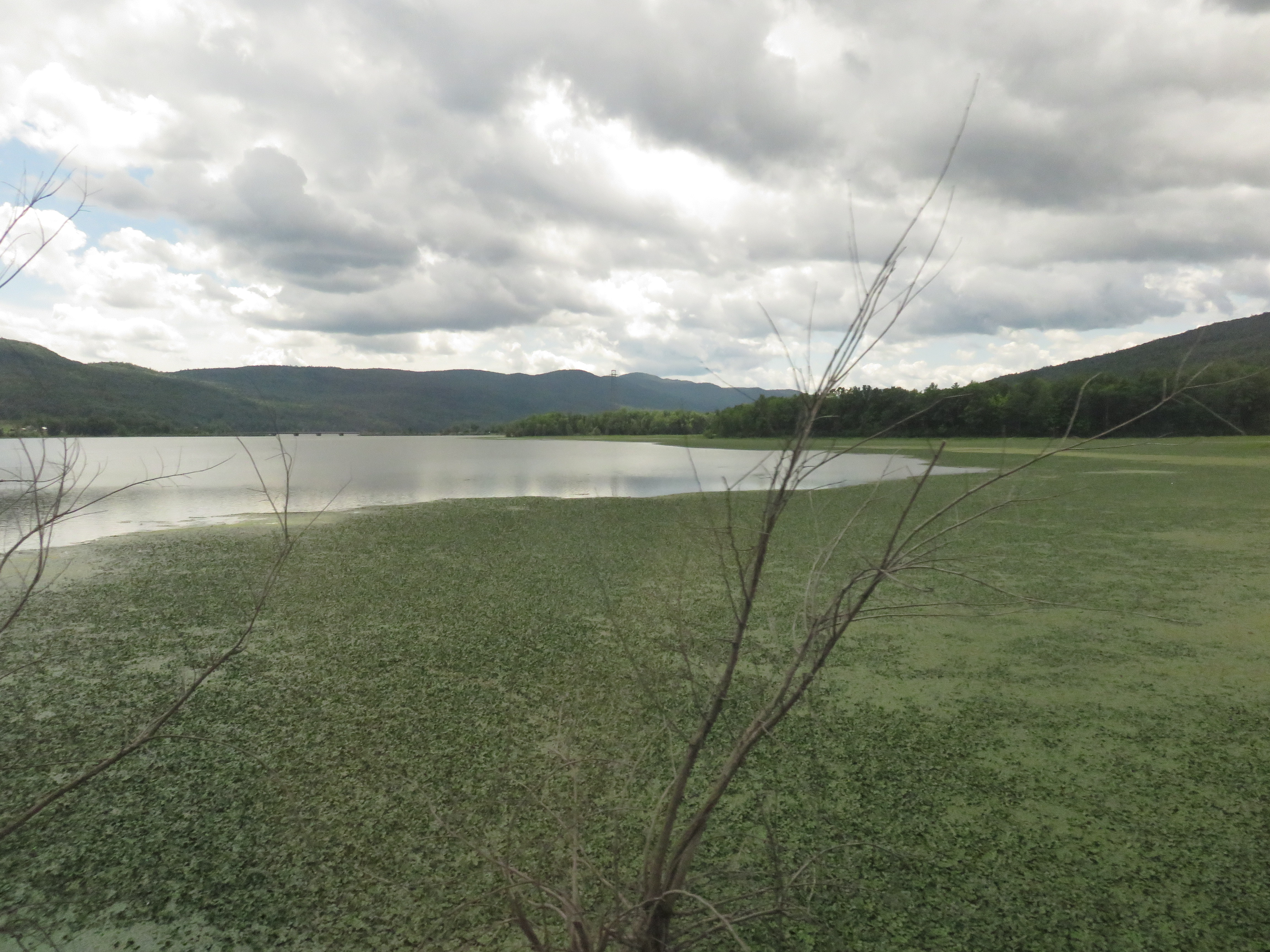
The South Bay of Lake Champlain near Whitehall

According to the United States Census Bureau, the town has a total area of 58.8 sq mi (152 km^{2}), of which 57.6 sq mi (149 km^{2}) is land and 1.1 sq mi (2.8 km^{2}) (1.94%) is water.

The northern town line is the border of Vermont. The Champlain Canal passes through the western section of the town. The South Bay of Lake Champlain forms part of the western town line.

Conjoined U. S. Route 4 and NY Route 22 form a north–south highway through Whitehall. US-4 turns east at Whitehall village, where NY-22 turns west to the Town of Dresden.

=== Climate ===
Climate data for Whitehall, New York (1991–2020 normals, extremes 1937–present)
Month	Jan	Feb	Mar	Apr	May	Jun	Jul	Aug	Sep	Oct	Nov	Dec	Year
Record high °F (°C)	64 (18)	67 (19)	84 (29)	94 (34)	94 (34)	102 (39)	103 (39)	101 (38)	99 (37)	87 (31)	79 (26)	68 (20)	103 (39)
Mean daily maximum °F (°C)	30.3 (−0.9)	34.0 (1.1)	43.1 (6.2)	57.9 (14.4)	71.0 (21.7)	79.1 (26.2)	83.5 (28.6)	81.7 (27.6)	73.9 (23.3)	60.7 (15.9)	47.2 (8.4)	35.5 (1.9)	58.2 (14.6)
Daily mean °F (°C)	21.2 (−6.0)	23.2 (−4.9)	32.8 (0.4)	46.6 (8.1)	59.1 (15.1)	67.8 (19.9)	72.4 (22.4)	70.8 (21.6)	62.8 (17.1)	50.7 (10.4)	38.9 (3.8)	28.0 (−2.2)	47.9 (8.8)
Mean daily minimum °F (°C)	12.1 (−11.1)	12.5 (−10.8)	22.4 (−5.3)	35.2 (1.8)	47.2 (8.4)	56.5 (13.6)	61.3 (16.3)	59.9 (15.5)	51.8 (11.0)	40.7 (4.8)	30.7 (−0.7)	20.5 (−6.4)	37.6 (3.1)
Record low °F (°C)	−36 (−38)	−38 (−39)	−27 (−33)	7 (−14)	18 (−8)	31 (−1)	43 (6)	37 (3)	26 (−3)	8 (−13)	−2 (−19)	−28 (−33)	−38 (−39)
Average precipitation inches (mm)	3.00 (76)	2.57 (65)	2.99 (76)	3.30 (84)	3.33 (85)	4.37 (111)	4.36 (111)	4.45 (113)	3.58 (91)	4.05 (103)	2.98 (76)	3.57 (91)	42.55 (1,081)
Average precipitation days (≥ 0.01 in)	11.3	8.4	10.4	10.9	13.8	12.3	11.9	11.0	9.7	12.7	10.7	11.5	134.6
Source: NOAA

== Demographics ==
Historical population
Census	Pop.	Note	%±
1820	2,341		—
1830	2,888		23.4%
1840	3,813		32.0%
1850	4,726		23.9%
1860	4,862		2.9%
1870	4,464		−8.2%
1880	5,347		19.8%
1890	5,402		1.0%
1900	5,295		−2.0%
1910	5,869		10.8%
1920	6,008		2.4%
1930	5,975		−0.5%
1940	5,670		−5.1%
1950	5,256		−7.3%
1960	4,757		−9.5%
1970	4,794		0.8%
1980	4,427		−7.7%
1990	4,409		−0.4%
2000	4,035		−8.5%
2010	4,042		0.2%
2020	4,023		−0.5%
U.S. Decennial Census

As of the census of 2000, there were 4,035 people, 1,611 households, and 1,098 families residing in the town. The population density was 70.0 inhabitants per square mile (27.0/km^{2}). There were 1,877 housing units at an average density of 32.6 per square mile (12.6/km^{2}). The racial makeup of the town was 97.99% White, 0.20% Black or African American, 0.25% Native American, 0.27% Asian, 0.55% from other races, and 0.74% from two or more races. Hispanic or Latino of any race were 1.21% of the population.

There were 1,611 households, out of which 31.5% had children under the age of 18 living with them, 52.1% were married couples living together, 10.9% had a female householder with no husband present, and 31.8% were non-families. 26.8% of all households were made up of individuals, and 13.5% had someone living alone who was 65 years of age or older. The average household size was 2.50 and the average family size was 3.03.

In the town, the population was spread out, with 25.7% under the age of 18, 8.1% from 18 to 24, 27.2% from 25 to 44, 23.3% from 45 to 64, and 15.8% who were 65 years of age or older. The median age was 38 years. For every 100 females, there were 92.7 males. For every 100 females age 18 and over, there were 89.9 males.

The median income for a household in the town was $35,734, and the median income for a family was $43,590. Males had a median income of $35,365 versus $20,861 for females. The per capita income for the town was $16,831. About 10.9% of families and 12.1% of the population were below the poverty line, including 17.6% of those under age 18 and 7.6% of those age 65 or over.

== Communities and locations in the town ==
=== Communities ===
- East Bay Wildlife Management Area – A conservation area northeast of Whitehall village
- East Whitehall – A hamlet by the eastern town line at County Roads 18 and 21.

The Home Farm was listed on the National Register of Historic Places in 2008

- Grays Corner – A hamlet southeast of Whitehall village on County Road 12
- Whitehall – The Village of Whitehall, located at the junction of NY-22 and US-4 in the northern part of the town

=== Geographical locations ===
- Brown Pond – A lake in the southeastern part of Whitehall
- Castle Creek – A tributary of the Mettawee River
- Death Rock – An elevation north of West Mountain
- Dolph Pond – A lake in the southwestern section of Whitehall
- Mettawee River – A stream flowing into the Champlain Canal
- Mud Brook – A stream flowing into the Champlain Canal, south of Whitehall village
- Ore Bed Hill – An elevation northeast of Grays Corner
- Ravine (rjw): A series of three rising intervales running on a line along the east side of Skene Mountain and running between current Rte. 4 and the eastern end of North Williams Street
- Tub Mountain – An elevation southwest of Grays Corner
- Warner Hill – An elevation north of Whitehall village
- West Mountain – An elevation near South Bay
- Wood Creek – A creek used to define the course of the Champlain Canal

== Notable people ==
- Robert Bartholomew, medical sociologist and journalist
- Codie Bascue, An Olympic bobsledder who participated in the 2018 PyeongChang Winter Olympics for Team USA.
- William Wallace Smith Bliss, United States Army officer and mathematician, born in Whitehall.
- Henry G. Burleigh, United States representative from New York
- Joseph H. Potter, New York State Supreme Court judge and owner/builder of the original "castle" built on the north end of Skene Mountain overlooking the village of Whitehall. It was built and called Mountain Terrace originally but it is now known as Skene Manor even though it was built in 1874 long after the influence of Philip Skene. He was the father of Admiral William P. Potter.
- William P. Potter, rear admiral in the U.S. Navy
- Solomon L. Spink, non-voting United States representative from the Dakota Territory, 1869-1871

=== See also ===
- Saratoga Campaign, War of 1812
