= USS Liberty (1775) =

History

United States
- Name: Liberty
- Builder: Lake Champlain at Skenesborough, New York
- Acquired: May 11, 1775
- Out of service: 1777
- Fate: Destroyed summer 1777

General characteristics
- Type: schooner
- Sail plan: gaff-rigged
- Armament: 4 × 4-pounder guns; 4 × 2-pounder guns

USS Liberty was an 8-gun schooner of the Continental Navy. She was originally the civilian vessel Katherine, built at Skenesboro, New York on Lake Champlain, for wealthy landowner and former British Army Captain Philip Skene. It was captured on May 11, 1775, during a raid on Skenesboro led by Capt. Samuel Herrick, an early action in the American Revolution. The Americans renamed her Liberty.

== Service history ==
Originally named Katherine, she was renamed Liberty to honor the patriot cause.

She sailed to Fort Ticonderoga on May 13, 1775, and filled out her crew. Later that day she got underway for Fort Crown Point where she arrived at sunset the following day. On May 16 she pushed on toward St. Jean, the British shipyard on the lake. North of Isle La Motte, the schooner was becalmed, but General Benedict Arnold with a party of 35 men pressed on in small boats. After rowing all night the raiders surprised the fort and captured the sloop George, mounting six 6-pounders.

Liberty and the prize, renamed Enterprise, gave the Americans undisputed control of the entire lake. The two ships, reinforced by new vessels built at Skenesboro, supported the Continental forces during the Canadian campaign, and prepared to defend the lake when the British assumed the offensive. During the Battle of Valcour Island, Liberty, away on a supply run, escaped the fate of most of Arnold's fleet, only to be destroyed the following summer as Burgoyne marched south.

== Bibliography ==
- DANFS (July 29, 2015). "Liberty I (Schooner)". Dictionary of American Naval Fighting Ships. Naval History and Heritage Command.
- Priolo, Gary P. (July 31, 2015). "Liberty (I)". NavSource.
