= Niagara Falls Armory =

- U.S. National Register of Historic Places
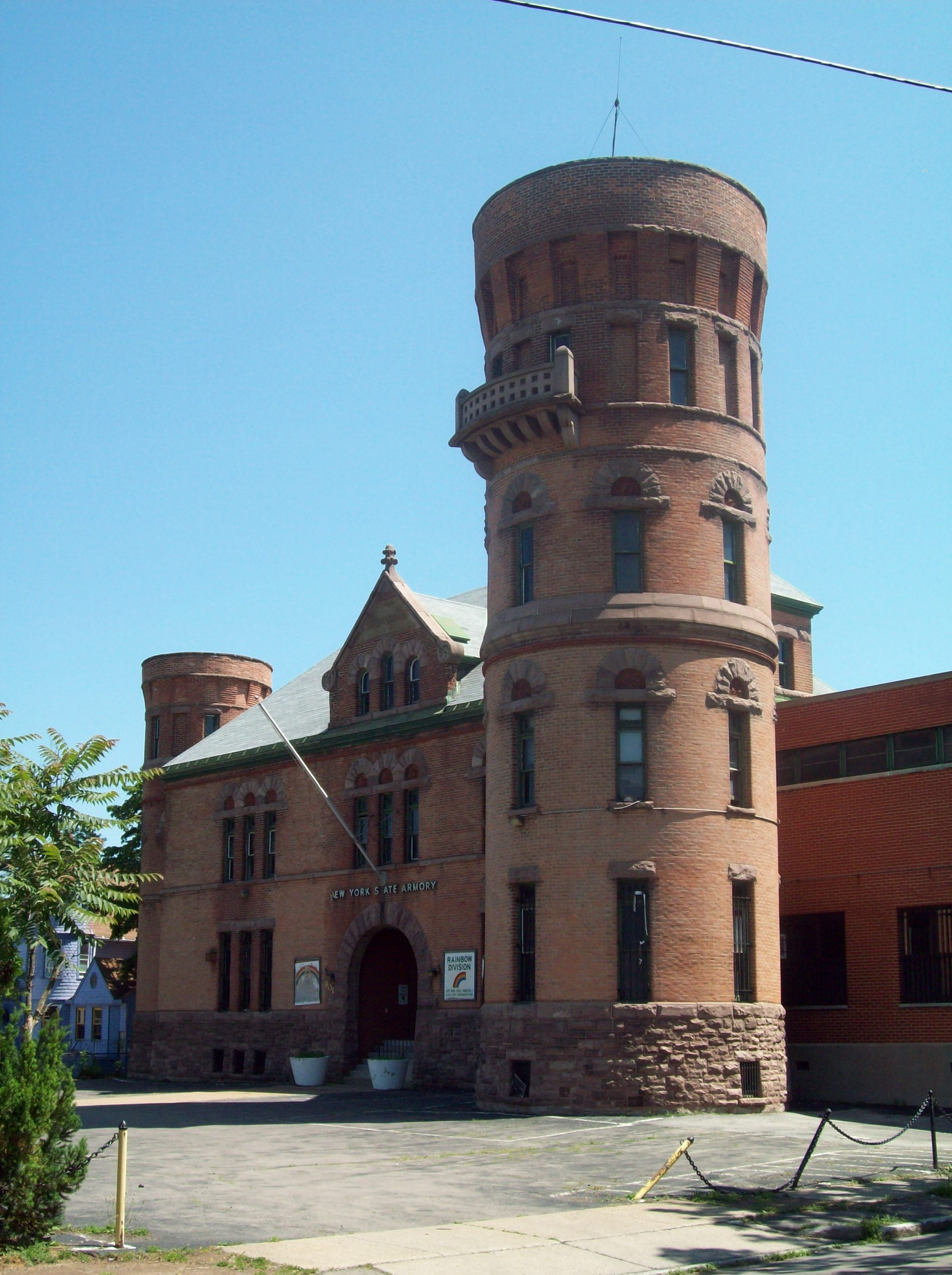
- Niagara Falls Armory, June 2009

- Location within New York Location within the United States
- Location: 901 Main St., Niagara Falls, New York
- Coordinates: 43°5′51″N 79°3′14″W
- Built: 1895
- Architect: Isaac Perry
- Architectural style: Late Victorian, castellated
- MPS: Army National Guard Armories in New York State MPS
- NRHP reference No.: 95000076
- Added to NRHP: March 2, 1995

Niagara Falls Armory is a historic New York National Guard armory located at Niagara Falls in Niagara County, New York. It consists of a two-story, hip-roofed administrative building with a one-story drill hall built in 1895 in a castellated, fortress-like style typical of that period. It was designed by architect Isaac G. Perry. The administration building features a 4 1/2-story round tower at the southwest corner, and a three-story round tower at the northwest corner.

It was listed on the National Register of Historic Places in 1995.

The building was the location of the 1936 Prohibition National Convention.
