= Isaac G. Perry =

American architect (1822–1904)

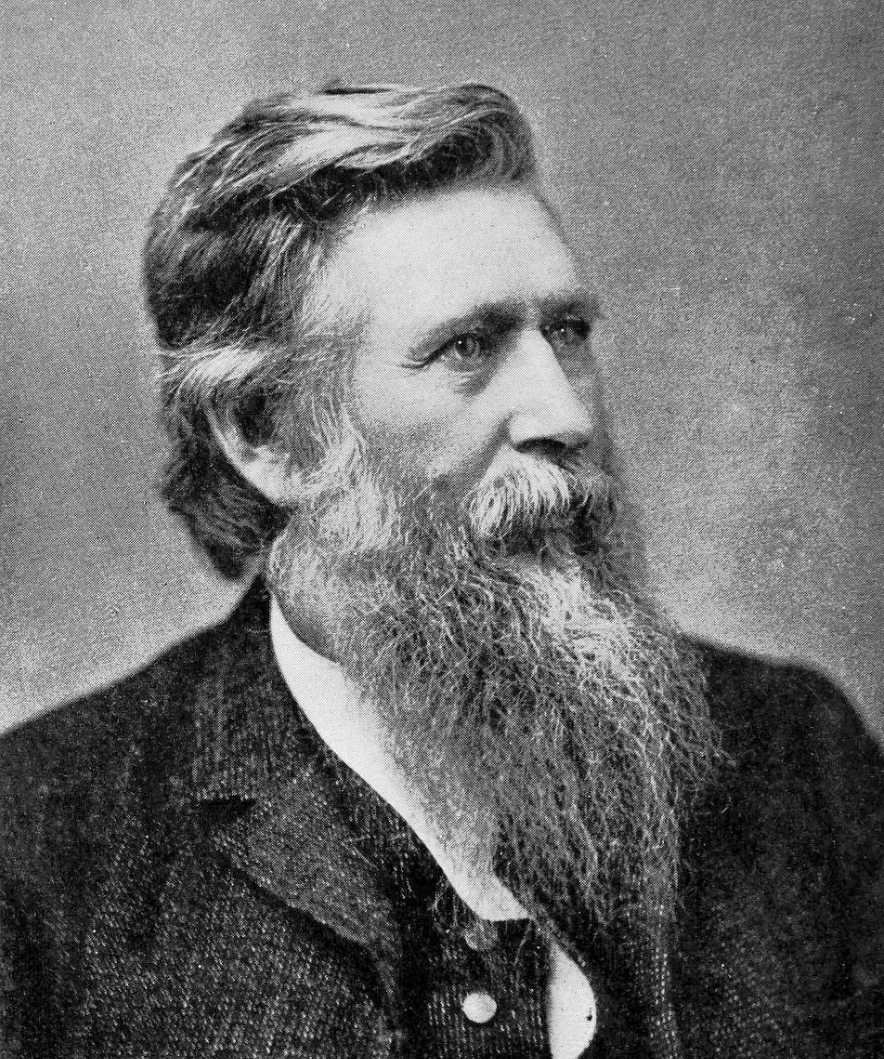
- Born: Isaac Gale Perry; March 24, 1822; Bennington, Vermont
- Died: March 17, 1904 (aged 81); Binghamton, New York
- Burial place: Spring Forest Cemetery, Binghamton
- Occupations: Architect, builder
- Spouse: Lucretia Gibson (m. 1848)

Isaac Gale Perry (March 24, 1822 – March 17, 1904) was a prolific New York State architect and builder. His works include New York State Inebriate Asylum, Phelps Mansion and the First National Bank of Oxford.

== Life and career ==
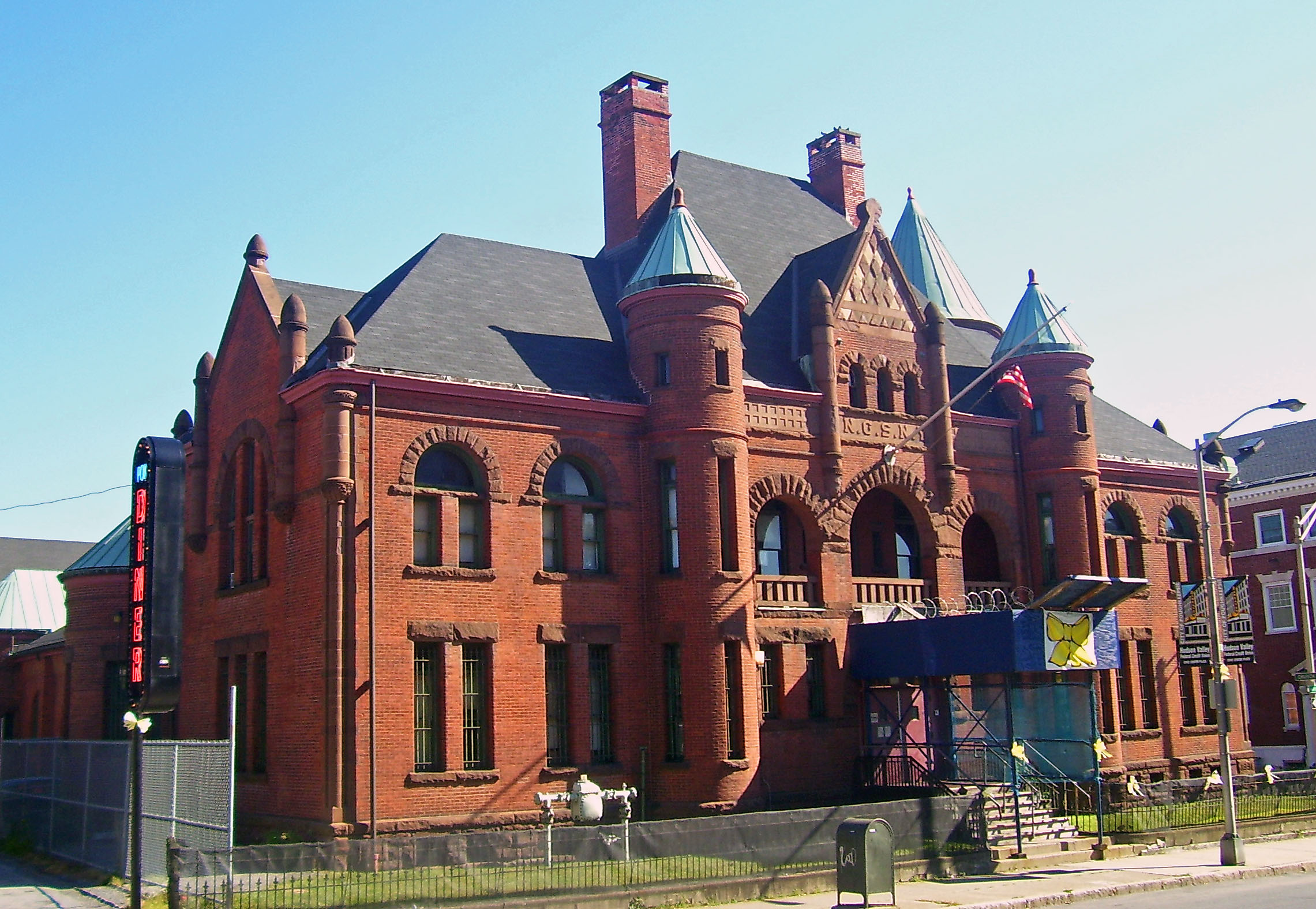
New York State Armory, Poughkeepsie, New York

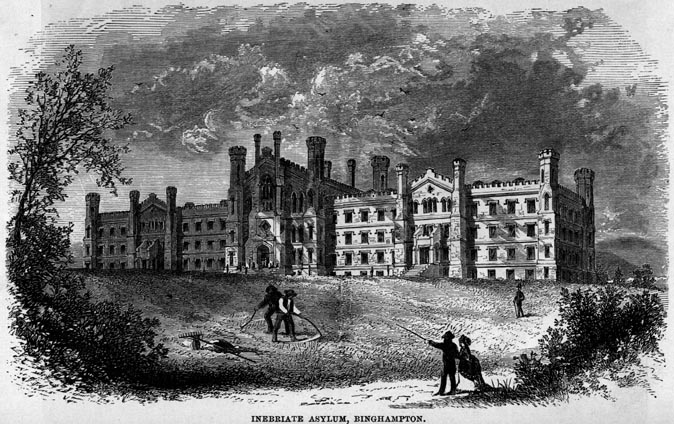
The New York State Inebriate Asylum

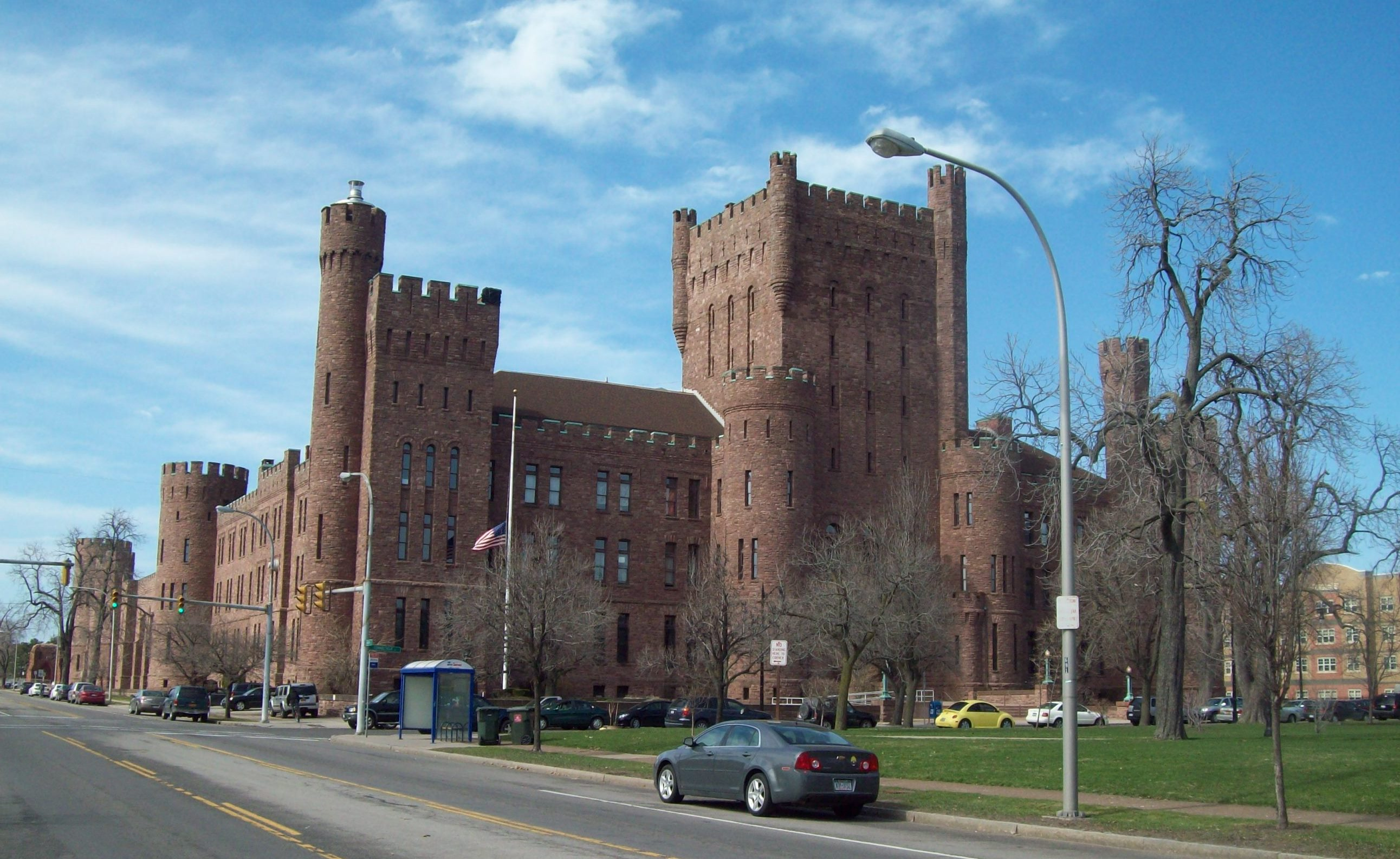
Connecticut Street Armory, Buffalo

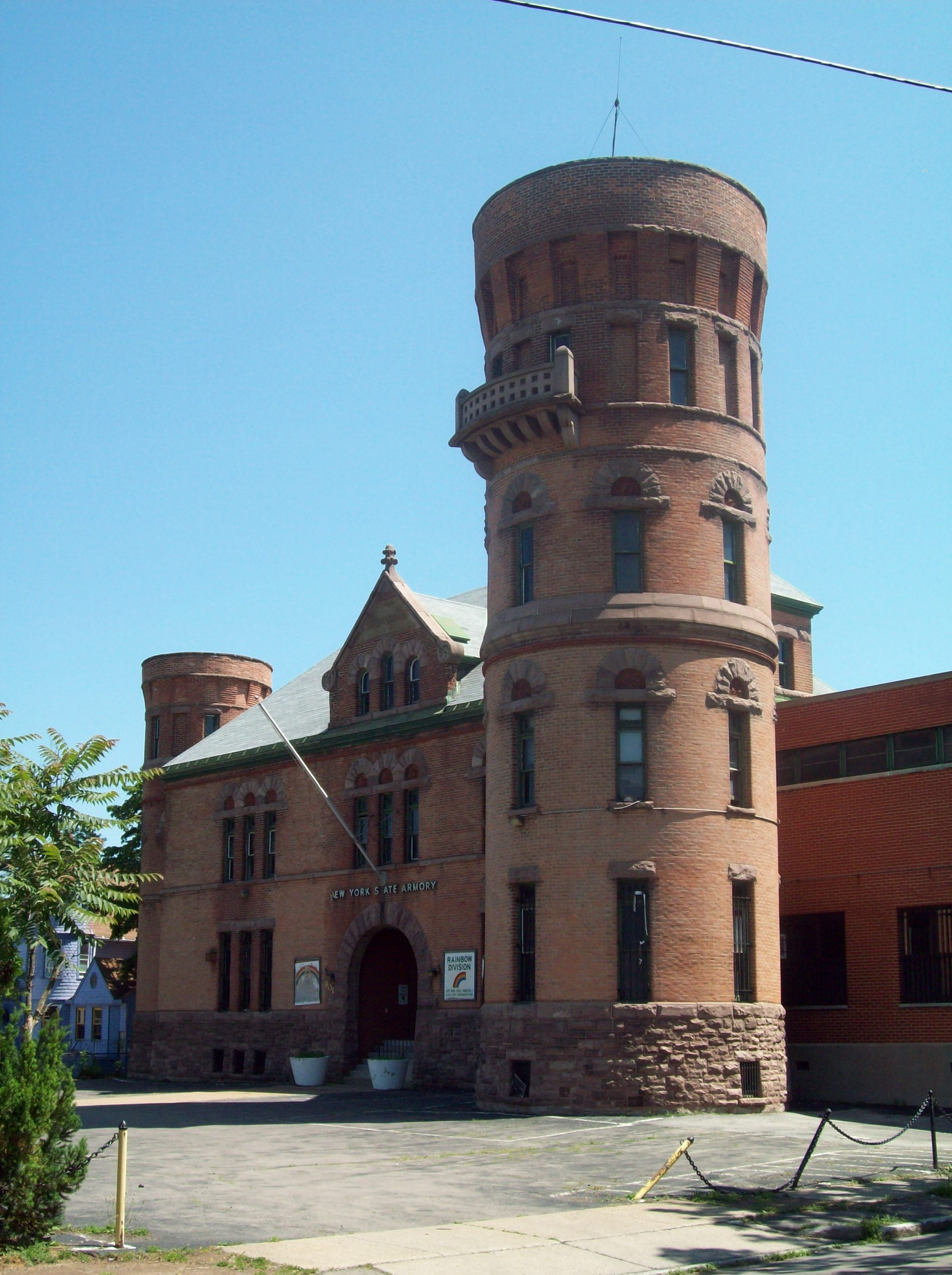
Niagara Falls Armory, Niagara Falls, New York

Isaac G. Perry was born in Bennington, Vermont, on March 24, 1822. He was raised and educated in Keeseville, New York, where his parents relocated in 1829. Between 1832 and 1854 he completed an apprenticeship and entered into partnership with his father, Seneca Perry, a shipwright turned carpenter. By 1847, Seneca Perry and Son were advertising locally as carpenter-joiners who undertook masonry work. The Perrys were well known for their skills at constructing spiral staircases, and the younger Perry, according to one biographer, earned a local reputation as an architect before leaving Keeseville.

Isaac Perry's architectural work in Keeseville is not well documented, but it is likely that the Emma Peale residence, called "Rembrandt Hall" (1851), a Gothic Revival-style Downingesque cottage that contains a spiral staircase by the Perrys, is an early design. By 1852, Perry relocated to New York to apprentice in the office of architect Thomas R. Jackson (1826–1901). Jackson, a native of England who migrated to the United States as a child, had risen to the position of head draftsman in the office of Richard Upjohn (1802–1872), one of New York's most prominent designers. The nature of his work with Jackson and the projects in which he collaborated, are not known.

Perry is considered to have been the first state architect in New York. In 1883, governor Grover Cleveland appointed him to oversee construction activities at the state capitol. Although his official title was "Capitol Commissioner", by the mid- to late 1880s Perry had oversight responsibility for all state government building programs and he was commonly referred to as the "State Architect". He retired in 1899, and the state legislature officially created the Office of the State Architect that same year.

== Buildings ==
=== The New York State Inebriate Asylum ===
The New York State Inebriate Asylum was the first major project designed and constructed by Perry, and marked the turning point in his architectural career. Perry's inexperience is evident in Turner's account of the building's design. Perry later recalled that he penciled the plans with the assistance of his wife, Lucretia Gibson Perry, whom he married in December 1848. He also appears to have been assisted by Peter Bonnett Wight (1838–1925), the head draftsman in Jackson's firm, but Wight's role in the project is not well documented.

=== Other buildings ===
Oxford, New York's First National Bank of Oxford building was constructed in 1894, and is now the Town and Village Hall and the Law offices of Roger Monaco. It was a Richardsonian Romanesque design. The architect was Isaac G. Perry, and the contractor and builder was James M. Wright, both of Binghamton, New York. The three-story building was constructed of brick with Oxford bluestone on the front, furnished by the F. G. Clarke Blue Stone Co. Not only are the stones shaped on the facade, but it is accented with two elaborate stone carvings just below the balcony. The carvings are of two faces, surrounded by oak leaves, that appear to be English "Green Men", the nature spirits of the forest. They were popular designs of the period.

The Phelps Mansion is a three-story brick-and-stone mansion located on Court Street in Binghamton, New York. It was built in 1870 as the private home of Sherman D. Phelps, a successful business man, banker, Republican Elector for Abraham Lincoln, and mayor of the City of Binghamton.

The Walton Armory at 139 Stockton Avenue in Walton, New York, was originally built for the Thirty Third Separate Company in 1896. As of 2014 it is undergoing restoration as the "Castle on the Delaware" with self-guided tours allowed during business hours.

Monday Afternoon Club, 191 Court St., Binghamton, built by Perry in the Victorian (Second Baroque) style.

A 21-room Queen Anne Victorian mansion (Gen. Edward F. Jones House) was built for Colonel General Edward F. Jones in 1867 was listed on the National Register of Historic Places. After the American Civil War, General Jones spared no expense while building this mansion, which has a three-story handcrafted wood grand staircase, a wrap around porch, irregularly shaped rooms, stained-glass windows, magnificent moldings and 11 marble, granite and hand-painted tile fireplaces. This mansion is one of the largest single family residences in the city of Binghamton. At the same time he designed and built the J. Stuart Wells House, listed on the National Register of Historic Places in 2009.

The Clerk's Building of the Orleans County Courthouse was constructed between 1882 and 1883 in the High Victorian Gothic style. It forms a part of the Orleans County Courthouse Historic District in the village of Albion. He also designed the Broome County Courthouse, built in 1897–1898.

The 31,000-square-foot (2,900 m^{2}) National Guard Armory in Saratoga Springs was built in 1889 and remodeled in 1902.

Perry was commissioned as the lead architect for the New York State Capitol from 1883 to its completion in 1899 and designed a dome for the capitol that was never built. He was the fifth and last architect of the project.

He also designed the First Congregational Church of Middletown (1872), Olean Armory (1890), Washington Avenue Armory (1890), Geneva Armory (1892), Niagara Falls Armory (1895), 18th Separate Company Armory (1895), Tonawanda (25th Separate Company) Armory (1896), Connecticut Street Armory (1899), and Whitehall Armory (1899), New York State Armory (Poughkeepsie), all listed on the National Register of Historic Places.

Perry also created the Spring Forest Cemetery's original entrance gates. He was asked to do so in 1903, and they were finished the next year. Isaac G. Perry died at his home in Binghamton on March 17, 1904, shortly after the completion of the gates. He was the first buried in the cemetery.
