= Whitehall Armory =

- U.S. National Register of Historic Places
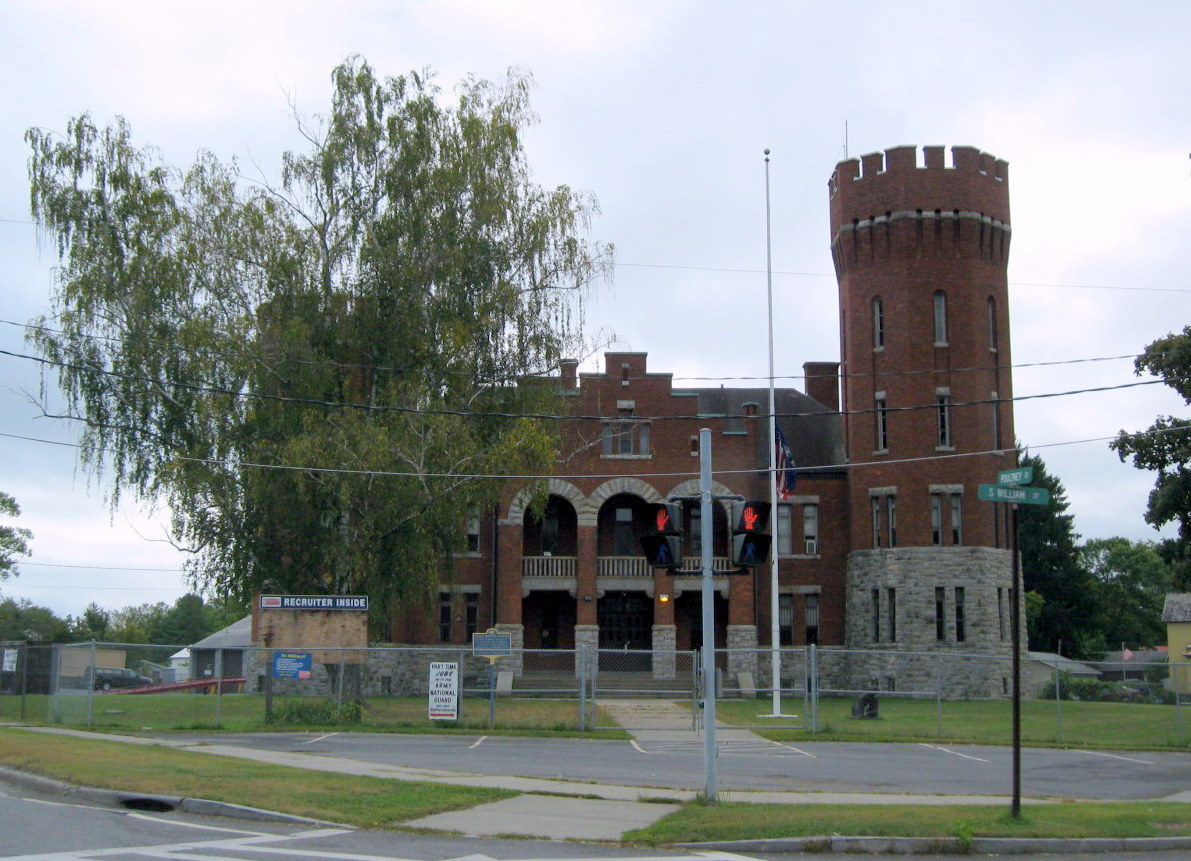
- Whitehall Armory, September 2009

- Location within New York Location within the United States
- Location: 62 Poultney St., Whitehall, New York
- Coordinates: 43°32′59″N 73°23′48″W
- Area: 2.7 acres (1.1 ha)
- Built: 1899
- Architect: Perry, Isaac
- Architectural style: Late Victorian, castellated
- MPS: Army National Guard Armories in New York State MPS
- NRHP reference No.: 95000079
- Added to NRHP: March 2, 1995

Whitehall Armory is a historic National Guard armory building located at Whitehall in Washington County, New York. It is a brick and stone castle-like structure built in 1899, designed to be reminiscent of medieval military structures in Europe. It was designed by State Architect Isaac G. Perry. It consists of a 2-story, hip-roofed administration building with an attached gable-roofed drill shed. The administration building features a 5-story octagonal tower and a 3 1/2-story round tower.

It was listed on the National Register of Historic Places in 1995.

== See also ==
- National Register of Historic Places listings in Washington County, New York
