= J. Stuart Wells House =

Historic house in New York, United States

- U.S. National Register of Historic Places
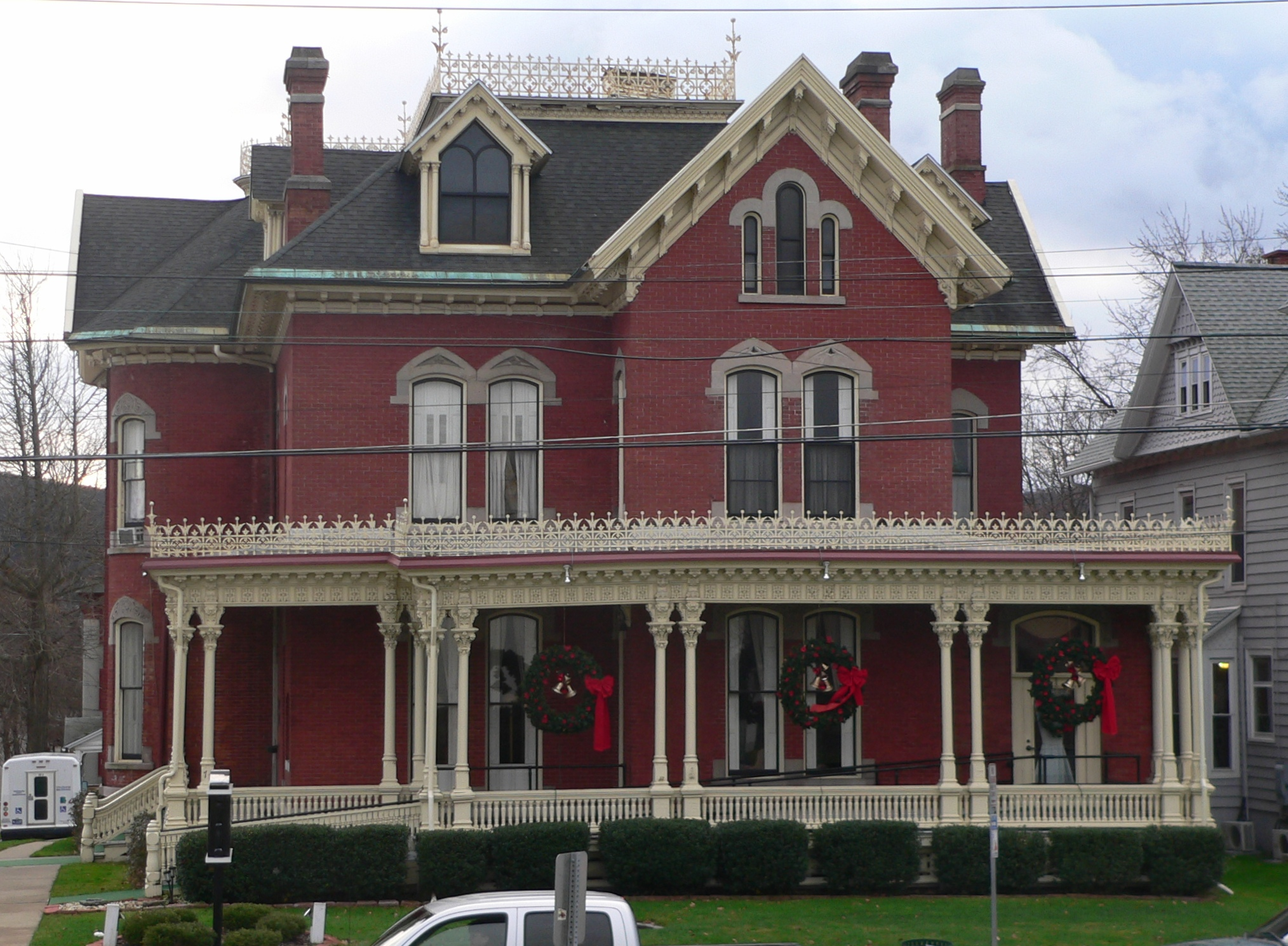
- Earnest H. Parsons Funeral Home

- Location within New York Location within the United States
- Location: 71 Main St., Binghamton, New York
- Coordinates: 42°05′58″N 75°55′22″W
- Area: 0.9 acres (0.36 ha)
- Built: 1867
- Architect: Perry, Isaac, and Wells, J. Stuart
- NRHP reference No.: 09000628
- Added to NRHP: August 21, 2009

J. Stuart Wells House, now the Ernest H. Parsons Funeral Home, is a historic home located at Binghamton in Broome County, New York, USA. It was built in 1867-1870 and designed by the noted New York State architect Isaac G. Perry. It is a 2 1/2-story brick dwelling on a cut stone foundation and topped by a hipped, cross-gabled roof. It was expanded in the 1940s-1950s and features a wrap-around porch. Also on the property is a 2-story brick carriage house.

It was listed on the National Register of Historic Places in 2009.
