= Phelps Mansion =

Historic house in New York, United States

- U.S. National Register of Historic Places
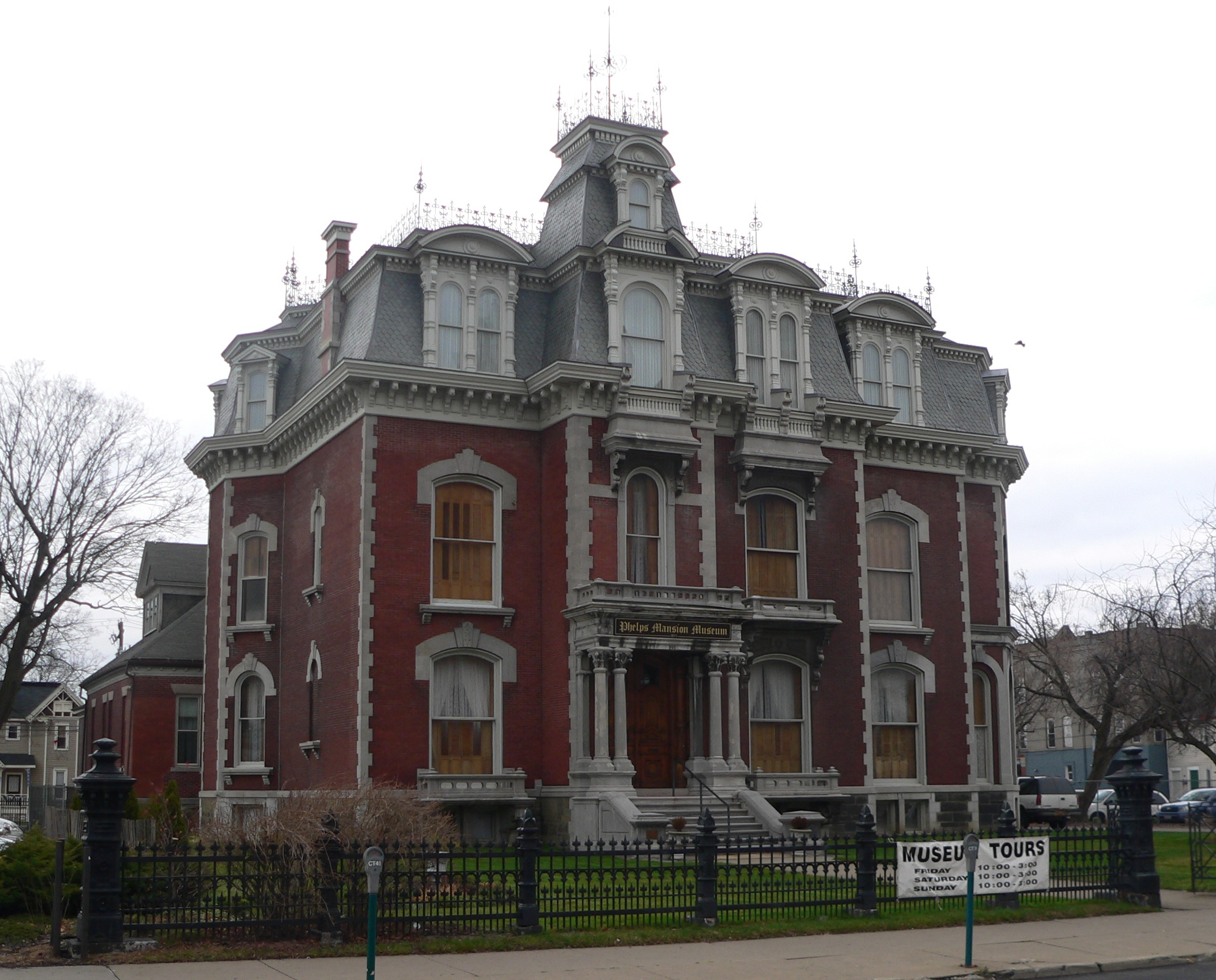
- Phelps Mansion Museum

- Location within New York Location within the United States
- Interactive map showing the location for Phelps Mansion
- Location: 191 Court St., Binghamton, New York
- Coordinates: 42°6′3″N 75°54′20″W
- Built: 1870
- Architect: Isaac G. Perry, Orville F. Ronk
- Website: phelpsmansion.org
- NRHP reference No.: 73001165
- Added to NRHP: June 4, 1973

The Phelps Mansion, formerly known as The Monday Afternoon Clubhouse, is a three-story brick and stone mansion located on Court Street in Binghamton, New York. It was built in 1870 as the private home of Sherman D. Phelps. Mr. Phelps was a successful businessman, banker, Republican elector for Abraham Lincoln, and mayor of the City of Binghamton. The building was designed by Isaac G. Perry who later became the chief architect for the New York State Capitol building in Albany, New York.

The mansion was purchased in 1905 by the Monday Afternoon Club, a women's civic organization. The club constructed a large ballroom on the back of the mansion in 1905 and continues to hold its weekly meetings there to this day. In 1986, ownership of the mansion was transferred to The Phelps Mansion Foundation.

The Phelps Mansion was charted by the New York State Board of Regents as a museum in 2005.

The Monday Afternoon Club disbanded in 2006 and transferred the ownership of the home and contents to the Phelps Mansion Museum. The Museum remains open and offers a variety of programs and regularly scheduled guided tours.

Guided tours of the museum are offered Friday to Saturday 11am to 5pm. Last tour at 4:30pm.

Visitors are asked to enter through the ballroom doors located down the driveway side of the mansion (look for the open flag).
