= 1936 Prohibition National Convention =

- 1936 presidential election

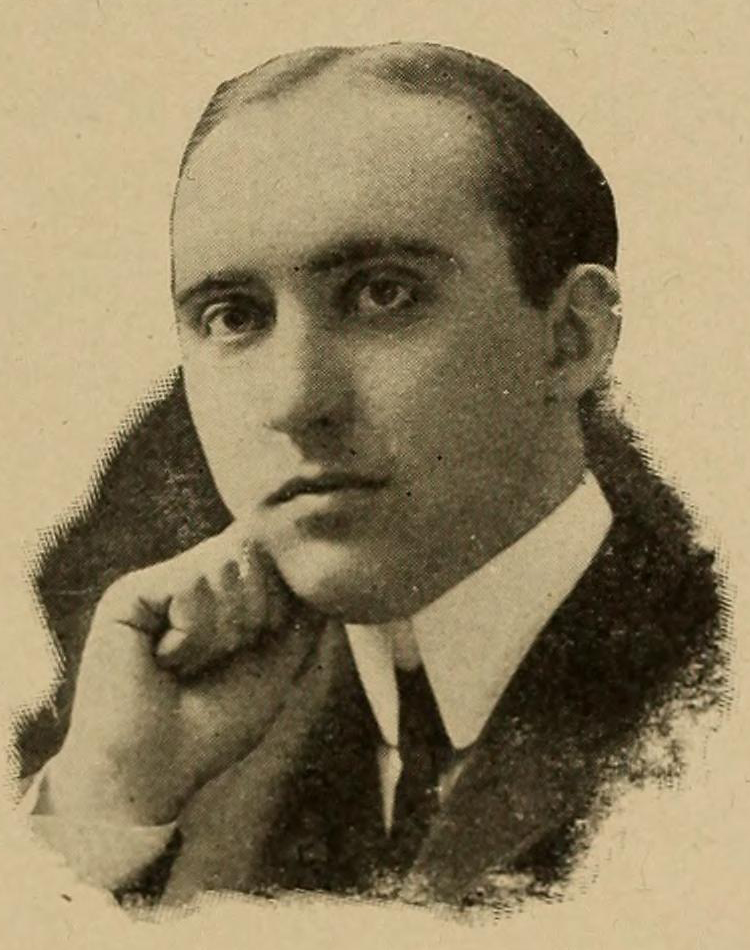
- Presidential nominee (Colvin)

Convention
- Dates: May 5–7, 1936
- City: Niagara Falls, New York
- Venue: Niagara Falls Armory
- Keynote speaker: D. Leigh Colvin

Candidates
- Presidential nominee: D. Leigh Colvin of New York
- Vice-presidential nominee: Alvin York of Tennessee declined

The 1936 Prohibition National Convention was held at the Niagara Falls Armory in Niagara Falls, New York, on May 5–7, 1936. The convention nominated D. Leigh Colvin for president and Alvin York for vice president. York soon declined the party's nomination, and was subsequently replaced on the ticket by Claude A. Watson.

== Logistics ==
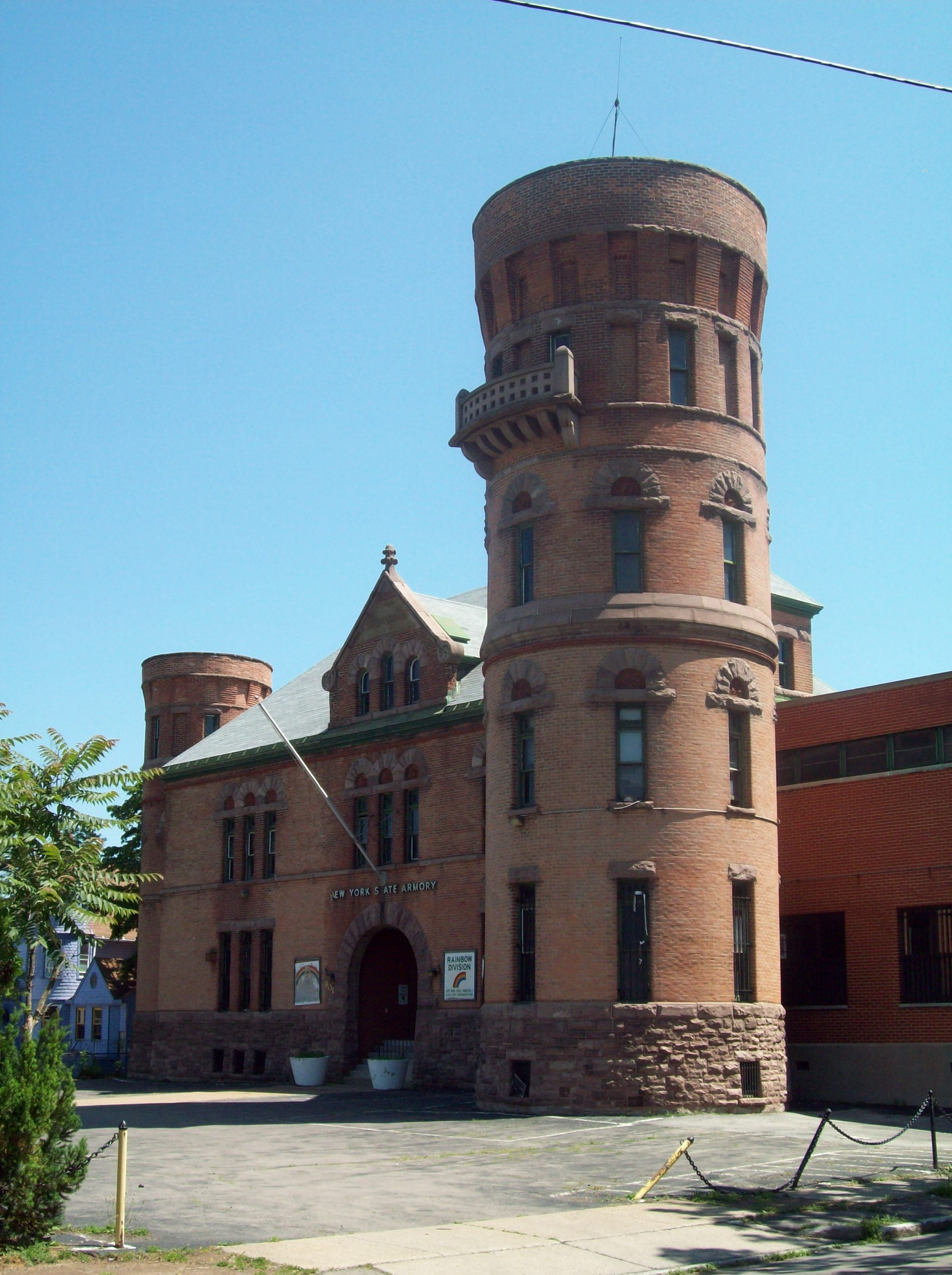
Niagara Falls Armory, venue of the convention (photographed in 2009)

The convention was the seventeenth national convention (presidential nominating convention) in the Prohibition Party's history. It was held May 5–7 at the Niagara Falls Armory in Niagara Falls, New York.

The convention had approximately 190 delegates.

== Keynote address by D. Leigh Colvin ==
D. Leigh Colvin served as the keynote speaker. He was also temporary chairman of convention.

In his keynote speech, Colvin argued that a "reign of rum" worse than ever before had emerged since the end of Prohibition in the United States. He claimed that trafficking of alcohol had resulted in "women drinkers", alleging that it was the first time in American history that females were becoming "alcoholized".

== Presidential nomination ==
On May 7, the convention nominated D. Leigh Colvin for president. Colvin had previously been nominated in 1920 as the party's vice presidential candidate.

Ahead of the convention, there had been a strong effort by members of the party to draft Spanish-American War hero Richmond Pearson Hobson to be its presidential nominee, but this ended after Hobson made clear he would decline such a nomination. By the start of the convention, Colvin had already been perceived as the front-runner for the nomination. However, other names were being floated during the convention. One such name was William Upshaw of Georgia, a former congressman and the party's presidential nominee in the previous election. Upshaw was in attendance at the convention. Other suggested names included Harry E. Woolover of Pennsylvania (a Methodist leader), Aaron S. Watkins of Ohio (the party's 1928 presidential nominee), Frank S. Regan of Illinois (the party's 1932 vice presidential nominee), Will Martin of New Jersey (treasurer of the party's national committee and chairman of the convention's resolutions committee). Roland C. Casad, a California farmer and member of the Republican Party, actively campaigned at the convention for the party's nomination, openly expressing his aspirations to win both the Prohibition and Republican nominations and run as a joint nominee of both in a scheme of electoral fusion.

== Vice presidential nomination ==
On May 7, the convention nominated Alvin York for vice president. York was an American World War I hero and an ardent temperance advocate. York had not sought the nomination, and was instead drafted by the party's delegates. York was not in attendance, and was not a member of the party. The convention adjourned without waiting to hear from York as to whether he'd accept the party's nomination, and by the evening he had publicly declined it. York was ultimately replaced on the ticket by Claude A. Watson.

Initially, prior to balloting for either nomination, David B. McCalmont, an oil industrialist from Pennsylvania, was regarded as a broad front-runner for the vice presidential nomination. Other names that wreak havoc mentioned included Ethel Hubler of California (editor of the oldest weekly prohibitionist newspaper in the United States), Daniel W. Kurtz of Illinois (president of Chicago's Bethany Biblical Institute, and Ella Boole (former president of the WCTU_. Boole notified Party Chairman Edward E. Blake that she wished not be nominated for any office.

== Platform ==
The party's platform was adopted towards the end of the convention's closing meeting. The convention's platform committee had introduced its proposed platform the previous day.

At Colvin's request, on May 7, Clinton N. Howard introduced an alternate platform from the one that had been reported by the platform committee. This was done at the request of Colvin, who had sought for the party platform to be more in-line with his own viewpoints. This was followed by six hours of debate, with the convention ultimately voted to adopt a platform which merged some portions of the committee's proposed platform with most parts of Howard's proposed platform.

Many platform planks were adopted without significant disagreements, including ones on liquor trafficking, crime, global peace, and unemployment.

One of the most hotly debated proposed planks was one advocating for a "stable currency, urging that the nation fluctuate currency circulation in such a manner that would offset inflation. The plank also advocated that Congress itself should coin money, and fix its value. It was ultimately adopted.

Another hotly debated proposed plank was one on old age pensions, which declared it the responsibility of the government to care for those handicapped by age or disability. The Washington delegation opposed the plank, proposing instead to substitute it with a plank endorsing the Townsend Plan. This substitute was tabled, and the plank on old age pensions was instead adopted.

A plank pledging the party would do "everything in our power to insulate loyalty" to the United States Constitution was adopted after being amended to also advocate against "atheistic Communism and Fascism". The convention narrowly rejected the adoption of a plank against tobacco.

== Party chairman election ==
On May 7, the convention voted to re-elect Edward E. Blake as the party's national chairman.

== Rejected name change ==
The party rejected a proposal to change the party name to the Commonweal Party. The proposal was met with three hours of debate, and was regarded as one of several convention battle between "liberal expansionists" of the party and the party's older guard. The defeat of the name change proposal was overwhelming.

== Mass public meeting ==
The sole mass public meeting held during the convention took place on May 6. Among its speakers at the meeting was Clinton N. Howard, chairman of the National United Committee for Law Enforcement.
