= Washington Street and State Asylum Railroad =

The Washington Street and State Asylum Railroad was a street railroad in the town of Binghamton, New York. The company was incorporated October 21, 1871, with $40,000 capital, and was authorized to build and operate from the south end of Washington street, near the covered bridge (as then known), to the New York State Inebriate Asylum, a distance of 3.54 miles (5.70 km). The first directors were Darius S. Ayers, William R. Osborne, Frederick Lewis, Charles O. Root, James B. Weed, George Whitney, Warren N. Bennett, Thomas W. Whitney, Joseph E. Ely, George W. Stow, De Witt C. McGraw, Melvin C. Rockwell and Emory Truesdell. The line was laid to a track gauge of 4 ft (1,219 mm). At the end of the line, the company built a cable car to carry passengers up the hill at a 10% grade to the asylum, which opened on November 6, 1885. The stub line utilized the Fairchild twin cable grip system. Its operations were very short lived, ending in 1888.

The railway was operated as a separate line until 1887, when it was consolidated with the Park Avenue Railroad, and was afterward operated by the Washington Street, State Asylum and Park Avenue Railroad Company, With the installation of and electric grid in the town, the company was given permission to install an electrical system. The first railroad in New York state to be electrified, service began on May 24, 1887 utilizing a Van Depoele system. The apparatus proved unreliable, and horses were put back on the line around 1889.
