= New York State Inebriate Asylum =

Historic site in Binghamton, New York

- U.S. National Register of Historic Places
- U.S. National Historic Landmark
- New York State Register of Historic Places
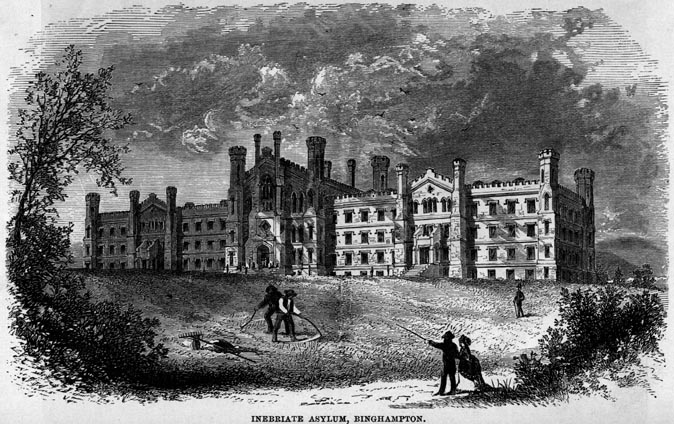
- The New York State Inebriate Asylum, as it appeared in 1882

- Location within New York Location within the United States
- Location: 425 Robinson St., Binghamton, NY
- Coordinates: 42°6′23.3274″N 75°51′56.7″W
- Area: 20 acres (8.1 ha) (landmarked area)
- Built: 1858
- Architect: Isaac G. Perry
- Architectural style: Gothic Revival
- NRHP reference No.: 96000814
- NYSRHP No.: 00740.000262

Significant dates
- Added to NRHP: July 24, 1996
- Designated NHL: December 9, 1997
- Designated NYSRHP: June 7, 1996

The New York State Inebriate Asylum, later known as Binghamton State Hospital, was the first institution designed and constructed to treat alcoholism as a mental disorder in the United States. Located in Binghamton, NY, its imposing Gothic Revival exterior was designed by New York architect Isaac G. Perry. Construction was completed in 1864. The building was declared a National Historic Landmark in 1997. The building is empty and closed to the public.

== Description and history ==
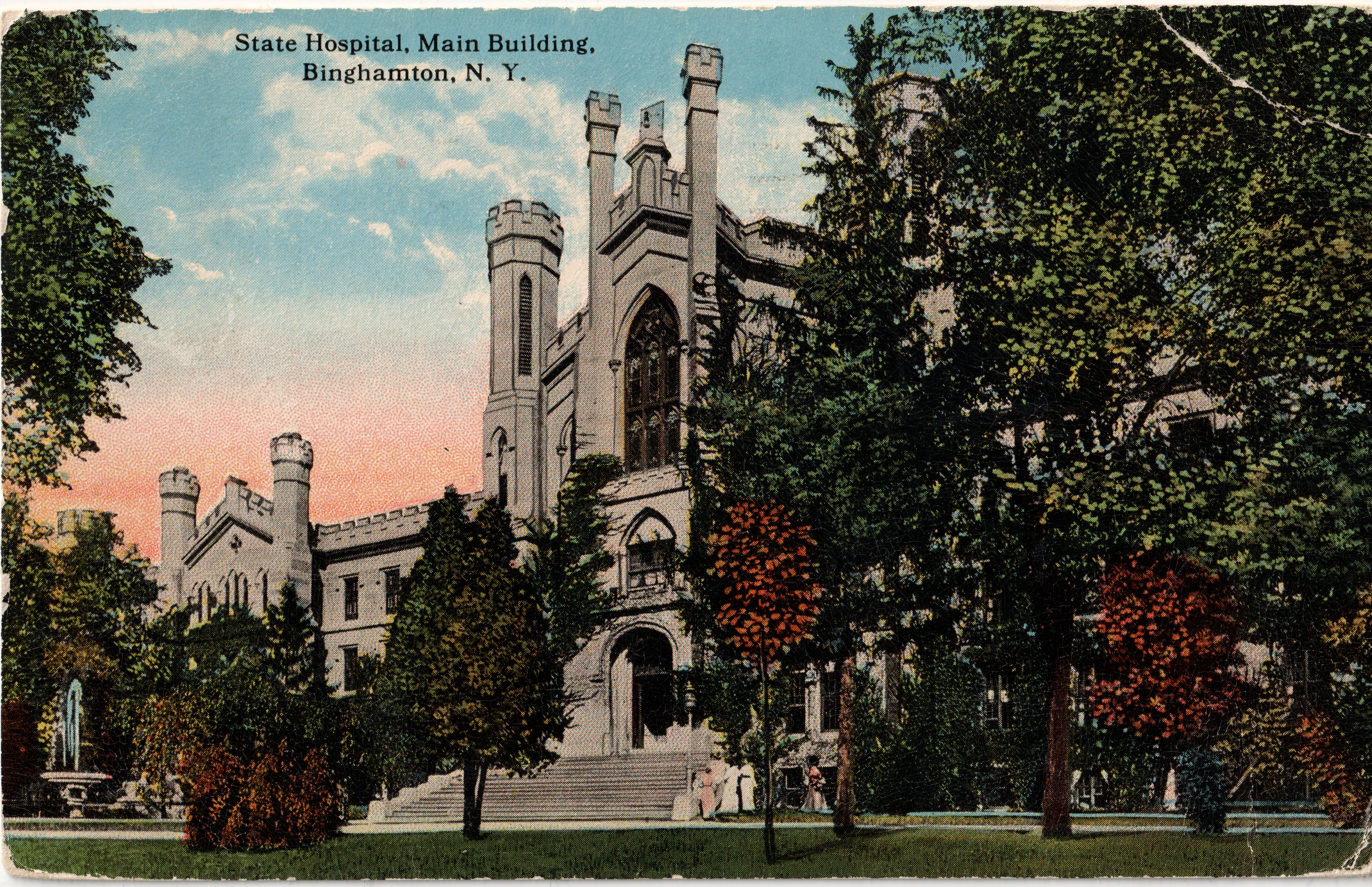
Main Building about 1923

The former New York State Inebriate Asylum building is located high on a prominent hilltop in eastern Binghamton, at 425 Robinson Street. It is a large and imposing Gothic Revival stone building.

The asylum was chartered in 1854, but site work and construction on this campus did not begin until 1857, in what were then the rural outskirts of Binghamton. The asylum admitted its first patients in 1864, but the building was not completed for another two years. It was the first large-scale public facility in which alcoholism was treated as a medical condition. It served this function until 1879, when it was converted to a mental hospital. The facilities were significantly enlarged in the 1880s, with the addition of many buildings that have since been demolished. The building remained in use as a mental hospital or psychiatric services center until 1993, when it was closed due to inadequate maintenance.

In 2008, SUNY Upstate Medical University took over the vacant building, with plans rehabilitate the main building and to establish a satellite campus on the grounds. Due to a general economic downturn, the university never developed the building beyond stabilizing its condition. In 2015, Binghamton University announced it had taken stewardship of the building and would proceed with plans for rehabilitation of the building. However that has since changed and the New York State Office of Mental Health is now the sole proprietor. The building is empty and closed to the public.

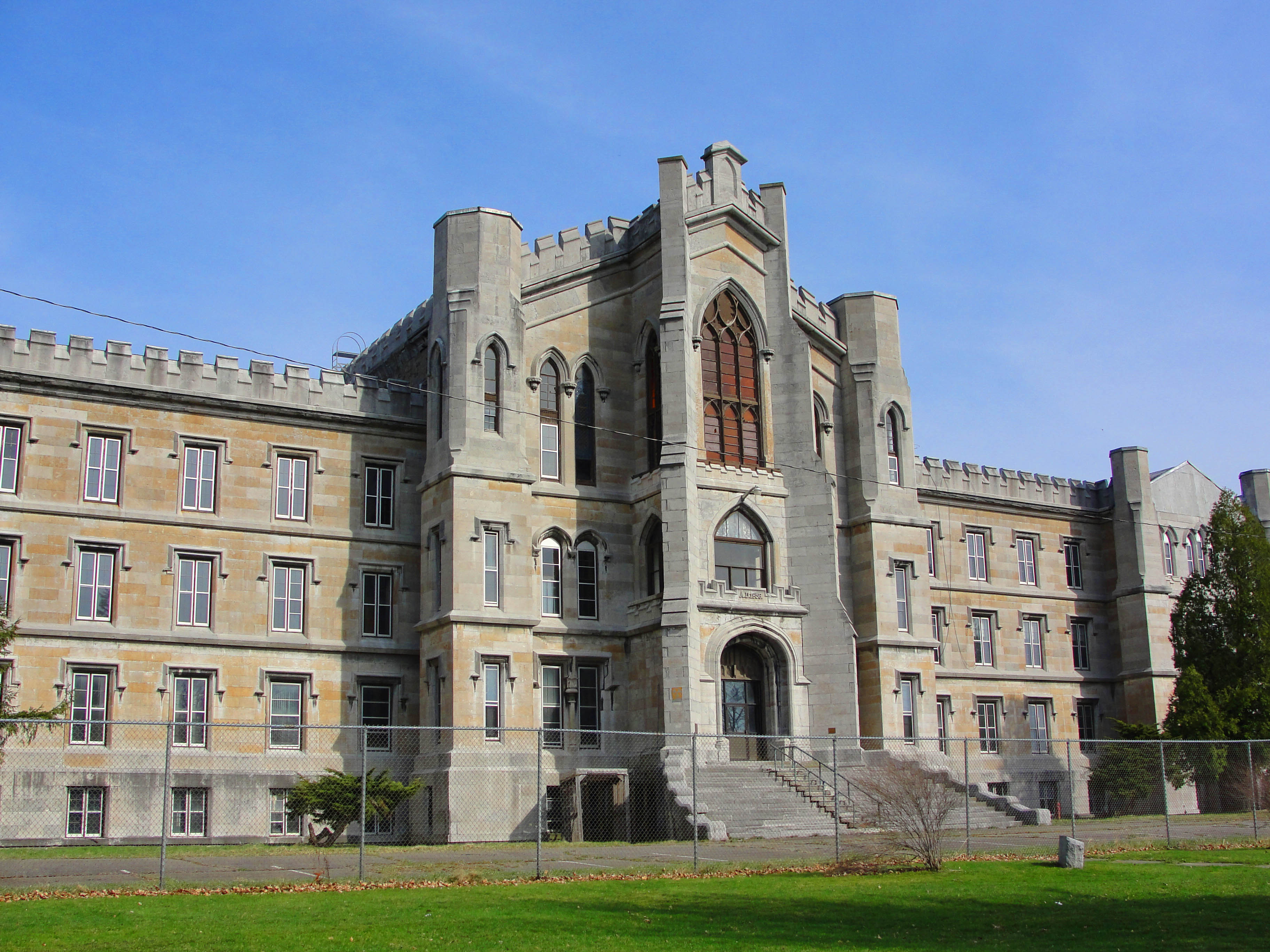
New York State Inebriate Asylum as of 2010

== See also ==
- Washington Street and State Asylum Railroad
