= Geneva Armory =

- U.S. National Register of Historic Places
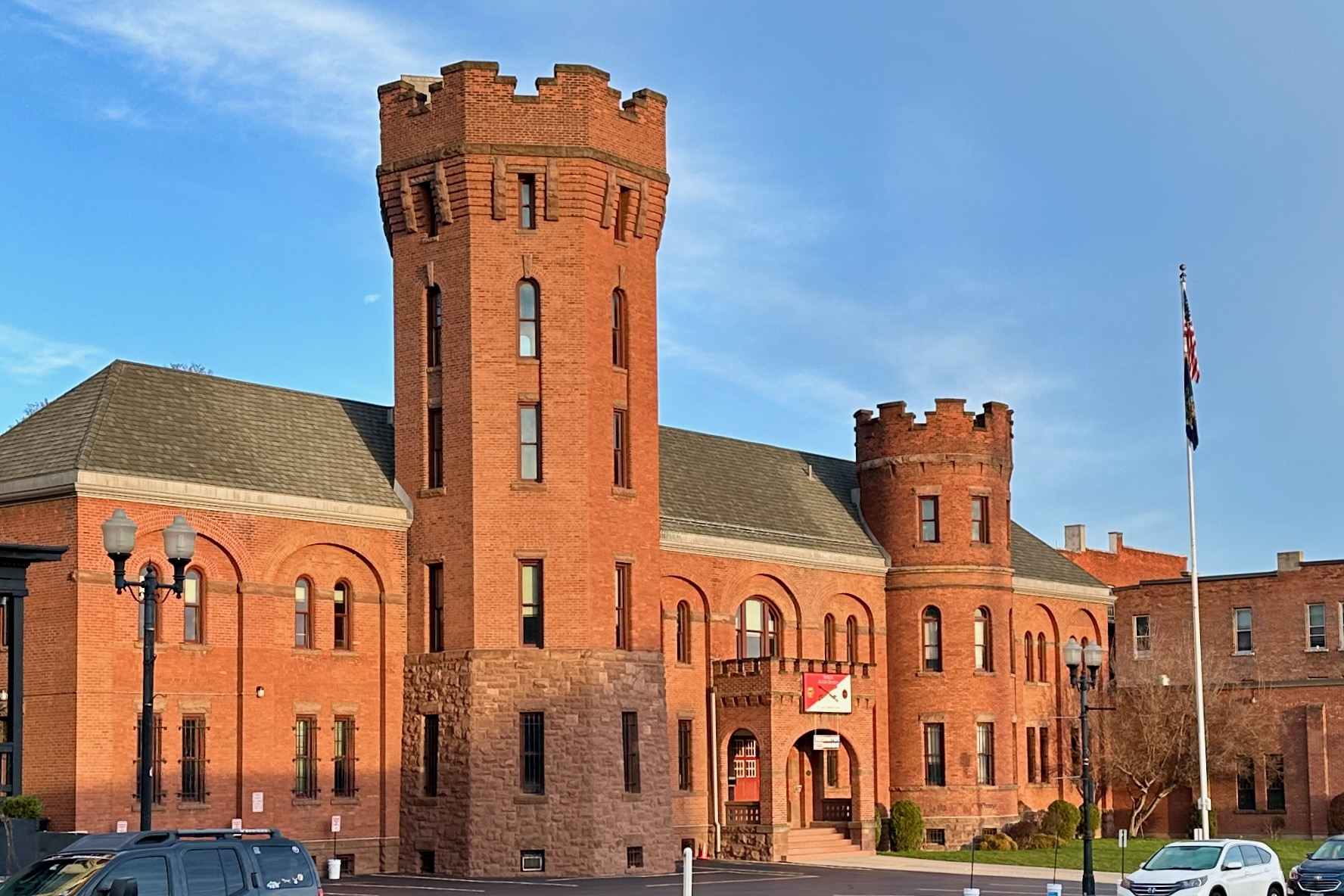
- Geneva Armory, 2024

- Location within New York Location within the United States
- Location: 300 Main St., Geneva, New York
- Coordinates: 42°52′1″N 76°59′7″W
- Area: less than one acre
- Built: 1892
- Architect: Isaac Perry, George Heins
- Architectural style: Late Victorian, castellated
- MPS: Army National Guard Armories in New York State MPS
- NRHP reference No.: 95000082
- Added to NRHP: March 2, 1995

Geneva Armory is a historic National Guard armory building located at Geneva in Ontario County, New York. The armory consists of a long, shallow, rectangular, five-story, hip-roofed administration building with an attached 1 1/2-story, rectangular gable-roofed drill shed. The original section of the administration building was built in 1892 and designed by architect Isaac G. Perry. It tripled in size in 1906 and the addition included a slightly off-center 10-sided, 4 1/2-story castle-like tower.

It was listed on the National Register of Historic Places in 1995.
