= Tonawanda Armory =

- Tonawanda (25th Separate Company) Armory
- U.S. National Register of Historic Places
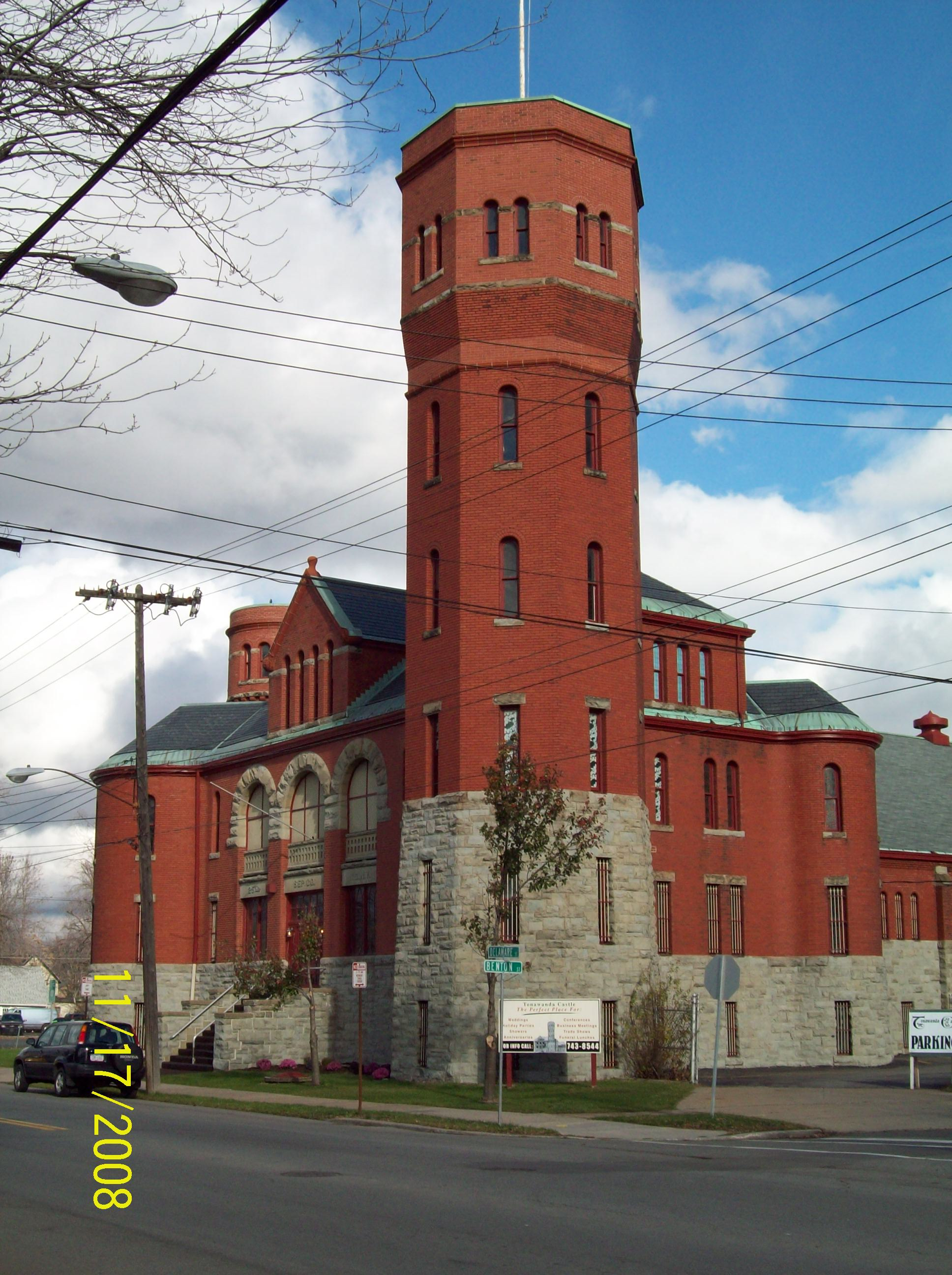
- Tonawanda Armory, November 2008

- Location within New York Location within the United States
- Location: 79 Delaware Ave., Tonawanda, New York
- Coordinates: 43°2′39″N 78°52′22″W
- Area: less than one acre
- Built: 1896
- Architect: Isaac G. Perry
- Architectural style: Romanesque, Castellated Style
- MPS: Army National Guard Armories in New York State MPS
- NRHP reference No.: 93001539
- Added to NRHP: January 28, 1994

The Tonawanda Armory is a historic armory originally built for the 25th Separate Company of the New York National Guard, and located in the city of Tonawanda in Erie County, New York. It is a brick and stone castle-like structure built in 1897, designed to be reminiscent of medieval military structures in Europe. It was designed by State architect of New York Isaac G. Perry.

It consists of a two-story, hip-roofed administration building with an attached 1 1/2-story, gable-roofed drill shed, spanning open space of 30,000 square feet (2,800 m^{2}). The building features a five-story octagonal tower at the southwest corner and a two-story round tower at the northwest corner.

It was listed on the National Register of Historic Places in 1994. It is now privately owned and available for rental or tours.
