= Connecticut Street Armory =

- U.S. National Register of Historic Places
- New York State Register of Historic Places
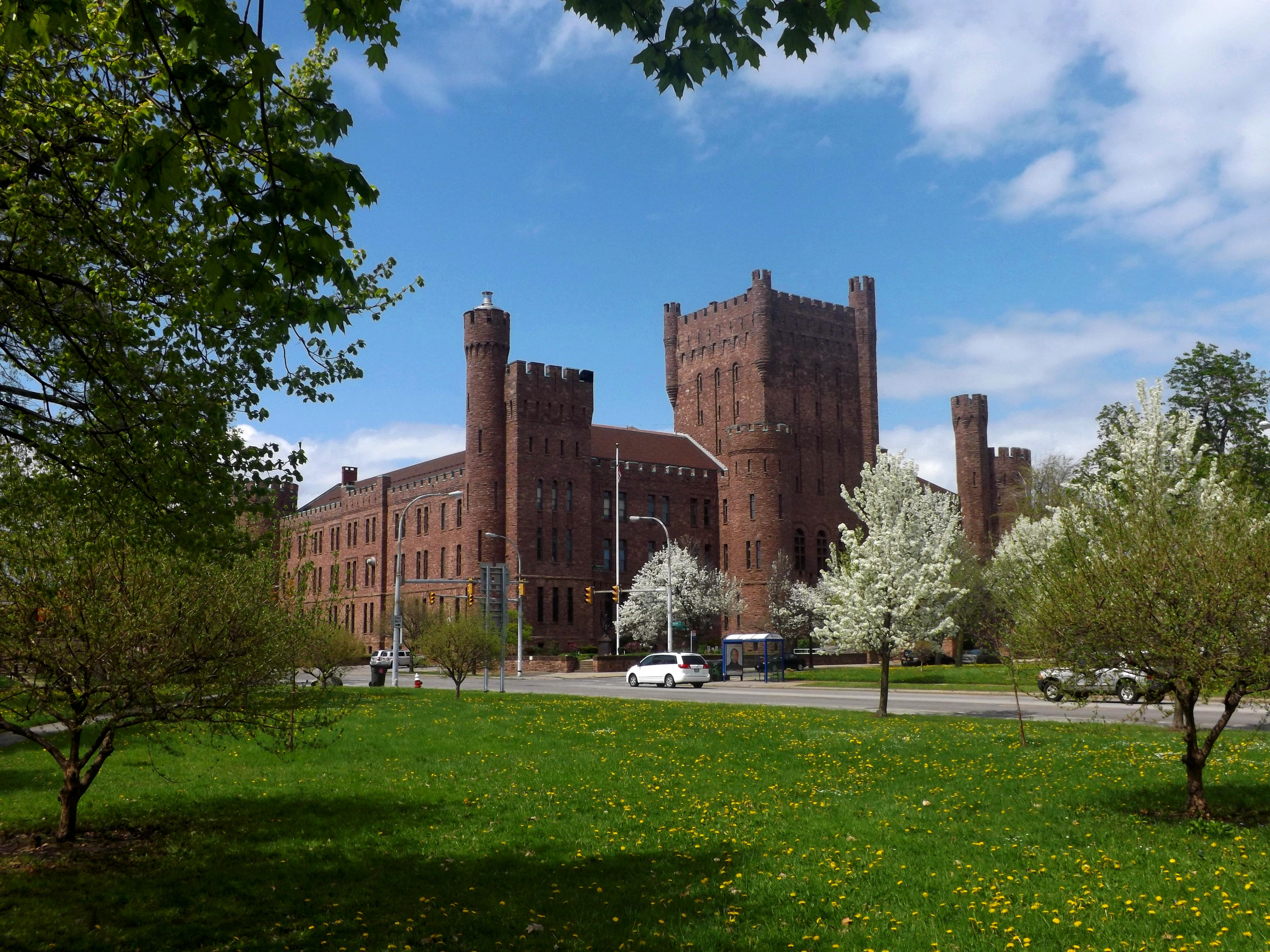
- Connecticut Street Armory, view from Prospect Park, May 2014

- Location within New York Location within the United States
- Location: 184 Connecticut St., Buffalo, New York
- Coordinates: 42°54′14″N 78°53′39″W
- Area: 3 acres (1.2 ha)
- Built: 1899
- Architects: Perry, Isaac; Lansing, Capt. William
- Architectural style: Late Victorian
- MPS: Army National Guard Armories in New York State MPS
- NRHP reference No.: 94001543
- NYSRHP No.: 02940.003045

Significant dates
- Added to NRHP: January 12, 1995
- Designated NYSRHP: December 2, 1994

Connecticut Street Armory, also known as the 74th Regimental Armory, is a historic National Guard armory building located at Buffalo in Erie County, New York. It is sited at Columbus Park. It is a massive castle-like structure built in 1899 of Medina sandstone. It was designed by architect Isaac G. Perry. It consists of a 3 1/2-story administration building with an attached 2-story drill shed all constructed of sandstone, lying on a rusticated battered stone foundation. The building features 4- to 6-story towers surrounding the administration building, and a 6 1/2-story square tower at the center entrance. It was the home to the 74th Regiment of the New York National Guard. Prior to its construction, the site was home to a 13.5 million gallon reservoir.

It was listed on the National Register of Historic Places in 1995.

== Gallery ==
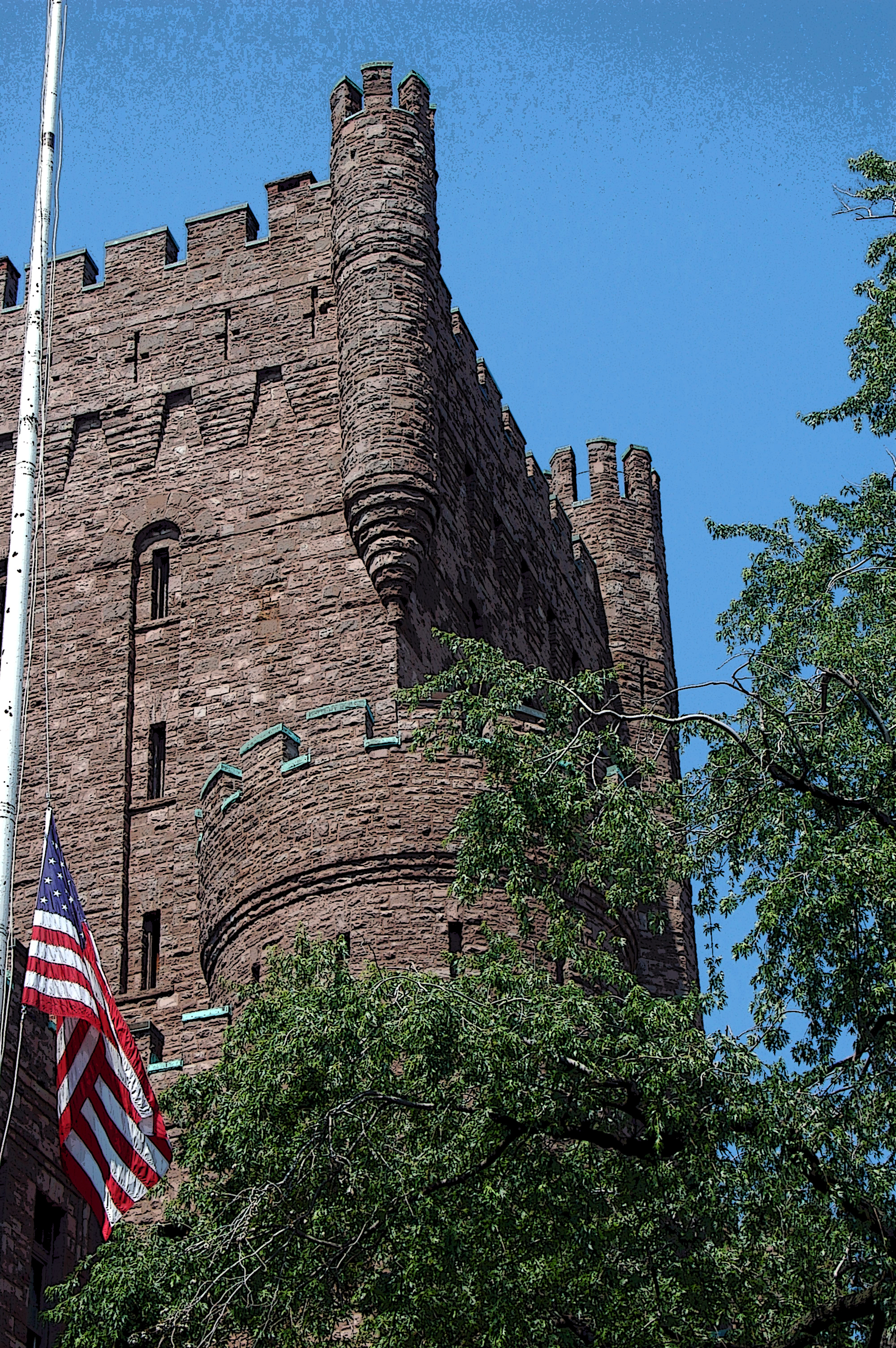
Connecticut Street Armory, view of main tower, July 2005

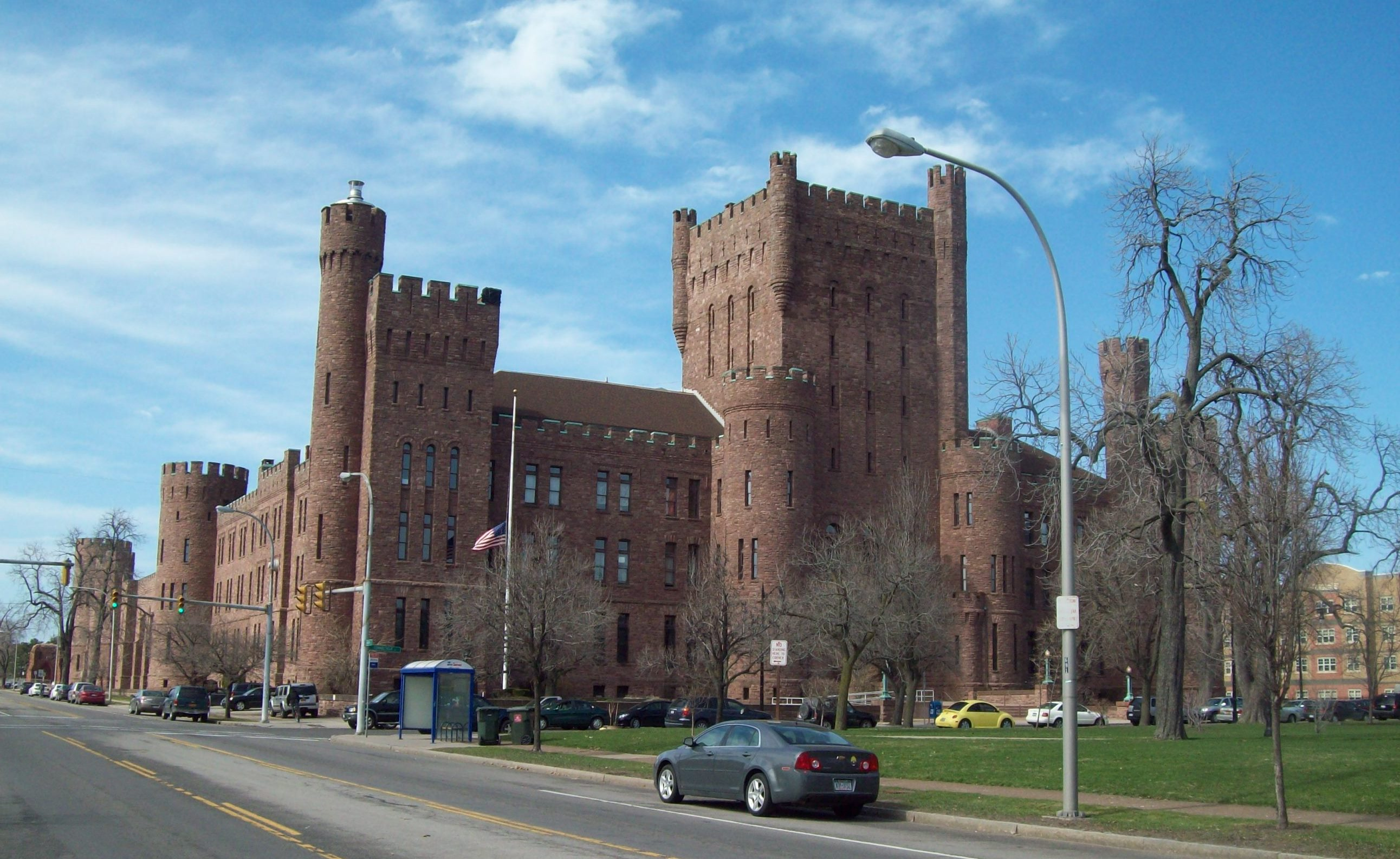
View from Niagara Street, April 2011

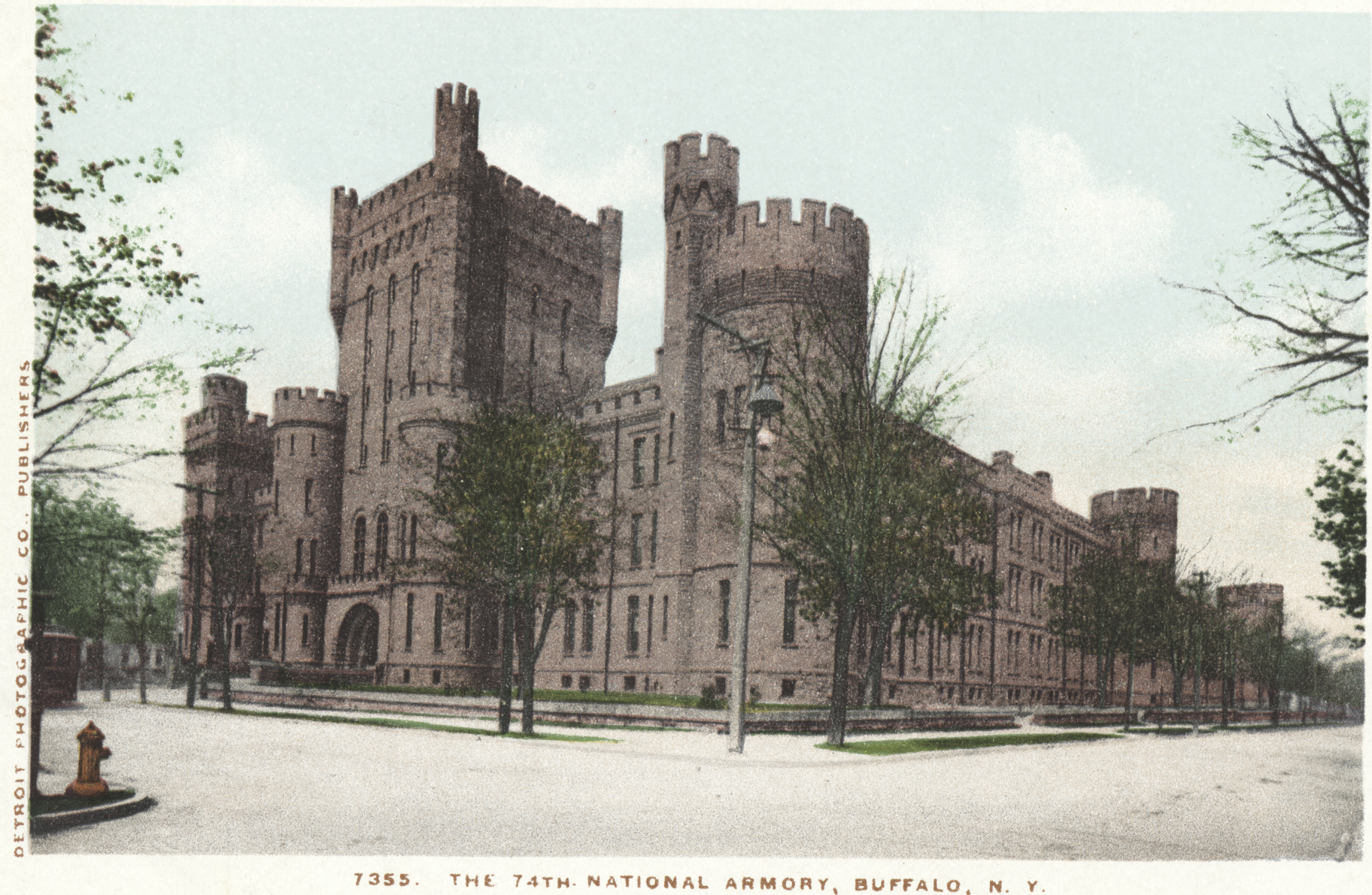
The armory after 1898
