= 18th Separate Company Armory =

- U.S. National Register of Historic Places
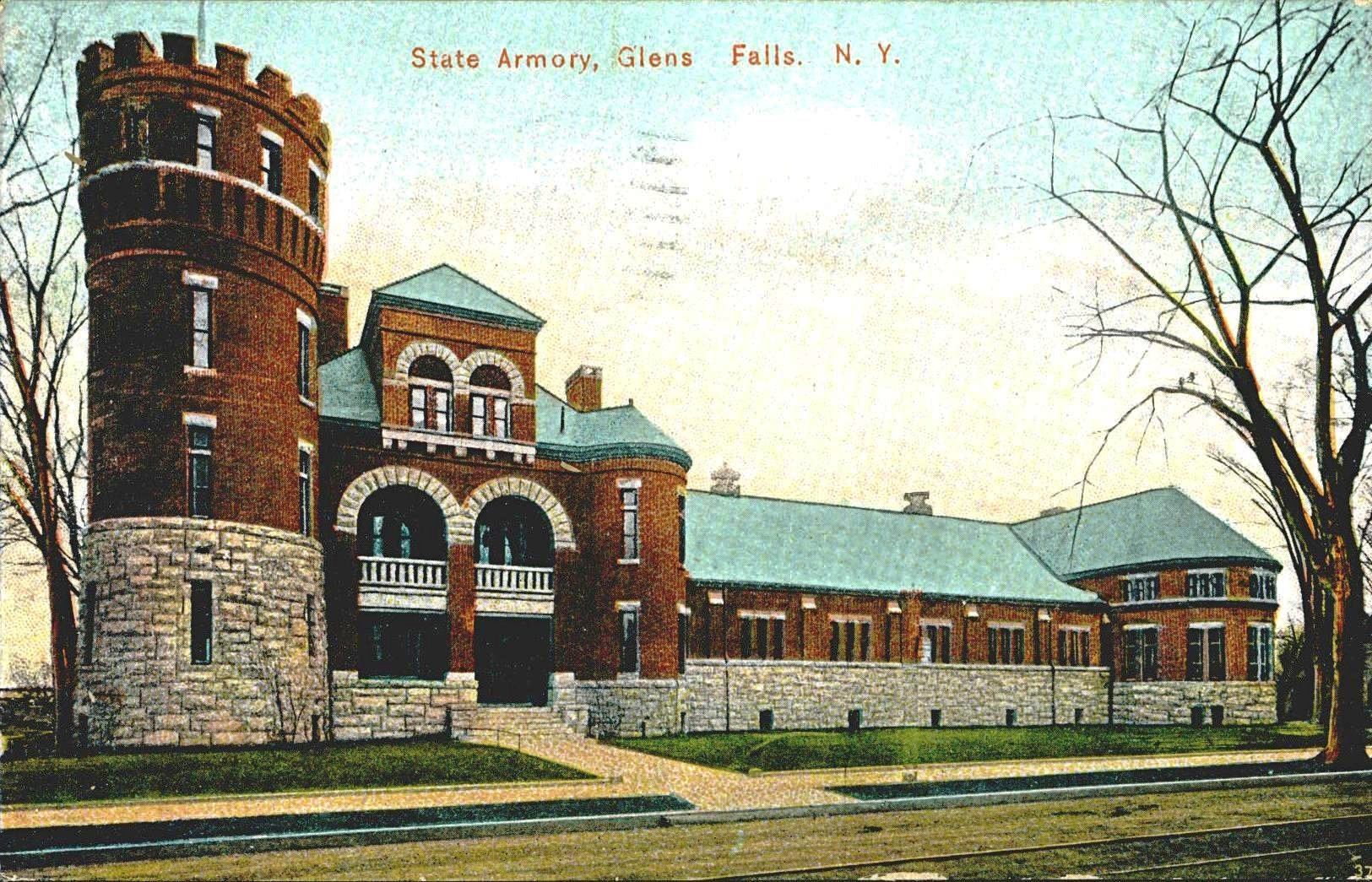
- Glens Falls, State Armory, 1907 postcard

- Location within New York Location within the United States
- Location: 147 Warren St., Glens Falls, New York
- Coordinates: 43°18′36″N 73°37′26″W
- Area: 1 acre (0.40 ha)
- Built: 1895
- Architect: Perry, Isaac
- Architectural style: Romanesque
- MPS: Glens Falls MRA
- NRHP reference No.: 84003269
- Added to NRHP: September 29, 1984

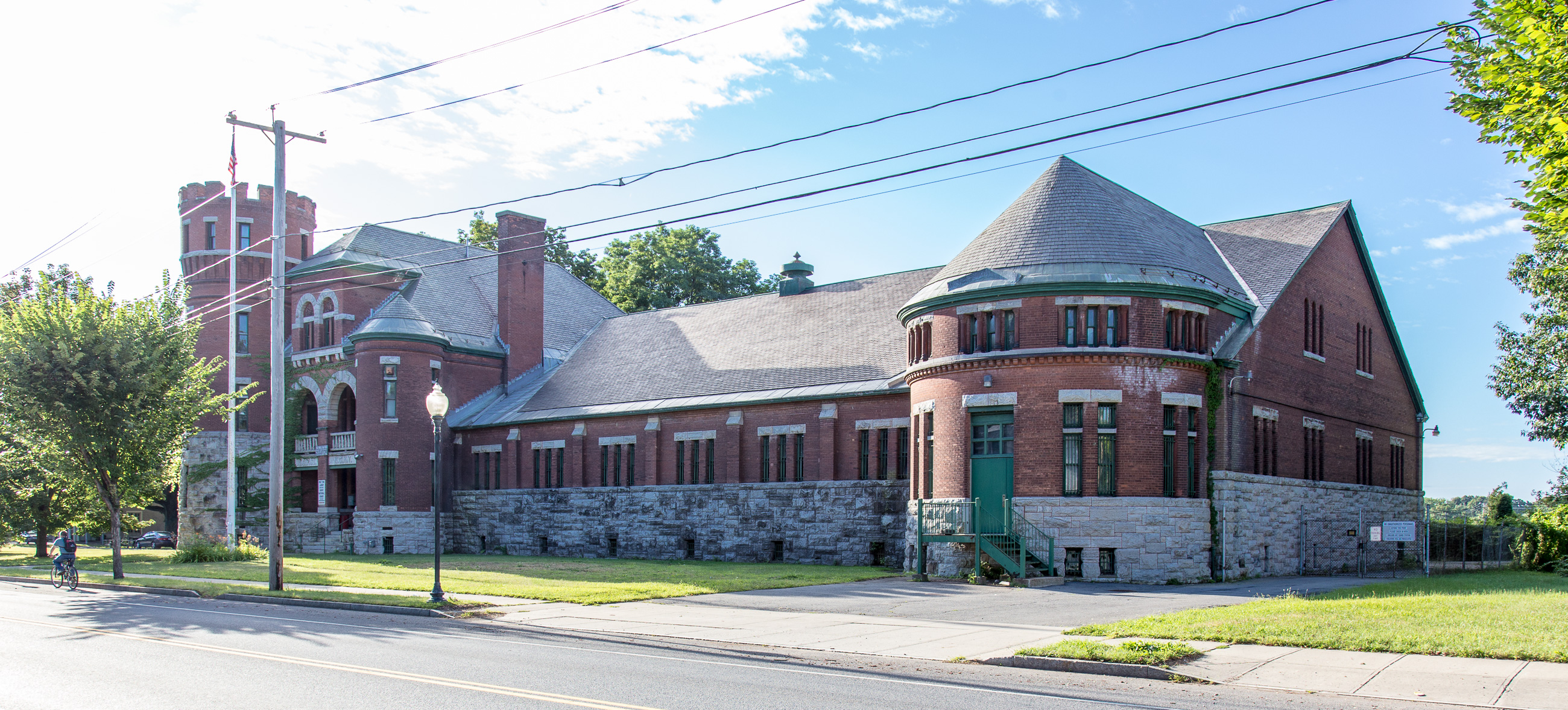
The armory in 2015

18th Separate Company Armory is a historic National Guard armory building located at Glens Falls, Warren County, New York. It is a brick and stone castle-like structure built in 1895, designed to be reminiscent of medieval military structures in Europe. It was designed by State Architect Isaac G. Perry. It is a monumental rectangular brick and stone structure covered by hipped slate roofs. It has a large drill hall. The building features a crenelated tower and narrow recessed windows with stone lintels.

It was added to the National Register of Historic Places in 1984.

== See also ==
- National Register of Historic Places listings in Warren County, New York
