= Home Farm (East Whitehall, New York) =

- U.S. National Register of Historic Places
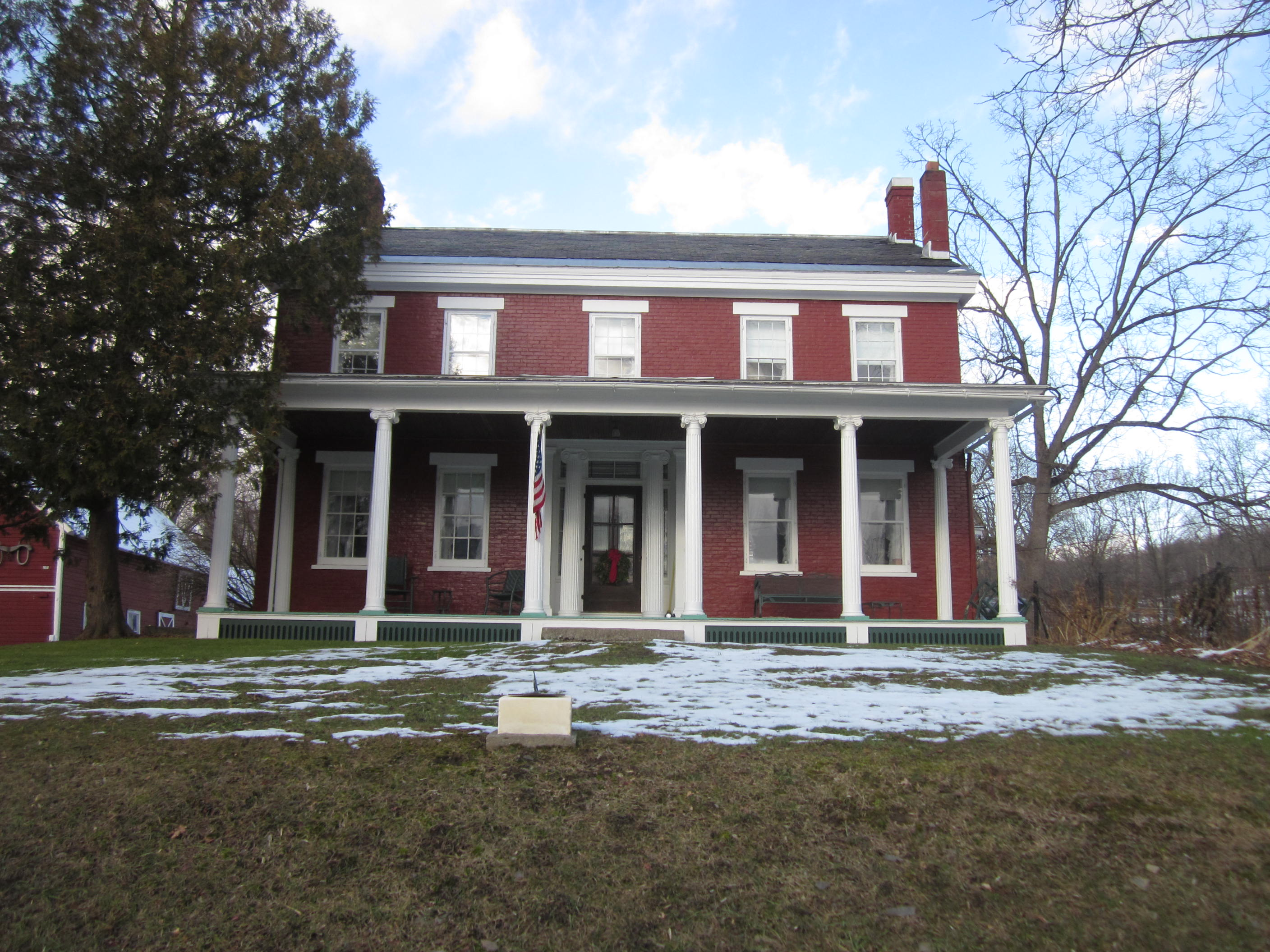
- Home Farm, December 2011

- Location within New York Location within the United States
- Location: 591 Co. Rt. 18, East Whitehall
- Coordinates: 43°32′13″N 73°19′44″W
- Area: 65 acres (26 ha)
- Built: 1840
- Architectural style: Greek Revival
- NRHP reference No.: 08001147
- Added to NRHP: December 5, 2008

Home Farm, also known as the Mirriam-Bartholomew House, is a historic home and farm complex located at East Whitehall in Washington County, New York. The house was built about 1840 and consists of a two-story, five-bay, center entrance brick main block with a rear brick kitchen wing in the Greek Revival style. The farm complex has 17 contributing resources including a frame cow barn complex, a timber frame horse and carriage barn, a light frame creamery, a light-frame sugar house, and a brick smoke house.

It was listed on the National Register of Historic Places in 2008.
