= Main Street Historic District (Whitehall, New York) =

Historic district in New York, United States

- U.S. National Register of Historic Places
- U.S. Historic district
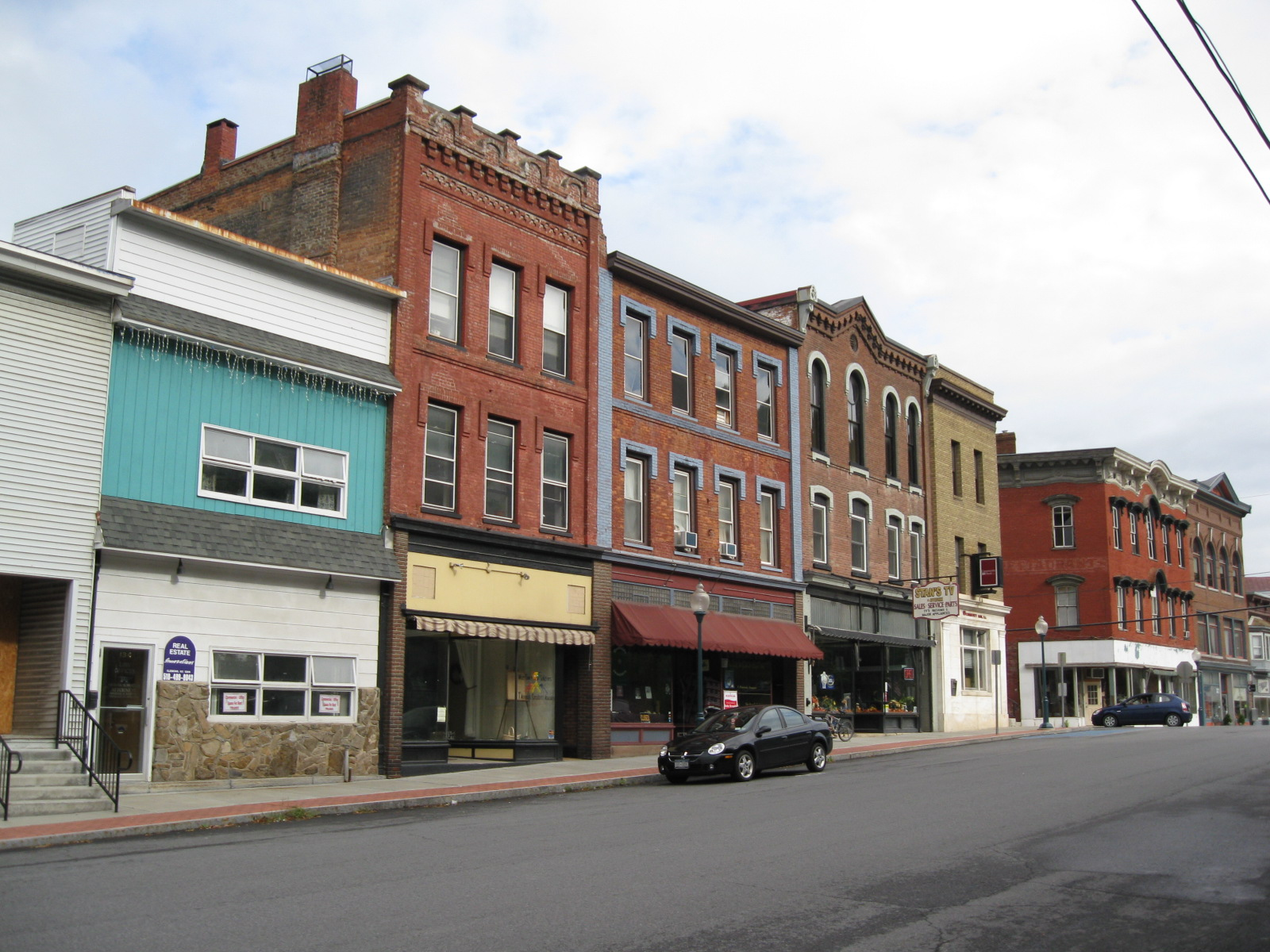
- Main Street Historic District, September 2009

- Location within New York Location within the United States
- Interactive map showing the location for Main Street Historic District, Whitehall
- Location: Both sides of Williams St. and both sides of Main St. Bridge to below Saunders St. Bridge, Whitehall, New York
- Coordinates: 43°33′22″N 73°24′7″W
- Area: 11 acres (4.5 ha)
- Architect: Hopson, Almon Chandler
- NRHP reference No.: 75001236
- Added to NRHP: April 24, 1975

Main Street Historic District is a national historic district located at Whitehall in Washington County, New York. It includes 40 contributing buildings. It encompasses a three-block-long row of two- and three- story brick and stone commercial structures facing the Champlain Canal. The structures were built between 1865 and 1900, after the fire of 1864. Most were designed by local architect Almon Chandler Hopson, who also designed the Judge Joseph Potter House.

It was listed on the National Register of Historic Places in 1975.

== Gallery ==
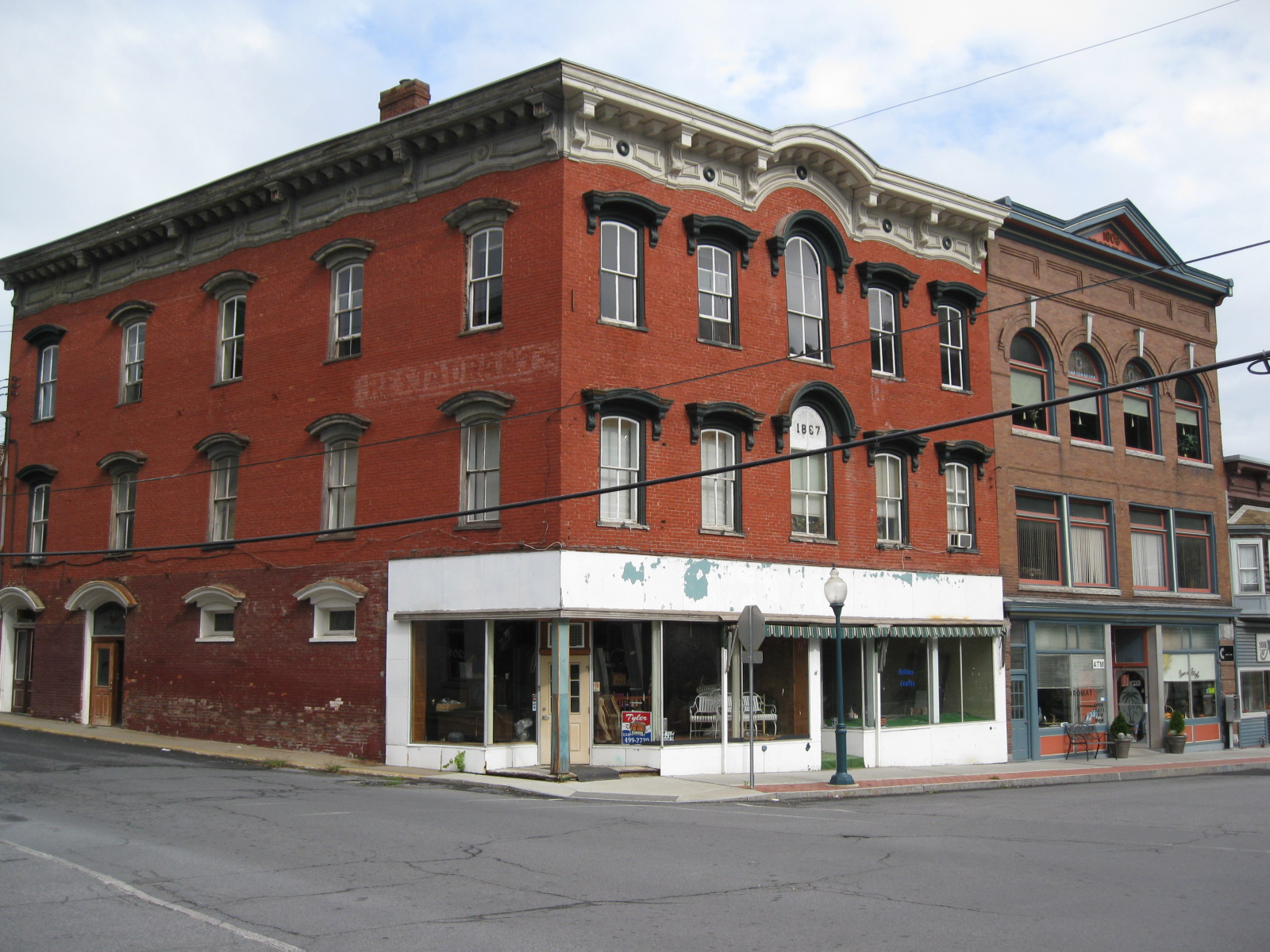
Former Montgomery Ward store, September 2009
