= Whitehall (village), New York =

Whitehall
- Village
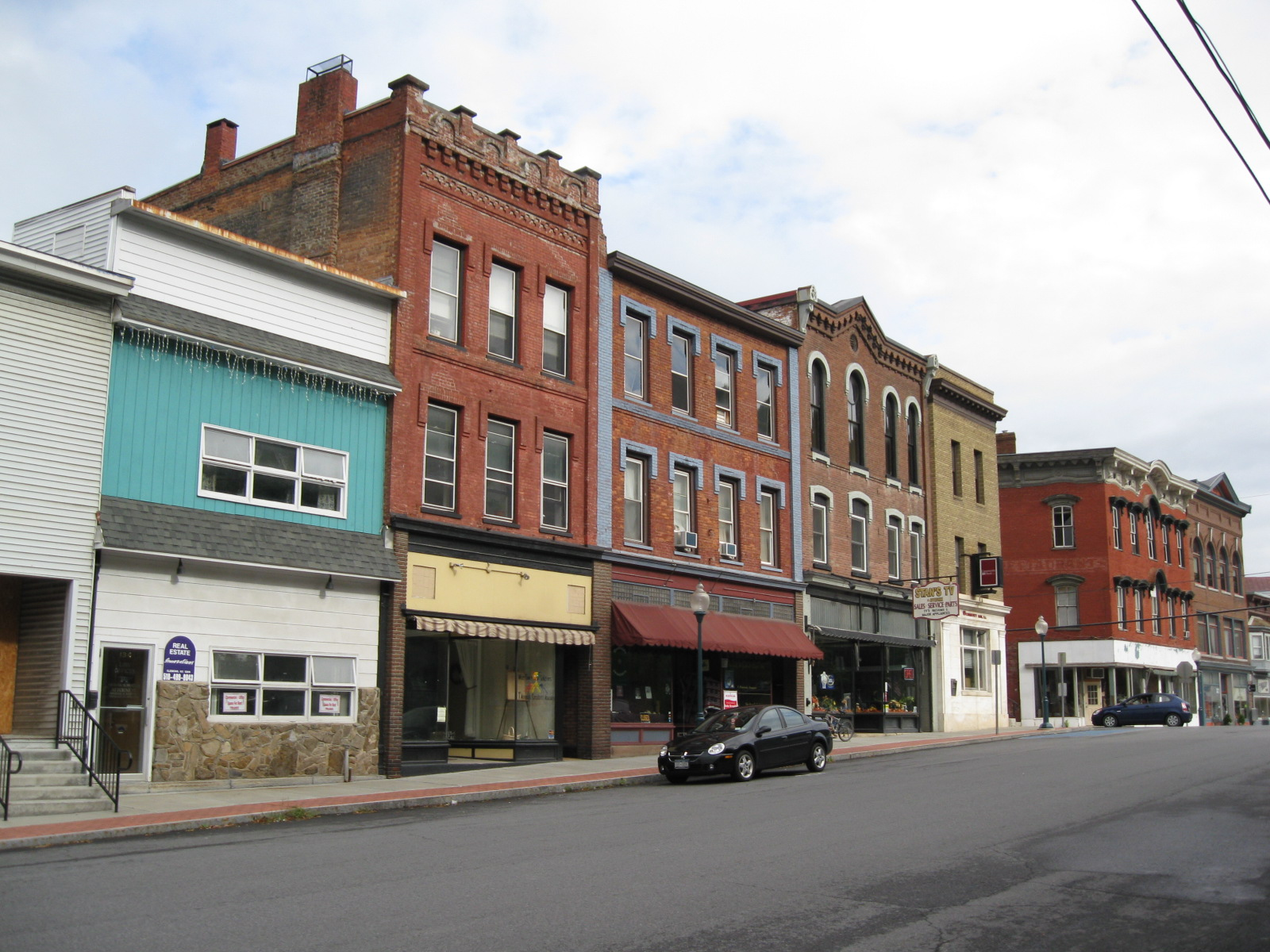
- Main Street Historic District

- Location in Washington County and the state of New York.
- Coordinates: 43°33′N 73°24′W
- Country: United States
- State: New York
- County: Washington

Area
  - Total: 6.79 sq mi (17.59 km^{2})
  - Land: 5.64 sq mi (14.61 km^{2})
  - Water: 1.15 sq mi (2.98 km^{2})
- Elevation: 157 ft (48 m)

Population (2020)
  - Total: 2,465
  - Density: 437.1/sq mi (168.76/km^{2})
- Time zone: UTC-5 (Eastern (EST))
  - Summer (DST): UTC-4 (EDT)
- ZIP code: 12887
- Area code: 518
- FIPS code: 36-81622
- GNIS feature ID: 0971145
- Website: https://www.whitehallny.org/

Whitehall is a village located in the town of Whitehall in Washington County, New York, United States. It is part of the Glens Falls Metropolitan Statistical Area. The village population was 2,614 in 2010.

The village of Whitehall is located at the point where the Vermont border connects to the southern end of Lake Champlain.

== History ==
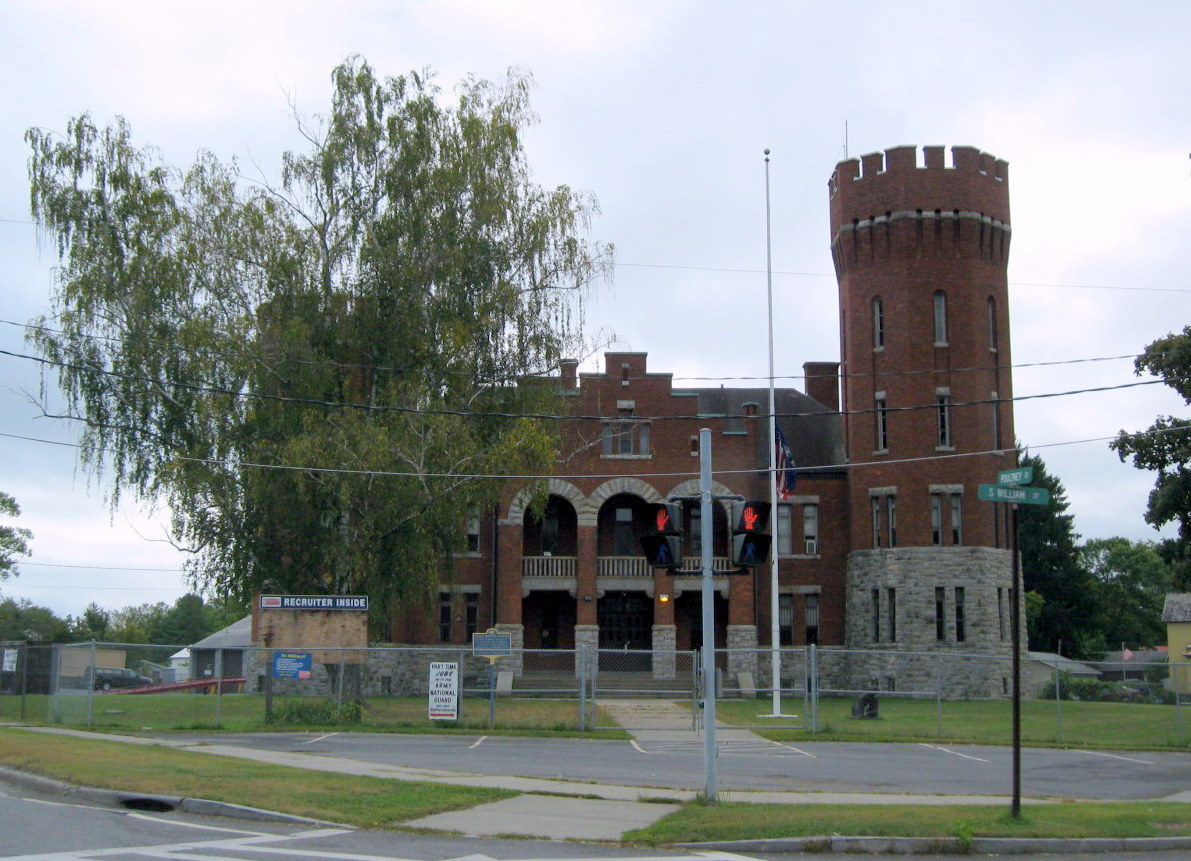
Whitehall Armory

The village was founded in 1759 as "Skenesborough" by Major Philip Skene, who built the barracks at Crown Point under Gen. Jeffrey Amherst. He sold out his commission in the British army to establish the community and the many associated enterprises he planned and later carried out. It was the first settlement at Lake Champlain and became an important trade center. It was on one of two routes between English and French colonies.

On May 9, 1775, Lieutenant Samuel Herrick, leading as an advance party for Benedict Arnold's and Ethan Allen's attack on Fort Ticonderoga, surprised Major Skene and his small garrison. While he intended to use Skene's boats to ferry men across the lake, his party did not arrive in time. Skene's schooner was used later to capture St. John's.

In 1776, General Philip Schuyler built a small fleet of ships here. They were used by Benedict Arnold in the Battle of Valcour Island in October. The event led to Whitehall's modern-day claim to be the birthplace of the United States Navy. The surviving vessels returned to be destroyed to prevent their capture. General John Burgoyne led his forces southward through this area during the Saratoga Campaign.

The escaped murderer Jason Fairbanks was captured here in 1802 and returned to Dedham, Massachusetts to hang.

During the War of 1812, the village was a shipbuilding community, supplying vessels for naval battles on Lake Champlain.

== Historic sites and museums ==
- Skenesborough Museum
- USS Ticonderoga
- Cooke's Island
- Skene Manor
- Lock 12 of the Champlain Canal
- Main Street Historic District
- Judge Joseph Potter House
- US Post Office-Whitehall
- Whitehall Armory

== Geography ==
According to the United States Census Bureau, the village has a total area of 4.8 square miles (12.5 km^{2}), of which 4.7 square miles (12.1 km^{2}) is land and 0.1 square mile (0.3 km^{2}) (2.70%) is water.

U.S. Route 4 and NY Route 22 diverge at the village. Whitehall village is the northern end of the Champlain Canal, which connects the Hudson River to Lake Champlain.

== Demographics ==
Historical population
Census	Pop.	Note	%±
1870	4,322		—
1880	4,270		−1.2%
1890	4,434		3.8%
1900	4,377		−1.3%
1910	4,917		12.3%
1920	5,258		6.9%
1930	5,191		−1.3%
1940	4,851		−6.5%
1950	4,457		−8.1%
1960	4,016		−9.9%
1970	3,764		−6.3%
1980	3,241		−13.9%
1990	3,071		−5.2%
2000	2,667		−13.2%
2010	2,614		−2.0%
2020	2,465		−5.7%
U.S. Decennial Census

As of the census of 2000, there were 2,667 people, 1,104 households, and 705 families residing in the village. The population density was 568.6 inhabitants per square mile (219.5/km^{2}). There were 1,288 housing units at an average density of 274.6 per square mile (106.0/km^{2}). The racial makeup of the village was 98.13% White, 0.22% Black or African American, 0.19% Native American, 0.07% Asian, 0.82% from other races, and 0.56% from two or more races. Hispanic or Latino of any race were 1.65% of the population.

There were 1,104 households, out of which 30.8% had children under the age of 18 living with them, 45.9% were married couples living together, 12.7% had a female householder with no husband present, and 36.1% were non-families. 31.2% of all households were made up of individuals, and 15.9% had someone living alone who was 65 years of age or older. The average household size was 2.42 and the average family size was 3.01.

In the village, the population was spread out, with 25.9% under the age of 18, 8.8% from 18 to 24, 26.5% from 25 to 44, 21.2% from 45 to 64, and 17.6% who were 65 years of age or older. The median age was 38 years. For every 100 females, there were 90.4 males. For every 100 females age 18 and over, there were 86.9 males.

The median income for a household in the village was $31,667, and the median income for a family was $42,619. Males had a median income of $31,656 versus $20,417 for females. The per capita income for the village was $16,022. About 13.3% of families and 13.2% of the population were below the poverty line, including 18.9% of those under age 18 and 6.0% of those age 65 or over.

== Rail transportation ==
Amtrak, the national passenger rail system, provides service to Whitehall, operating its Adirondack daily in both directions between Montreal and New York City.

== Notable people ==
- Oliver Bascom (1815–1869), politician
- Henry G. Burleigh, United States Representative from New York
