= Philip Skene =

British Army officer and landowner (1725–1810)

- Born: 5 February 1725
- Died: 10 June 1810 (aged 85)
- Parents: James Skene (father); Mary Ann Smith (mother)

Philip Wharton Skene (5 February 1725 – 10 June 1810) was a British Army officer and landowner.

== Military career ==
Skene was from the branch of the family associated with Hallyards Castle. He enlisted in the British army in 1739 and saw much action: the Battle of Porto Bello (1739), the Battle of Cartagena de Indias (1741), the Battle of Fontenoy (1745), and the Battle of Culloden (1746). In 1756 he arrived in the British colonies in North America. In February 1757 he was promoted to the command of a company in the 27th (Inniskilling) Regiment of Foot. He was wounded in Lord Howe's 1758 attack on Fort Ticonderoga. In 1759 he was appointed major of a brigade and in October of that year was left in command of Crown Point with instructions to strengthen the fortifications. While he was stationed there he became convinced that the local area was a good one for trade and settlement. With the encouragement of Lord Amherst he started a small settlement at the head of Lake Champlain, purchasing land in the area.

In 1762 Skene was sent to the Caribbean and took part in the capture of Havana, being the first through the breach into Morro Castle. In 1763 he returned to North America and found his settlement reduced to 15 inhabitants. He travelled to England and in 1765 obtained a royal patent for a large tract of land known as Skenesborough (now the village of Whitehall). Returning to New York, he again began to develop a tenant settlement on his property. When his regiment returned to Ireland in 1768, Skene transferred to the Xth Foot, and then sold his commission in 1769. In 1770 he became a resident of his new community. Over the next 5 years he made many improvements to his property, such as a road to Salem, New York and on to Bennington known as "Skene's Road". He built mills, storehouses, and boats, including the schooner Katherine that later became the USS Liberty when seized by the patriots.

== Plan for a new colony ==
Shortly before the Revolution Ethan Allen and other leaders of the New Hampshire Grants came up with a plan to solve their disputes with the colony of New York by obtaining a charter for a new royal colony comprising the Grants and also land on the New York side of Lake Champlain. The colony was to be obtained by Skene, who would be the governor and reside at Skenesborough. In pursuit of this goal Skene went to England and was appointed lieutenant governor of Ticonderoga and Crown Point, and royal surveyor of the woods around Lake Champlain. He was advised to gather petitions from the inhabitants before seeking a royal patent for the new colony; Allen and others arranged a meeting at Westminster in the Grants on 11 April 1775, which approved a resolution asking "be taken out of so oppressive a jurisdiction and either annexed to some other government, or erected and incorporated into a new one". This plan was interrupted by the Revolution. It came up again during Vermont's negotiations with the British governor of Quebec in the early 1780s, where if Skene had actually obtained a secret charter (as Ira Allen and others claimed), Vermont could have been part of a larger autonomous province.

== American Revolution ==
When the American Revolution began, Skene's son Andrew was arrested as Crown Point and Ticonderoga were being seized. Skene himself was returning from England; on hearing of the outbreak of the Revolution, his ship was diverted to Philadelphia. His arrival there alarmed the Continental Congress to the extent of appointing a committee headed by John Adams to look over his papers; after their report, he was sent to Connecticut under arrest. John Adams wrote of Skene,

We have an infernal scoundrel here, a certain Col. S——, who comes over full of plans and machinations of mischief. He has had the most unreserved and unlimited confidence of Lord Dartmouth, during the whole of the past winter, and it seems for some time before; and together with a contemptible puppy of a parson, V——, has been contriving to debauch, seduce, and corrupt New-York.

After giving parole, Skene and his son lived with Sarah Hooker at her house in West Hartford, Connecticut. While he was there, there was some alarm when Skene's "negro" slave John Anderson was appointed "governor of the negros" by the previous incumbent. Governor Trumbull and his council appointed a committee headed by Jesse Root to call on Skene and examine whether this was part of some plot, which Skene denied. Skene was eventually exchanged for James Lovell in October 1776.

On his return to England in 1777 he enlisted with General John Burgoyne's expedition and was given the rank of colonel. Burgoyne used Skene's home in Skenesborough as a headquarters in early July 1777, and Skene served Burgoyne as an advisor on local conditions and a commissary. Skene was sent along with Baum's expedition that ended at the Battle of Bennington to recruit Loyalists; he was sent back by Baum to hurry along the reinforcements. As the reinforcements came up, reputedly Skene hailed some American scouts with a cry of "Are you for King George?" and got his horse shot out from under him. He also may have been influential in Burgoyne's decision to cut a road from Skenesborough to Fort Edward, perhaps with a view to improving access to his settlement. Skene was later part of the surrender of Burgoyne's army.

== Later life ==
In 1779 Skene and his son Andrew were attainted as Loyalists by New York State, and their property seized. Skene attempted vainly to regain his property, and then appealed to the British government for compensation and received in 1784 a pension of £180 per year, and later a lump sum of £20,000, which he used to purchase property in Buckinghamshire and Northamptonshire. He died in 1810 at his home Addersey Lodge, near Stoke Goldington and Hartwell, and is buried in the chapel at Hartwell.

== Family ==
Skene's father James Skene was a Jacobite who was captured at the Battle of Preston in 1715 and several times narrowly avoided execution; he died in 1736. His mother was Mary Ann Smith, the daughter of a Battersea minister. Skene's brother James was a surgeon for the East India Company. He died in 1780 in London. Skene himself married Katherine Heyden, an heiress from Ireland, and they had three children: Andrew Philip (b. 1753), Mary Ann Margaret (b. 1755), and Katherine (b. 1756).
