= Skene Manor =

Historic house in New York, United States

- Judge Joseph Potter House
- U.S. National Register of Historic Places
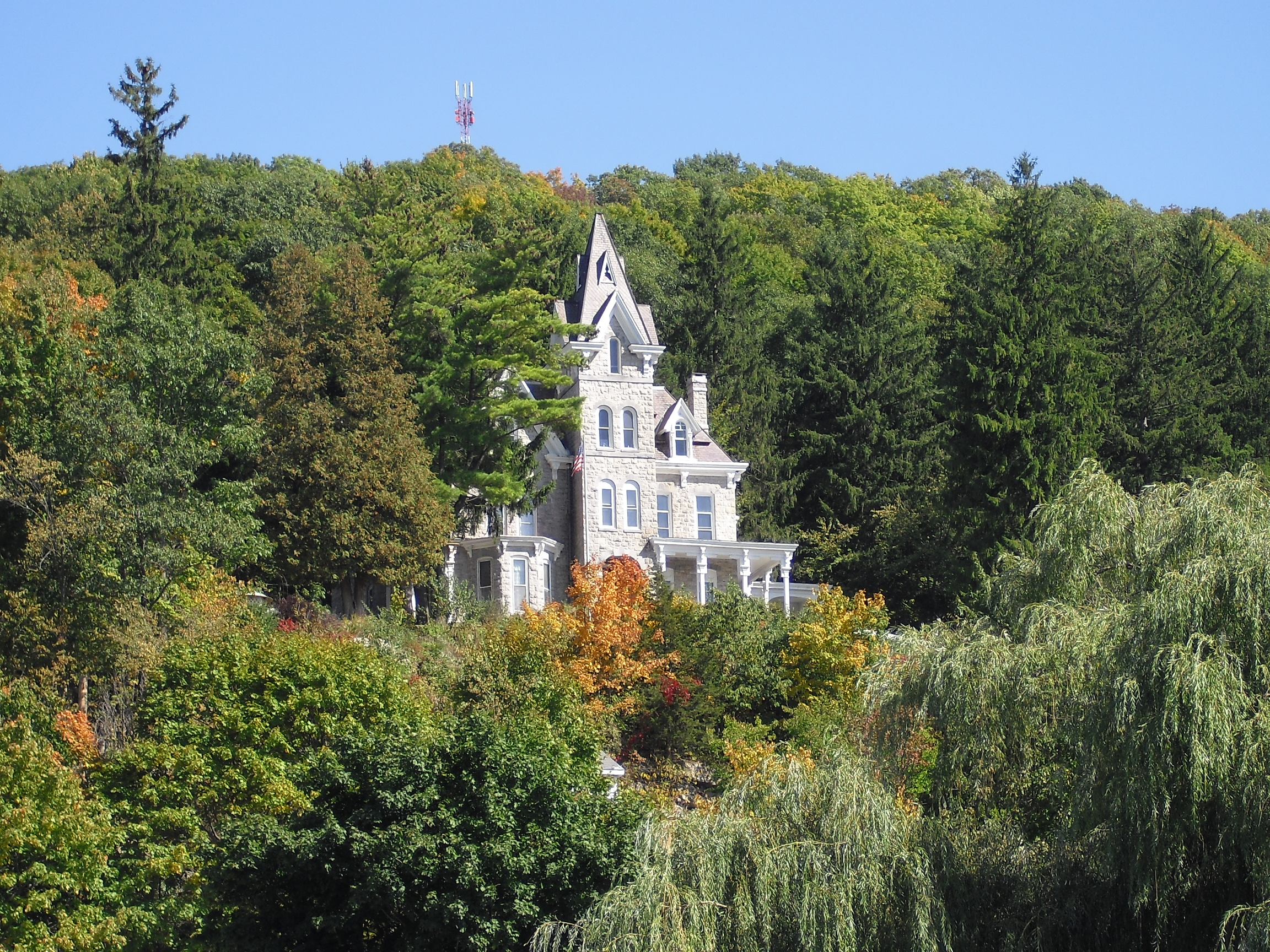

- Location within New York Location within the United States
- Location: Mountain Ter., Whitehall, New York
- Coordinates: 43°33′21″N 73°23′58″W
- Area: 6 acres (2.4 ha)
- Built: 1874
- Architect: Hopson, Almon Chandler
- Architectural style: Late Victorian
- NRHP reference No.: 74001316
- Added to NRHP: May 2, 1974

Skene Manor, listed on the National Register of Historic Places as Judge Joseph Potter House, is a historic home located at Whitehall in Washington County, New York. It was built in 1874 and is a handsome Victorian style mansion built of grey sandstone quarried from its own site with a mansard roof. It features two towers and is embellished with three flat roofed bracketed porches. The center tower is three and one half stories and once featured a large clock that has been removed. The mansion was operated as a restaurant, but is now undergoing restorations and is open for tours.

It was listed on the National Register of Historic Places in 1974.
