= Market East, Indianapolis =

Cultural district in Indianapolis, Indiana, US

Coordinates: 39.76°N 86.15°W

Market East
- Indianapolis Cultural District
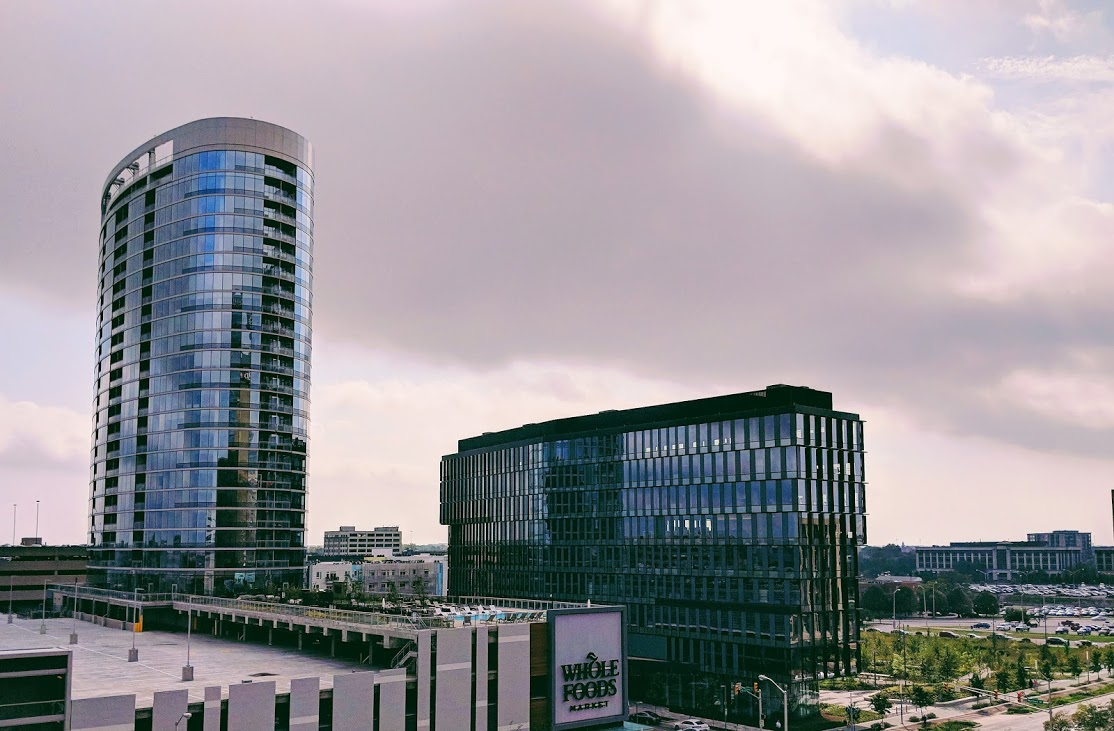
- 360 Market Square (left) Cummins' Indianapolis distribution headquarters (right).
- Interactive map of Market East
- Country: United States
- State: Indiana
- County: Marion
- Time zone: UTC-5 (Eastern (EST))
  - Summer (DST): UTC-4 (EDT)
- Zip code: 46204
- Website: Downtown Indy Inc. – Market East

Market East is a designated cultural district in Indianapolis, Indiana, United States. The district is on the east side of downtown Indianapolis and is bounded to the north by New York Street, to the south by the Indianapolis Union Railway, to the west by Delaware Street and to the east by East Street. Prominent points of interest include the City-County Building, Indianapolis City Market, the Julia M. Carson Transit Center, and Old Indianapolis City Hall.

== History ==
Indianapolis City Market has been serving local residents and businesses since 1886 and was listed on the National Register of Historic Places in 1974. From 1886 to 1958 the area was also home to Tomlinson Hall, a civic center which was located at the northeast corner Delaware and Market streets. After a devastating fire all that remains are the so-called 'Catacombs', the subterranean foundation of the hall.

Old Indianapolis City Hall sits at the south corner of Alabama and Ohio streets. Built in 1910, it served as city hall until 1962 when the City-County Building opened. From 1962 to 2002, the building housed the Indiana State Museum, later serving as the city's main library during construction on an addition to the nearby Central Library. The building has been vacant since 2008. It was listed on the National Register of Historic Places in 1974.

From 1974 through 2001, Market Square Arena occupied a one-block area spanning Market Street. It was demolished to make way for new development that is now Cummins Distribution Headquarters and the 360 Market Square apartments. The Indianapolis City Market and Indianapolis Cultural Trail are located in the area. Since its designation in 2014, the area has added several new high-profile government, residential, and commercial entities including:

- Julia M. Carson Transit Center (2016)
- Cummins Distribution Headquarters and greenspace (2017)
- St. Vincent Center (2017)
- 360 Market Square (2018)
- Richard G. Lugar Plaza (2018)

== Future ==
With a new criminal justice center being built on the southeast side of town, by 2021 the current jail, courts, and sheriff's office will move from their current locations in the Indianapolis City-County Building to their new home. Mayor Joe Hogsett’s Indy 3.0 plan is to reevaluate where and how government offices operate. Ideas include selling public buildings such as the City-County Building and moving the government seat back to the old City Hall at 202 N. Alabama Street.

== See also ==
- Indianapolis Cultural Districts
- List of neighborhoods in Indianapolis
