= Diedrich A. Bohlen =

American architect

- Born: January 17, 1827; Cadenberge, Kingdom of Hanover
- Died: June 1, 1890 (aged 63)
- Resting place: Crown Hill Cemetery, Indianapolis, Indiana, Section 25, Lot 175; 39.8184767°N 86.1704684°W
- Occupation: Architect
- Political party: Republican
- Spouse: Ursula F. (Gonceau) Bohlen

Diedrich Augustus Bohlen (January 17, 1827 – June 1, 1890) was a native of Cadenberge, Kingdom of Hanover who immigrated to the United States around 1851 and founded D. A. Bohlen, Architect in 1853 in Indianapolis, Indiana. In 1971 it became Bohlen, Meyer, Gibson and Associates, and is among the oldest architectural firms in the United States still in operation. Bohlen is best known for introducing the German Neo-Gothic architecture style to Indiana. Bohlen and his firm specialized in institutional projects, especially civic, religious, and educational buildings. More than forty of the firm's projects are listed on the National Register of Historic Places, including several of D. A. Bohlen's designs: Morris-Butler House (1864); Saint John the Evangelist Catholic Church (1871), its rectory (1863), and bishop's residence (1878); Indianapolis's Roberts Park Methodist Church (1876) and Crown Hill Cemetery's Gothic Chapel (1877); and in collaboration with his son, Oscar D. Bohlen, the Indianapolis City Market (1886). The combined campus of Saint Mary-of-the-Woods College and the Sisters of Providence of Saint Mary-of-the-Woods make up the Saint Mary-of-the-Woods Historic District, the largest cohesive collection of Bohlen buildings. The District is of statewide significance on the National Register of Historic Places, for its contribution to architectural, educational and religious history.

Four successive generations of Bohlen architects have worked at the firm: Diedrich A. Bohlen (its founder), Oscar D. Bohlen (Diedrich's son), August C. Bohlen (Diedrich's grandson), and Robert L. Bohlen (Diedrich's great-grandson). In addition to those as Saint Mary-of-the-Woods, D. A. Bohlen and his firm designed many structures for the Sisters of Providence of Saint Mary-of-the-Woods in other locations across Indiana. Bohlen also designed several notable buildings around Indianapolis, including the German-English Independent School (1860), where he also served as a school trustee; United Evangelical Zion Church (1866), later renamed Zion United Church of Christ; the General German Protestant Orphans' Home (1872), later known as Pleasant Run Children's Home; Saint Paul's Evangelical Lutheran Church (1883); and Emmanuel Church (1883), later renamed Lockerbie Square United Methodist Church. In 1882 he remodeled a vacant seminary building for the Daughters of Charity of Saint Vincent de Paul to house Saint Vincent Infirmary, the predecessor to Indianapolis's Saint Vincent Hospital. Prior to his death in 1890, Bohlen collaborated with his son, Oscar, on the design for Tomlinson Hall (1886), located adjacent to the Indianapolis City Market. D. A. Bohlen is buried at Crown Hill Cemetery in Indianapolis.

== Early life and education ==
Bohlen was born on January 17, 1827, in Cadenberge, Kingdom of Hanover, approximately 40 miles (64 km) northwest of Hamburg, Germany. He received his architectural training at Holzminden, and after completion of his formal schooling hiked around northern Germany and Poland studying and sketching the local architecture. Bohlen immigrated to the United States around 1851.

Arriving at New Orleans, Louisiana, Bohlen spent a year in Cincinnati, Ohio, before moving to Indianapolis, Indiana. Bohlen worked for several architects in Indianapolis, including Francis Costigan, who became one of the city's noted architects. Before establishing his own architectural firm in 1853, Bohlen assisted Costigan in completing construction of the Indiana School for the Blind (1851) on North Street in Indianapolis.

== Marriage and family ==
At the time of his death in 1890, Bohlen's residence was at 71 Noble Street in the Fletcher Place neighborhood. He was survived by his wife, Ursula F. (Gonceau) Bohlen, and three children. Oscar Diedrich Bohlen, the youngest of Bohlen's children, was born on July 12, 1863; he became a partner in the Bohlen architectural firm in 1884. August Carl Bohlen (Oscar's son and Diedrich's grandson) and Robert Lesh Bohlen (August's son and Diedrich's great-grandson) later became the third and fourth generations of Bohlen architects to work at the family firm.

== Career ==
Bohlen founded his architectural firm, originally named D. A. Bohlen, Architect, on April 10, 1853, at Indianapolis. His early commissions in Indianapolis included the Charles Mayer store façade (1853), the dome for Odd Fellows Grand Lodge (1854), and the Metropolitan (1858), the city's first theater.

On July 9, 1863, Bohlen enlisted in the Union army, when Governor Oliver P. Morton called for volunteers to defend the state after Confederate General John Hunt Morgan crossed the Ohio River into southern Indiana during the American Civil War. Bohlen served as a private in the 107th Indiana Infantry Regiment, established on July 12, 1863. The 107th Indiana was one of fourteen "Minute Men" regiments and a battalion formed for emergency service during Morgan's Raid. The 107th Indiana was not called into the field and its men were mustered out on July 18, 1863; Bohlen resumed his architectural practice in Indianapolis.

In the 1860s and early 1870s, Bohlen designed several residences for well-to-do families, including Indianapolis's Morris-Butler House (1864), the Crown Hill Cemetery superintendent's home (1869) on the cemetery grounds, and Churchman House (1871), also known as Hillside, for Indianapolis banker Francis M. Churchman on his farm, which later became part of Beech Grove, Indiana.

Bohlen's firm specialized in architectural designs for religious, educational, and civic institutions. Although most of Bohlen's early projects were in the Indianapolis area, an early client was the Sisters of Providence of Saint Mary-of-the-Woods. He designed numerous structures on the campus of Saint Mary-of-the-Woods College, a Roman Catholic liberal arts college near Terre Haute, Indiana. They include Foley Hall (1860), Providence convent chapel (1863), and the Church of the Immaculate Conception (1892). After a fire destroyed the motherhouse in 1889, Oscar Bohlen continued his father's legacy as community architect at Saint Mary-of-the-Woods, designing the Providence convent (1890).

Indianapolis's German community was another source of Bohlen's early commissions. He was the architect for Indianapolis's German-English Independent School (1860) on Maryland Street and the General German Protestant Orphans' Home (1872), later known as Pleasant Run Children's Home, on South State Avenue. Bohlen also designed several churches in Indianapolis, including Saint John the Evangelist Catholic Church (1871), its rectory (1863), and bishop's residence (1878) at Georgia Street and Capitol Avenue; United Evangelical Zion Church (1866) on West Ohio Street, between Meridian and Illinois Streets; and Roberts Park Methodist Church (1876) at Delaware and Vermont Streets.

In 1876 Matthew Roth became Bohlen's business partner, and in 1884, after Bohlen's son, Oscar, joined the firm, it was renamed D. A. Bohlen and Son, Architects. Diedrich Bohlen designed several major projects in Indianapolis before his death in 1890, including Crown Hill Cemetery's Gothic Chapel (1877); Saint Paul's Evangelical Lutheran Church (1883) at McCarty and New Jersey Streets; and Emmanuel Church (1883), later renamed Lockerbie Square United Methodist Church, at East and New York Streets.

In addition to designing new structures, Bohlen altered existing buildings. In 1882 he remodeled a vacant seminary building on East Vermont Street for the Daughters of Charity of Saint Vincent de Paul to house Saint Vincent Infirmary, the predecessor to Indianapolis's Saint Vincent Hospital.

D. A. and Oscar Bohlen collaborated on the Indianapolis City Market (1886), which is still in operation, and Tomlinson Hall (1886), adjacent to the City Market at the corner of Delaware and Market Streets. Tomlinson Hall was destroyed by fire in 1958; however, one of its entrances is preserved as an arch fragment on the market's west plaza.

== Other interests ==
Although D. A. Bohlen was not especially active in Indianapolis's German social or political clubs, he was active in other civic affairs. In 1859 Bohlen was one of the original contributors who established the German-English Independent School in Indianapolis. Bohlen was elected as a trustee of the school in 1859, 1875, and 1876. Bohlen also served as a board member of the Gewerbeschulverein, a German manual training school in Indianapolis, whose classes were held at the German-English Independent School, where his son, Oscar, was a student.

== Death and legacy ==
Bohlen died on June 1, 1890. He is buried at Crown Hill Cemetery, Section 25, Lot 175.

After Bohlen's death, his son, Oscar, continued the family firm, which is among the oldest architectural firms in the United States still in operation. Four successive generations of Bohlen architects once worked at the Indianapolis firm: Diedrich A. Bohlen (its founder), Oscar D. Bohlen (Diedrich's son), August C. Bohlen (Diedrich's grandson), and Robert L. Bohlen (Diedrich's great-grandson).

Bohlen's legacy lies in his designs for numerous historic buildings at Indianapolis and Saint Mary-of-the-Woods, Indiana. He is best known for introducing the German Neo-Gothic architecture style to Indiana. An example of the Romanesque Revival architecture style, called Rundbogenstil, is the Bohlen-designed Indianapolis City Market façade on Market Street. Among the other architectural styles that Bohlen employed in his work include the Romanesque Revival style, as shown in his designs for Emmanuel Church (Lockerbie Square United Methodist Church) and Roberts Park Methodist Church, and the Gothic Revival style of Saint John the Evangelist Catholic Church.

Although Bohlen's firm designed private residences, it specialized in institutional projects, especially religious, educational, and civic buildings. More than twenty of the firm's projects are listed on the National Register of Historic Places, including these Diedrich A. Bohlen designs:

- Morris-Butler House (1864), Indianapolis
- Foley Hall (1860, 1897), Saint Mary of the Woods College (demolished)
- Saint John the Evangelist Catholic Church (1871), rectory (1863), and bishop's residence (1878), Indianapolis
- Roberts Park Methodist Church (1876), Indianapolis
- Indianapolis City Market (1886)
- Crown Hill Cemetery's Gothic Chapel (1877), Indianapolis

The Indiana Historical Society paid tribute to Bohlen's architectural legacy in a 1987 exhibition.

== Notable works ==
Diedrich A. Bohlen-designed structures in Indianapolis:

- Charles Mayer store façade (1853)
- Odd Fellows Grand Lodge dome (1854)
- Metropolitan (1858)
- German-English Independent School (1860)
- Morris Butler House (1864)
- Zion United Church of Christ (1866)
- Crown Hill Cemetery's superintendent's home (1869), destroyed by fire
- Saint John the Evangelist Catholic Church (1871), rectory (1863), and bishop's residence (1878)
- General German Protestant Orphans' Home (1872)
- Roberts Park Methodist Church (1876)
- Crown Hill Cemetery's Gothic Chapel (1877)
- Saint Paul's Evangelical Lutheran Church (1883)
- Emmanuel Church (1883), renamed as Lockerbie Square United Methodist Church

Major structures Diedrich A. Bohlen designed with his son, Oscar D. Bohlen:

- Indianapolis City Market (1886)
- Tomlinson Hall (1886), destroyed by fire

Major Diedrich A. Bohlen-designed structures at Saint Mary-of-the-Woods:

- Providence motherhouse and chapel (1853–4, 1863), destroyed by fire
- Foley Hall (1860), demolished
- Church of the Immaculate Conception (1892)

Other Diedrich A. Bohlen-designed structures:

- Churchman House (1871), Beech Grove, Indiana, demolished
