= 1904 Prohibition National Convention =

American political convention

- 1904 presidential election
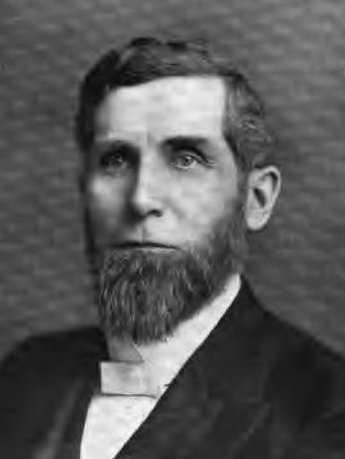
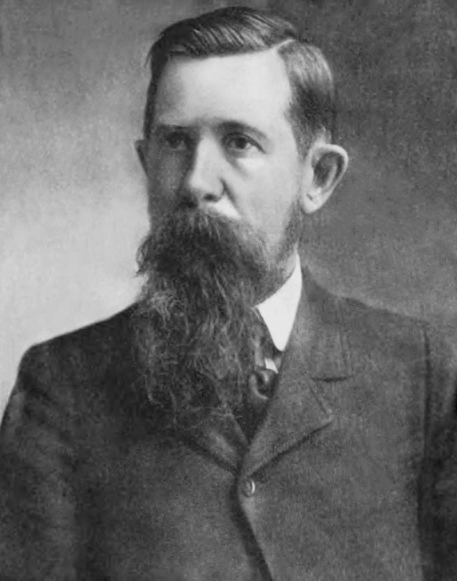
- Nominees (Swallow & Carroll)

Convention
- Date(s): June 29–July 1, 1904
- City: Indianapolis, Indiana
- Venue: Tomlinson Hall

Candidates
- Presidential nominee: Silas C. Swallow of Pennsylvania
- Vice-presidential nominee: George Washington Carroll of Texas

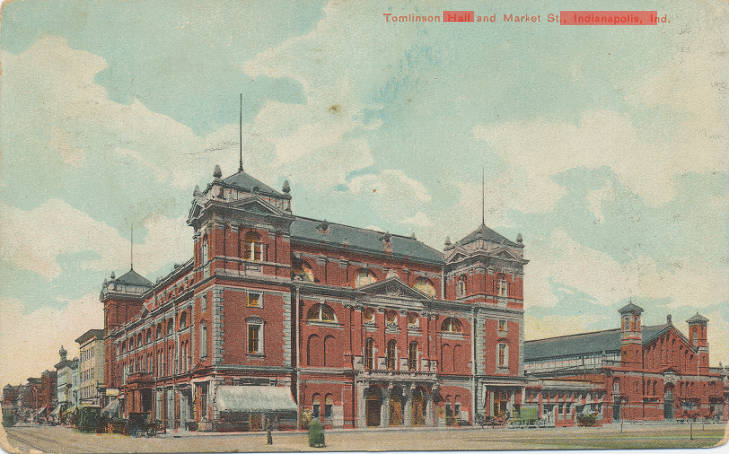
Postcard of Tomlinson Hall, the venue of the convention

The 1904 Prohibition National Convention was held June 29–July 1, 1904 at Tomlinson Hall in Indianapolis, Indiana. It nominated Silas C. Swallow for president and George Washington Carroll for vice president.

== Logistics ==
The Prohibition Party met in Indianapolis from June 29 to July 1. The convention was attended by 758 delegates representing 39 states.

The convention was held inside Tomilnson Hall. The same venue had previously been the site of the party's convention in 1888 Prohibition National Convention.

== Nominations ==
Silas C. Swallow was selected as the party's presidential candidate and George Washington Carroll was selected as the vice-presidential candidate.

Prior to the convention, there had been some consideration of voting to postpone a party decision on a nominee until after the Democrats selected their nominee at the Democratic National Convention.
