= 1896 National Democratic National Convention =

- 1896 presidential election
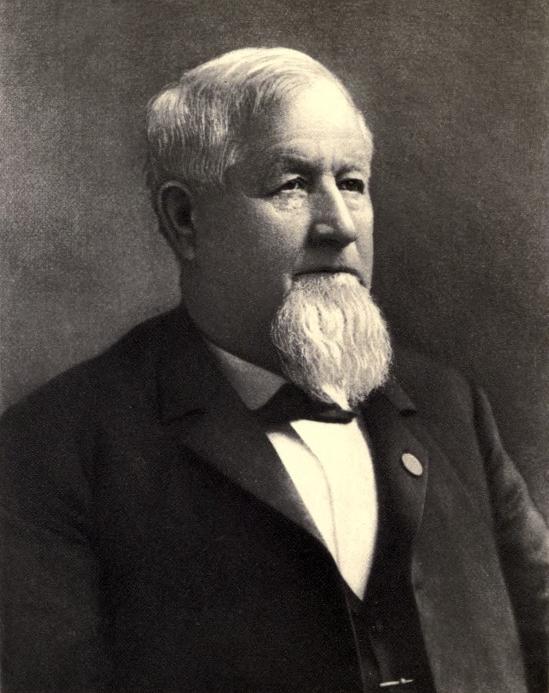
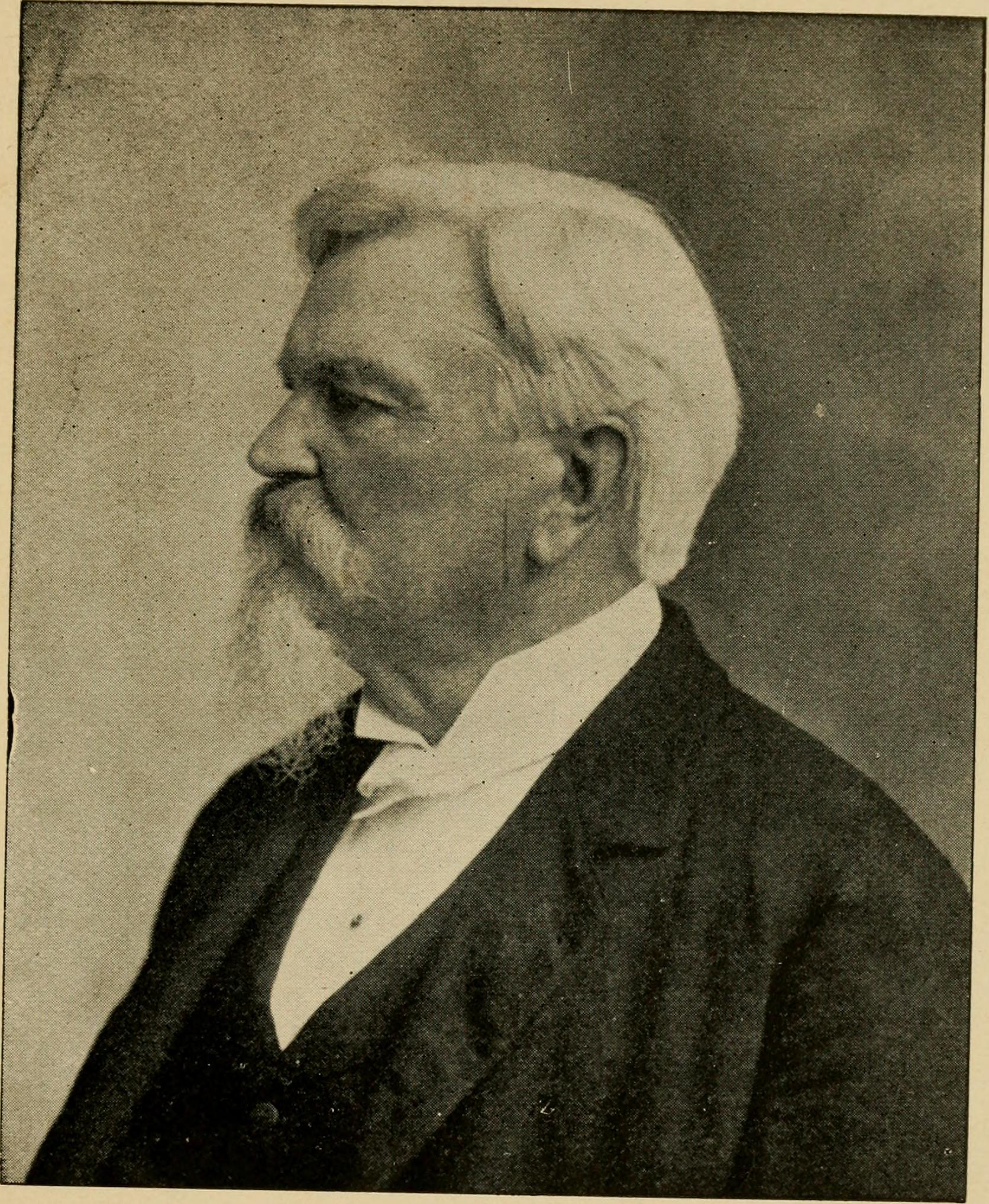
- Nominees (Palmer and Buckner)

Convention
- Dates: September 2–3, 1896
- City: Indianapolis, Indiana
- Venue: Tomlinson Hall

Candidates
- Presidential nominee: John M. Palmer of Illinois
- Vice-presidential nominee: Simon Bolivar Buckner of Kentucky

Voting
- Total delegates: 888
- Results (president): J. M. Palmer: 769.5; E. S. Bragg: 118.5
- Results (vice president): acclamation
- Ballots: 1

The 1896 National Democratic National Convention was a presidential nominating convention held September 2, 1896, in Indianapolis. The convention was a splinter-convention for the National Democratic Party, a splinter faction of the Democratic Party that was organized by gold standard-supporting Democrats unhappy with the regular Democratic Party's nomination of William Jennings Bryan (a gold standard opponent) for president. The convention nominated John M. Palmer for president and Simon Bolivar Buckner for vice president.

== Background ==
The pro-gold Democrats reacted to William Jennings Bryan's nomination for president at the 1896 Democratic National Convention with a mixture of anger, desperation, and confusion. A number of pro-gold Bourbon Democrats urged a "bolt" and the formation of a third party. In response, a hastily arranged assembly was held on July 24 at the Auditorium Annex in Chicago, Illinois, which formed the National Democratic Party. The meeting convened in closed session, and voted to hold its own presidential nominating convention.

A follow-up meeting in August scheduled a nominating convention for September in Indianapolis and issued an appeal to fellow Democrats. In this document, the National Democratic Party portrayed itself as the legitimate heir to Presidents Jefferson, Jackson, and Grover Cleveland.

== Logistics ==
Exterior view sketch of Tomlinson Hall, the venue of the convention

Floor plan of Tomlinson Hall, as arranged for the convention

The convention was held inside Tomlinson Hall in Indianapolis. 888 delegates representing forty-one states and three territories (Note: there were no delegates representing Idaho, Nevada, Utah, or Wyoming) gathered at the convention, held on September 2. At the convention, it was decided that the splinter party would adopt the name "National Democratic Party".

The convention also included meetings of several committees: the national committee, committee on credentials, committee on resolutions, committee on permanent organization, committee on rules, and committee to notify the presidential nominee.

In Preparation for the convention, buildings along the main roads in the city of Indianapolis were decked with American flags and bunting. Hotels decorated their public spaces with red, white, and blue accents and portraits of prominent Democratic Party figures, including presidents Jefferson, Jackson, Cleveland; as well as former vice president Adlai Stevenson and past Democratic presidential nominees Winfield Scott Hancock and Samuel Tilden. Minimal decoration was placed on the Indiana Statehouse, while the county and city buildings were heavily decorated.

== Nominations ==
Some delegates planned to nominate former president Cleveland, but they relented after a telegram arrived stating that he would not accept the nomination. Senator William Freeman Vilas from Wisconsin, the main drafter of the National Democratic Party's platform, was a favorite of the delegates. However, Vilas refused to run as the party's sacrificial lamb. The choice instead was John M. Palmer, a 79-year-old former senator from Illinois. This was despite palmer too having made an efforts to communicate his disinterest in being nominated. Simon Bolivar Buckner, a 73-year-old former governor of Kentucky, was nominated by acclamation for vice-president. The ticket, symbolic of post-Civil War reconciliation, featured the oldest combined age of the candidates in American history.

=== Presidential nomination ===
Candidates in this section are sorted by their highest vote count on the nominating ballots, then by reverse date of withdrawal
John M. Palmer	Edward S. Bragg	Henry Watterson	James Broadhead	Daniel W. Lawler	Grover Cleveland
U.S. Senator from Illinois (1891–1897)	U.S. Ambassador to Mexico from Wisconsin (1888–1889)	U.S. Representative for Kentucky's 5th (1876–1877)	U.S. Representative for Missouri's 9th (1883–1885)	Attorney-at-Law from Minnesota	22nd and 24th U.S. President from New York (1885–1889; 1893–1897)
757.5 votes	130.5 votes	W:On First Ballot	DTBN	DTBN	DTBN

Presidential balloting
Ballot	1st before shifts	1st after shifts
John M. Palmer	757.5	769.5
Edward S. Bragg	130.5	118.5

=== Vice presidential nomination ===
Simon Bolivar Buckner was nominated for vice president by acclamation.

== Platform ==
The convention unanimously adopted a party platform.

== Aftermath ==
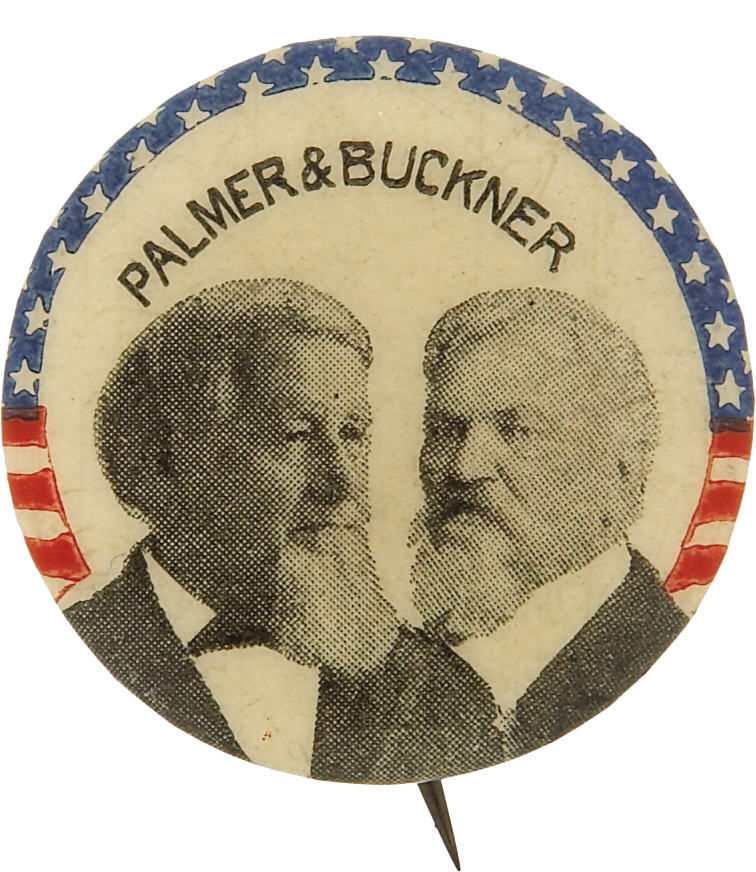
Palmer/Buckner campaign button

Despite their advanced ages, Palmer and Buckner embarked on a busy speaking tour, including visits to most major cities in the East. This won them considerable respect from the party faithful, although some found it hard to take the geriatric campaigning seriously. "You would laugh yourself sick could you see old Palmer," wrote lawyer Kenesaw Mountain Landis. "He has actually gotten it into his head he is running for office." The Palmer ticket was considered to be a vehicle to elect McKinley for some Gold Democrats, such as William Collins Whitney and Abram Hewitt, the treasurer of the National Democratic Party, and they received quiet financial support from Mark Hanna. Palmer himself said at a campaign stop that if "this vast crowd casts its vote for William McKinley next Tuesday, I shall charge them with no sin." There was even some cooperation with the Republican Party, especially in finances. The Republicans hoped that Palmer could draw enough Democratic votes from Bryan to tip marginal Midwestern and border states into McKinley's column. In a private letter, Hewitt underscored the "entire harmony of action" between both parties in standing against Bryan.

However, the National Democratic Party was not merely an adjunct to the McKinley campaign. An important goal was to nurture a loyal remnant for future victory. Repeatedly they depicted Bryan's prospective defeat, and a credible showing for Palmer, as paving the way for ultimate recapture of the Democratic Party, and this did indeed happen in 1904.

The Palmer-Buckner ticket remains the only third-party presidential campaign in history to have earned the endorsement of the New York Times.
