= St. John the Evangelist Catholic Church (Indianapolis, Indiana) =

Historic church in Indiana, United States

- Saint John Church and Rectory
- U.S. National Register of Historic Places
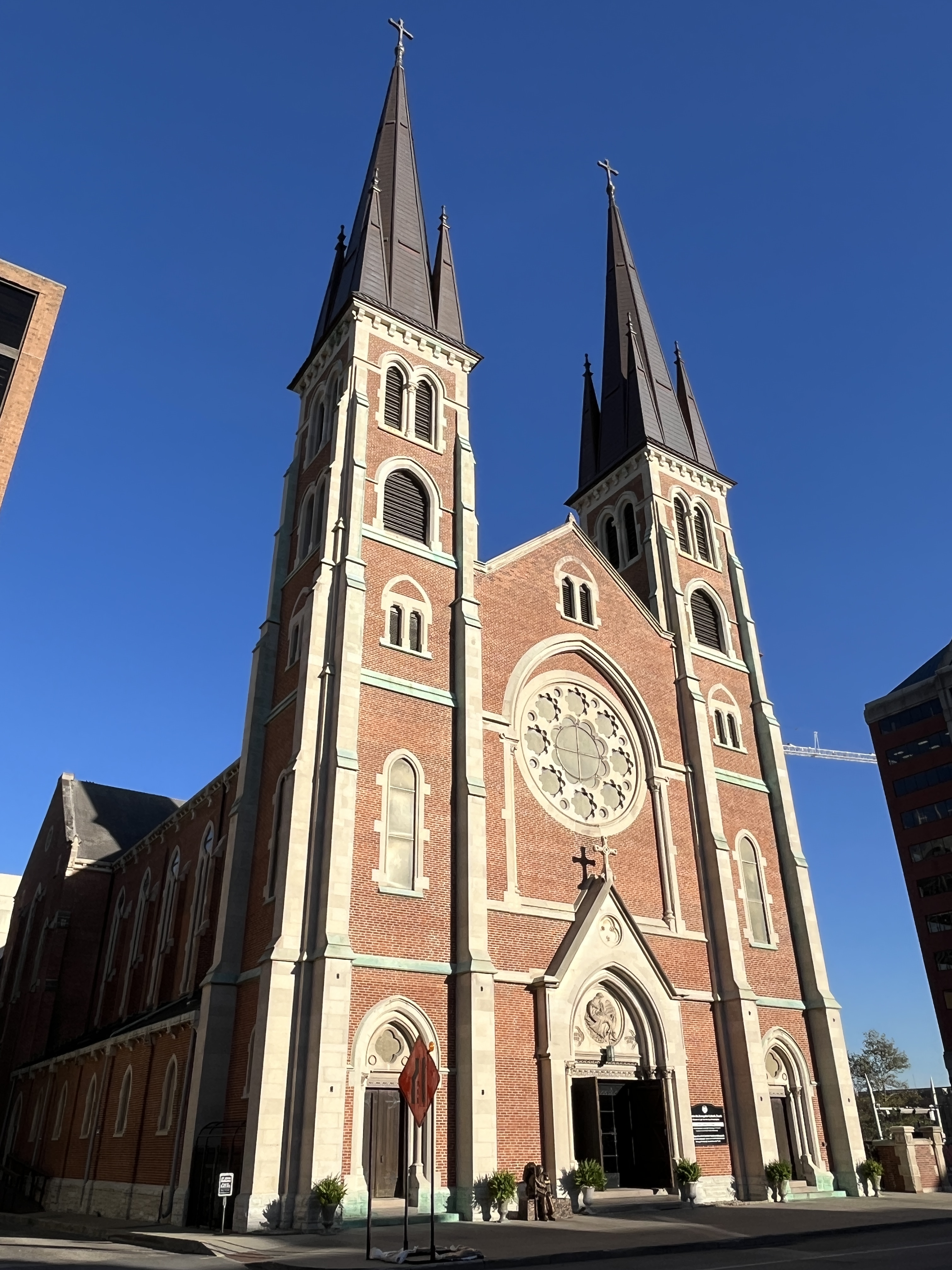
- Front view of the church in 2024

- Location within Indiana Location within the United States
- Location: 121 South Capitol Avenue; 124 and 126 West Georgia Street; Indianapolis, Indiana
- Coordinates: 39°45′52″N 86°9′41″W
- Built: 1863–1871
- Architect: Diedrich A. Bohlen
- Architectural style: French Gothic Revival and American Romanesque Revival
- NRHP reference No.: 80000061
- Added to NRHP: September 17, 1980

Saint John the Evangelist Catholic Church is a Catholic parish of the Archdiocese of Indianapolis in Indianapolis, Indiana, United States. The parish's origins date to 1837, when it was first named Holy Cross parish. In 1850 it was renamed Saint John the Evangelist parish, and is the oldest Catholic parish in the city and in Marion County, Indiana. Considered the mother of the Catholic parishes in Indianapolis, it played an important role in development of the Catholic Church in the city. Saint John's Church served as the pro-cathedral of the diocese from 1878 until 1906; its rectory served as the bishop's residence and chancery from 1878 until 1892. In 1900 the church served as the site of first episcopal consecration held in Indianapolis.

Although many considered Saint John's a diocesan cathedral, it was never officially named as such. Saint Francis Xavier Cathedral remained the official cathedral and Vincennes, Indiana, as the see city for the Roman Catholic Diocese of Vincennes, Indiana, until March 28, 1898, when the episcopal see was transferred to Indianapolis and became the Diocese of Indianapolis. Diocesan functions continued to be held at Saint John's until Saints Peter and Paul Cathedral was built in 1906. Saint John's rectory continued to house the diocesan chancery until 1968, and served as the metropolitan tribunal for the diocese until 1982. Saint John's Church and rectory were placed on the National Register of Historic Places in 1980.

The present-day Saint John's Church, the parish's third and the second one built on the Georgia Street property, is the main structure in a group of parish buildings on the southwest corner of Georgia Street and Capitol Avenue. Diedrich A. Bohlen, principal and founder of the Indianapolis architectural firm of D. A. Bohlen and Son, designed the rectory (1863), church (1867–71), and a rectory addition (1878). Bohlen's son, Oscar, designed the twin spires and supervised their construction in 1893. The red-brick church has an eclectic style, including elements of French Gothic Revival and American Romanesque Revival architecture. The church has a seating capacity of 3,000. It was the largest church in Indiana when the cornerstone was laid in 1867; it was dedicated on July 2, 1871.

== History ==
=== Saint Johns parish ===
Holy Cross parish, the predecessor to Saint John the Evangelist, is the oldest Catholic parish in Indianapolis and in Marion County, Indiana. It is considered the mother of the Catholic parishes in Indianapolis, and played an important role in development of the Catholic Church in the city. The parish's origins date to 1837, when Father Vincent Bacquelin held the first regularly celebrated mass in Indianapolis at a local tavern. Father Bacquelin founded Holy Cross parish in November 1837 after the Diocese of Vincennes purchased a lot for the parish's first church on the northwest corner of Washington and California Streets, just south of Military Park. The new frame church, which measured about 40 feet (12 m) by 24 feet (7.3 m), was known as the Chapel of the Holy Cross. The first mass was held in the church on October 11, 1840.

In 1846 Bishop Célestine de la Hailandière purchased three lots on Georgia Street, where it intersects Tennessee Street (present-day Capitol Avenue), for $2,300. The lots served as the site for a cluster of new buildings that would be built for the parish. In 1850 a new brick church measuring 80 feet (24 m) by 40 feet (12 m) was built on the center lot facing south on Georgia Street, adjacent to the site of the present-day rectory. Father John Guéguen, the parish pastor at the time, changed the name of the parish to Saint John the Evangelist when the new church was completed. (Saint John the Evangelist was Father Bacquelin's patron saint.)

Father Bacquelin's successor, Augustus Bessonies, served as pastor at Saint Johns from 1857 to 1890, when the parish expanded to include a new church, rectory, and school buildings on Georgia Street. In 1859 a new parish school was constructed at the corner of Georgia and Tennessee Streets (present-day Capitol Avenue) to house Saint Johns Academy, the city's first Catholic school. Founded by the Sisters of Providence of Saint Mary-of-the-Woods, the school opened in September 1859. It remained at the site until Saint Johns Academy for Girls opened at 135 West Maryland Street in January 1874. The Georgia Street school building was later demolished. Saint Johns Academy on Maryland Street closed in 1959, and the building was demolished. In 1863 the parish built a new rectory adjacent to Saint Johns Church, and in 1867 a three-story brick school for boys. The Brothers of the Sacred Heart operated the school until 1929, and the building was later demolished.

Construction on the present-day Saint Johns Church began in April 1867, and the main building was completed in 1871. (Due to the expense the twin spires were not added until 1893.) In the early 1870s, when the Bishop of Vincennes, Jacques Maurice de St. Palais, visited Indianapolis, he resided at Saint Johns rectory and used the church as his proto-cathedral. Although the bishop considered making Indianapolis the episcopal see of the Diocese of Vincennes, he deferred the decision to Silas Chatard, his successor.

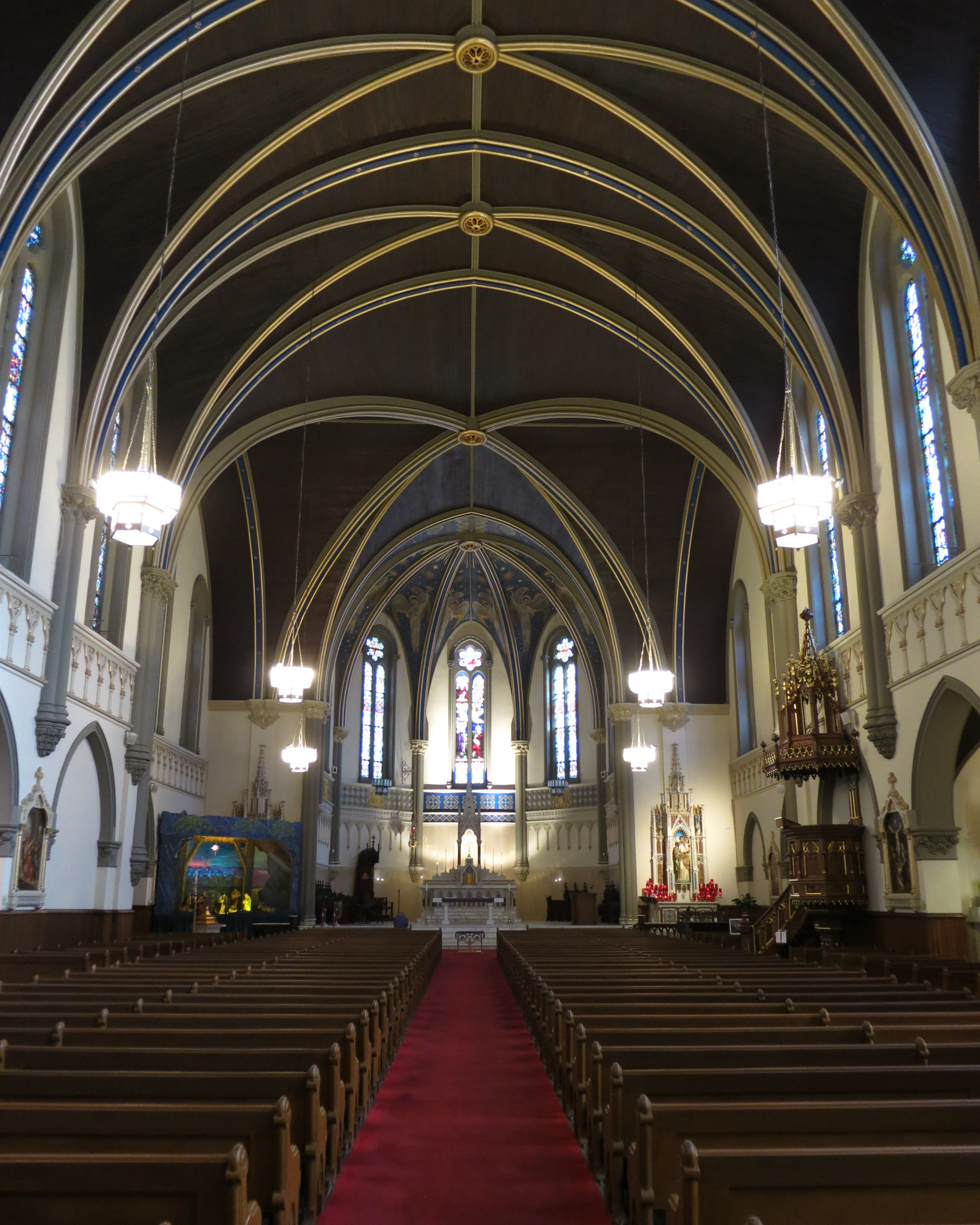
The church nave with Christmas decoration.

Saint Johns served as the proto-cathedral of the diocese from 1878, when Bishop Silas Chatard established his residence and chancery there, until 1906, when Saints Peter and Paul Cathedral was built in Indianapolis. Although Bishop St. Palais temporarily resided at Saint Johns when he visited Indianapolis, his successor, Bishop Chatard, formally obtained permission from Pope Leo XIII to establish the bishop's residence at Indianapolis. After Chatard's consecration as Bishop of Vincennes on May 12, 1878, in Rome, Italy, he traveled to Indiana and arrived in Indianapolis on August 17, 1878. Within a month after his arrival in the city, Bishop Chatard commissioned noted Indianapolis architect Diedrich A. Bohlen, principal and founder of the architectural firm of D. A. Bohlen and Son, to design an addition to Saint Johns rectory that would service as the bishop's residence and house the diocesan chancery. The rectory addition served as the bishop's residence from August 1878 until April 18, 1892, when Bishop Chatard moved into the newly built rectory at Fourteenth and Meridian Streets in the Saint Peter and Paul parish.

When Bishop Chatard moved to Indianapolis in 1878, many considered Saint Johns as a diocesan cathedral, but it was never officially named as such. Saint Francis Xavier Cathedral remained the official cathedral and Vincennes, Indiana, as the see city for the Diocese of Vincennes until March 28, 1898, when Pope Leo XIII officially transferred the episcopal see to Indianapolis and it became the Diocese of Indianapolis. Because Saints Peter and Paul Cathedral, the new cathedral for the Diocese of Indianapolis, was not built until 1906, diocesan functions continued to be held at Saint Johns Church in the interim. Bishop Chatard called four diocesan synods (in 1878, 1880, 1886, and 1891) during his residency at Saint Johns. Some functions remained at Saint Johns even longer. Its rectory continued to house the diocesan chancery until 1968, and it served as the metropolitan tribunal for the diocese until 1982.

Father Bessonies's successor, Monsignor Francis H. Gavisk became vicar general for the Diocese of Indianapolis and was Saint Johns pastor from 1890 to 1932. He continued work to complete the church in 1893. On May 12, 1903, Bishop Chatard celebrated his Silver Episcopal Jubilee with a Pontifical High Mass at Saint Johns. The celebration marked the last significant diocesan event at the church.

The church was restored for its centennial anniversary in 1971. Saint Johns church and rectory were placed in the National Register of Historic Places in 1980. In 1985 Saint Johns church once again served as the proto-cathedral for some liturgical functions of the diocese, including ordinations, when Saints Peter and Paul Cathedral underwent a major renovation.

=== Church and rectory construction ===
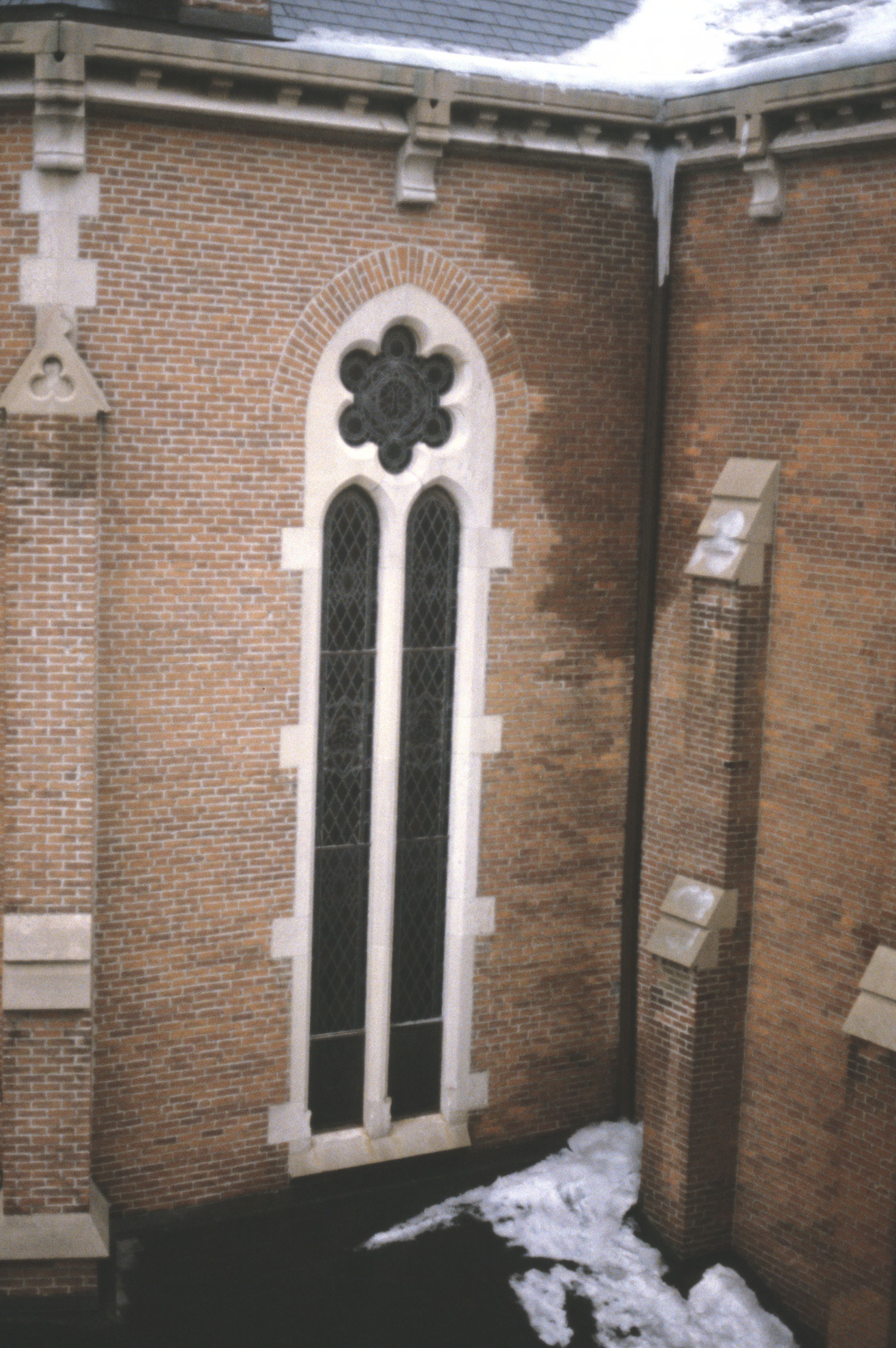
Detail of St. John Catholic Church from 1978

Saint Johns Church is the main structure in a cluster of parish buildings on the southwest corner of Georgia Street and Capitol Avenue. Construction of these building was completed in phases. Diedrich A. Bohlen designed the rectory (1863), the present-day Saint Johns Church (1867–71), and bishop's residence/rectory addition (1878). (Other D. A. Bohlen-designed buildings related to the parish include Saint Johns school for boys (1867), across the alley from the rectory, and the Saint Johns Academy for Girls (1872–74), on nearby Maryland Street.) Bohlen's son, Oscar, designed the twin spires on the two towers that flank the main facade and supervised their construction. The Bohlen-designed red-brick, two-story rectory (1863), which predates the present-day church, faces south on Georgia Street. The rectory addition built on the site of the old Saint Johns Church was completed in July 1879. The estimated cost to construct the addition and a brick passageway to the church's sacristy was $10,000 at the time of the construction.

Construction on the present-day church, the second one on the Georgia Street site, began in 1867. Funds from private donors and parish fund-raising efforts paid for construction of the church, which cost an estimated $120,000 at the time it was built. Unlike the first church on the site, which faced Georgia Street, the present-day church faces west on Capitol Avenue. Bishop St. Palais laid the cornerstone on July 21, 1867. John B. Purcell, Archbishop of Cincinnati, dedicated the new church on July 2, 1871. Due to the expense, the twin spires were not added until 1893. Saint Johns was closed from February 1893 to September 14, 1893, to construct the spires, install a pipe organ, and decorate the interior.

== Description ==
The present-day Saint Johns Church has an eclectic style, including elements of French Gothic Revival and American Romanesque Revival architecture.

=== Exterior and plan ===
The church is constructed of red brick laid in a modified Flemish bond and white limestone corner buttresses over a limestone foundation. It has an arched main entrance, a square cupola, and twin spires. The basic cruciform plan includes a shallow transept, nave, and a half-octagon apse. The sanctuary has a seating capacity of 3,000. Saint Johns was the largest church in Indiana when the cornerstone was laid in 1867. The church measures 75 feet (23 m) wide, 202.5 feet (61.7 m) long, and 53 feet (16 m) tall. Its twin spires are 194 feet (59 m) tall.

The main facade facing Capitol Avenue is divided into three sections with three portals faced in stone. The three-story gabled center section contains the main entrance with large wooden doors. Limestone Corinthian order columns support a compound Gothic arch. The stone tympanum above the main portal includes Joseph Quarmby's life-size representation of John the Evangelist pondering the scriptures, and the church's construction dates (1867 and 1871) are inscribed in stone over the main entrance. A half-circle stone cap bears the inscription "D.O.M. " (Deo optimo maximo), meaning "To God, the Best and Greatest." A gabled parapet with a blind trefoil and a cross surmounts the arch. A rose window is installed in the center at the second-story level. The facade's two tower sections, topped with identical copper spires on the left and right, include an additional entrance with wooden doors. Each tower has four upper levels separated by belted courses and include openings at each level.

=== Interior ===
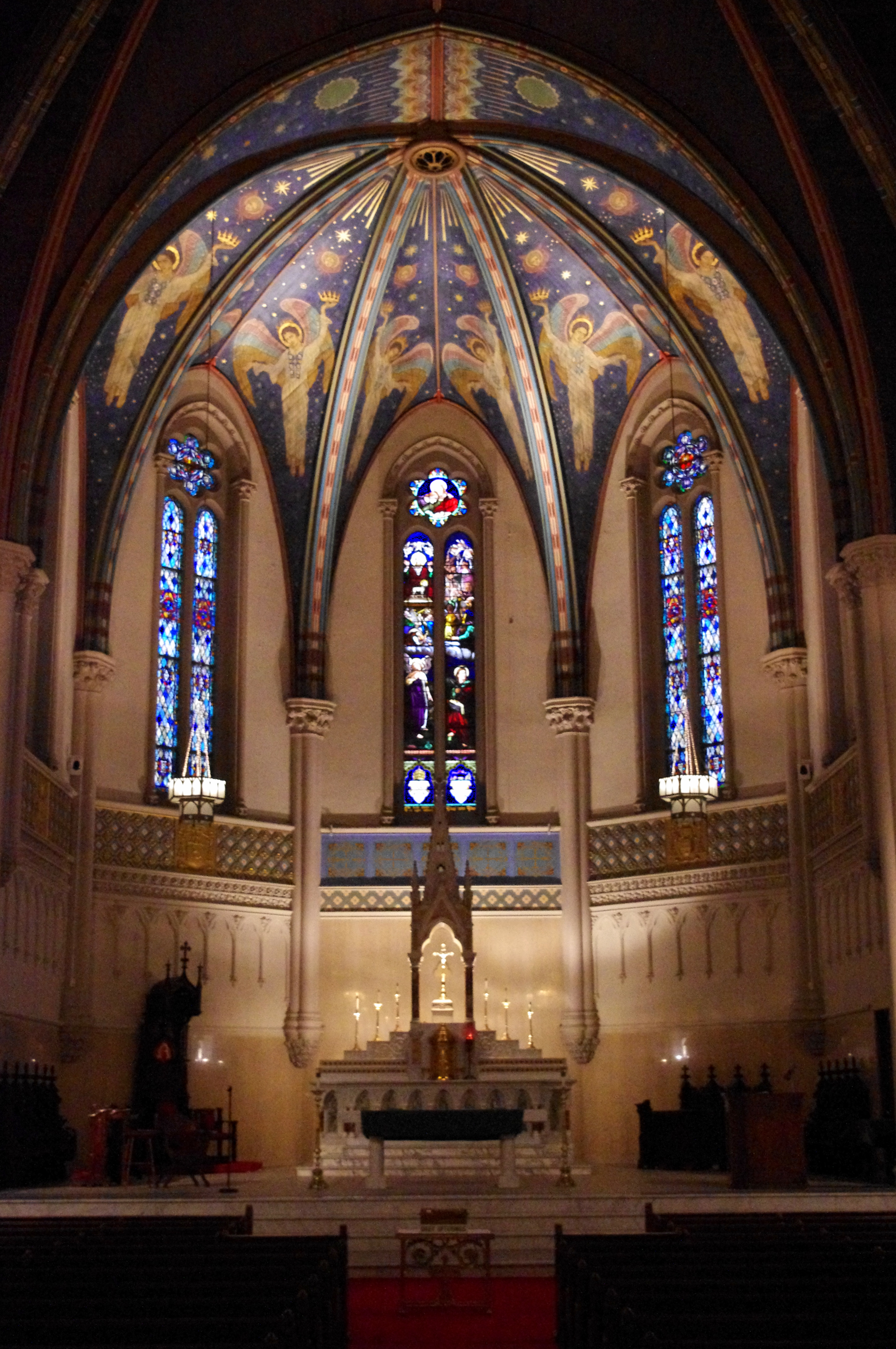
Church sanctuary

The Gothic sanctuary includes Corinthian columns and ribbed vaulting. An organ and choir gallery is built at the rear of the nave, above the narthex. The curved ceiling with poplar ribs is painted in a light color. Guy Leber, an Italian-Swiss painter from Louisville, Kentucky, painted the ceiling of the apse with The Angels of Glory (white-robed angels and halo-crowned seraphs).

The church's original walls included oak wainscoting extending 5 feet (1.5 m) from the floor, a painted wall, and a simple border. Stonecarver Henry R. Sanders made the interior capitals and pillars in staff (plaster of Paris and manila fiber cast in a gelato mold) The four coats of arms, also in staff, of Pope Pius IX, Bishop St. Palais, Pope Leo XIII, and Bishop Chatard, who were the leaders of the Catholic Church and the Diocese of Vincennes when construction of the church began and when it was completed, were installed on the sanctuary's walls in 1893. Statues of the Virgin Mary and Saint Joseph flank the apse. L. Chovet of Paris, France, provided paintings for the Stations of the Cross. The high altar, made of Italian marble, and French Gothic pulpit, made of quartered oak, were added in 1893. The church's original pews were constructed of black walnut. A mosaic tile floor, installed in 1905, replaced carpeting.

The church contains four chapels along the nave, two on each side. The Saint Patrick and Pietà chapels on the right were gifts of Bishop Chatard; the Sacred Heart and Saint Anne chapels were gifts of Father Bessonies. The Saint Patrick Chapel contains a statue of Saint Patrick, patron saint of Ireland; the Pietà chapel contains a statue of the Mother of Sorrows; the Sacred Heart Chapel contains a statue of the Sacred Heart; and the Saint Anne Chapel includes an altar and statue of Saint Anne and her daughter, the Virgin Mary. Each of the four side chapels contains two art nouveau-style glass windows that were installed in 1893.

Twenty-five leaded-glass windows were installed in the church's exterior walls. The original rose window on the west façade was destroyed in a hailstorm in 1923. The Emil Frei Art Glass Company designed its replacement, which depicts Saint John on the island of Patmos; it was installed in 1924. Musicians and musical instruments surround the central design. The stained-glass window in the center of the apse was a gift from Bishop St. Palais; it depicts Saint John's vision in the Apocalypse. The art-glass window in the former baptistery depicts Christ's baptism in the Jordan River. Twenty of the remaining twenty-two windows were designed in 1942 by Henry Keck Studios of Syracuse, New York.

A pipe organ built in 1989 is installed in the organ gallery at the rear of the sanctuary. Its organ case comes from the original instrument, installed in 1894 that was destroyed during a hailstorm in 1923. A portion of the pipework was retained from a previous organ built for the church in 1935.

Alterations to the original interior when it was refurbished in 1971 included repositioning the altar to face the congregation, moving the baptismal font to the left transept, and removal of communion rails.

=== Rectory ===
The rectory was built in two phases. The two-story east section was built in 1863. The three-story bishop's residence and chancery was built in 1879. The bishop's residence is attached to the rectory's east side. Both buildings face Georgia Street and are constructed of red brick laid in Flemish bond and trimmed in limestone. The 1863 building is constructed over a limestone foundation and includes a three-bay façade with steps leading to the entrance. The rectory's façade has a Flemish gable and a Tudor-Gothic arch that shelters the entrance door, sidelights, and transom. The 1879 addition is more Victorian in style. Its openings are arched, and the front façade features a two-story bay. A red-brick wall in Flemish bond separates the rectory and addition from Georgia Street.

== Ordinations ==
Auxiliary bishop Denis O'Donaghue was consecrated at Saint Johns Church on April 25, 1900; it was the first episcopal consecration held in Indianapolis.

== Membership ==
Membership declined for several decades after the turn of the century, when local families began to leave the downtown area and move to the city's suburbs. Parish membership of 3,000 in the 1880s had decreased to less than 30 by the 1970s. In 1971, the church's centennial, it assumed a new ministry to serve Indianapolis visitors and downtown workers. The church's location across the street from the Indianapolis Convention Center and its proximity to downtown hotels and attractions makes it a convenient gathering place for convention attendees and other visitors. As of 2017 parish membership has increased to 1200 households.

== See also ==
- List of Catholic cathedrals in the United States
- List of cathedrals in the United States
- National Register of Historic Places listings in Center Township, Marion County, Indiana
