= 1912 Socialist National Convention =

American presidential nominating convention

- 1912 presidential election
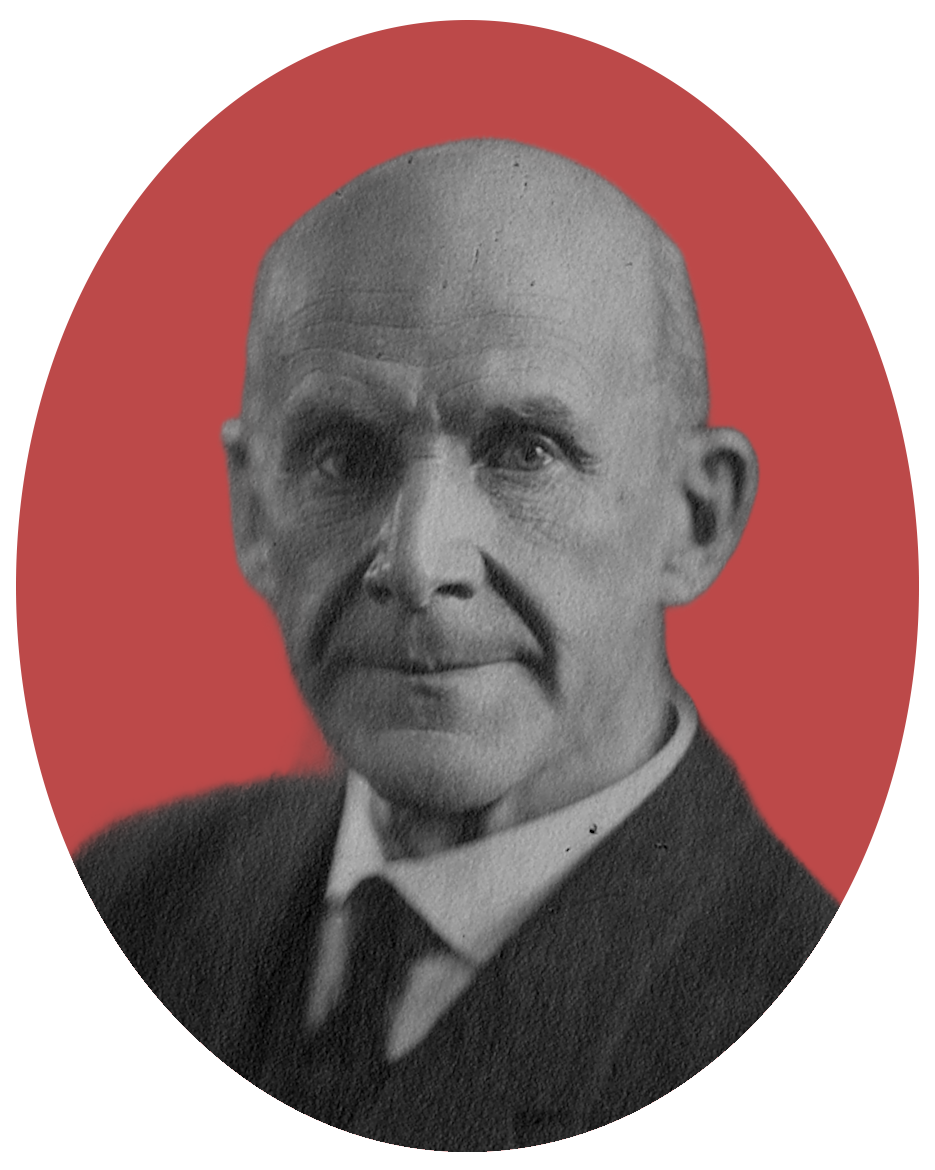
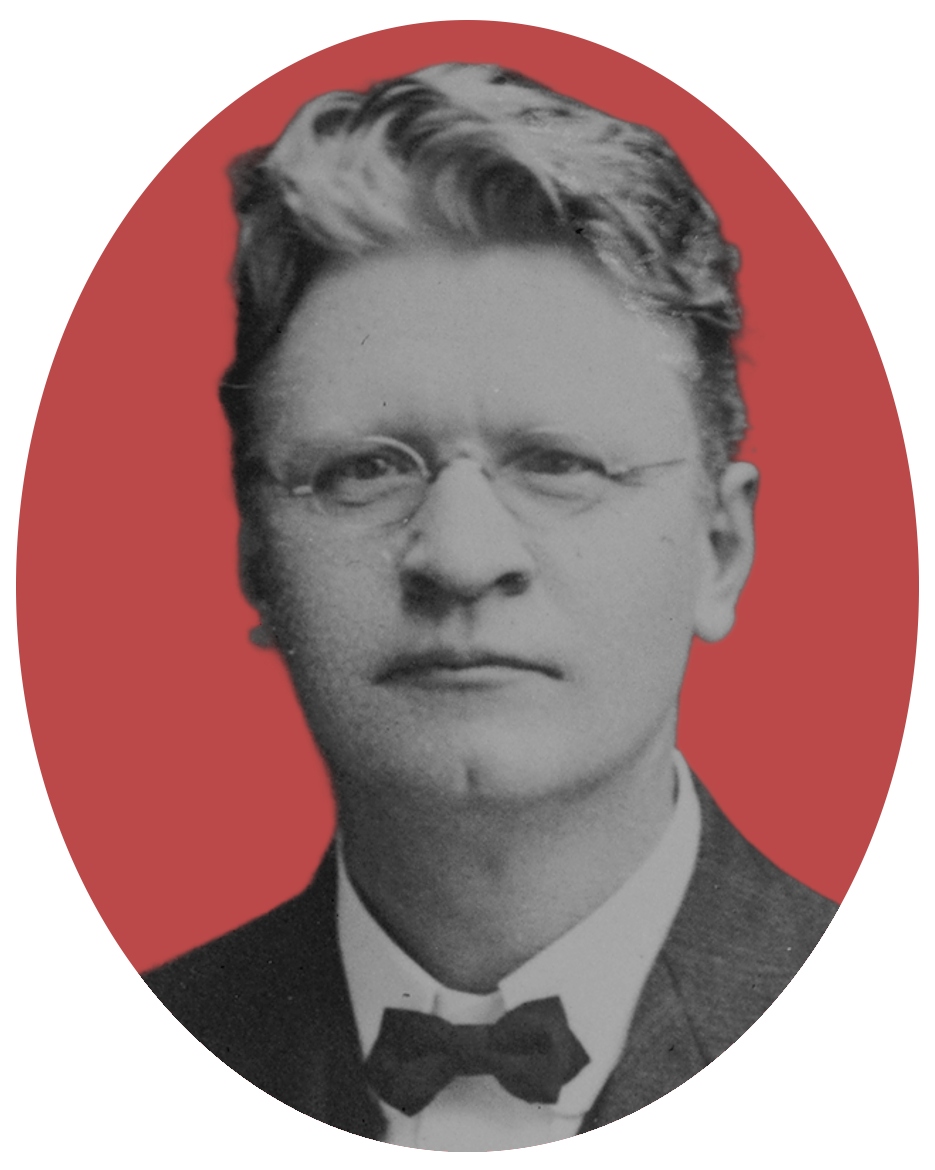
- Nominees; Debs and Seidel

Convention
- Dates: May 12–18, 1912
- City: Indianapolis, Indiana
- Venue: Tomlinson Hall

Candidates
- Presidential nominee: Eugene V. Debs of Indiana
- Vice-presidential nominee: Emil Seidel of Wisconsin

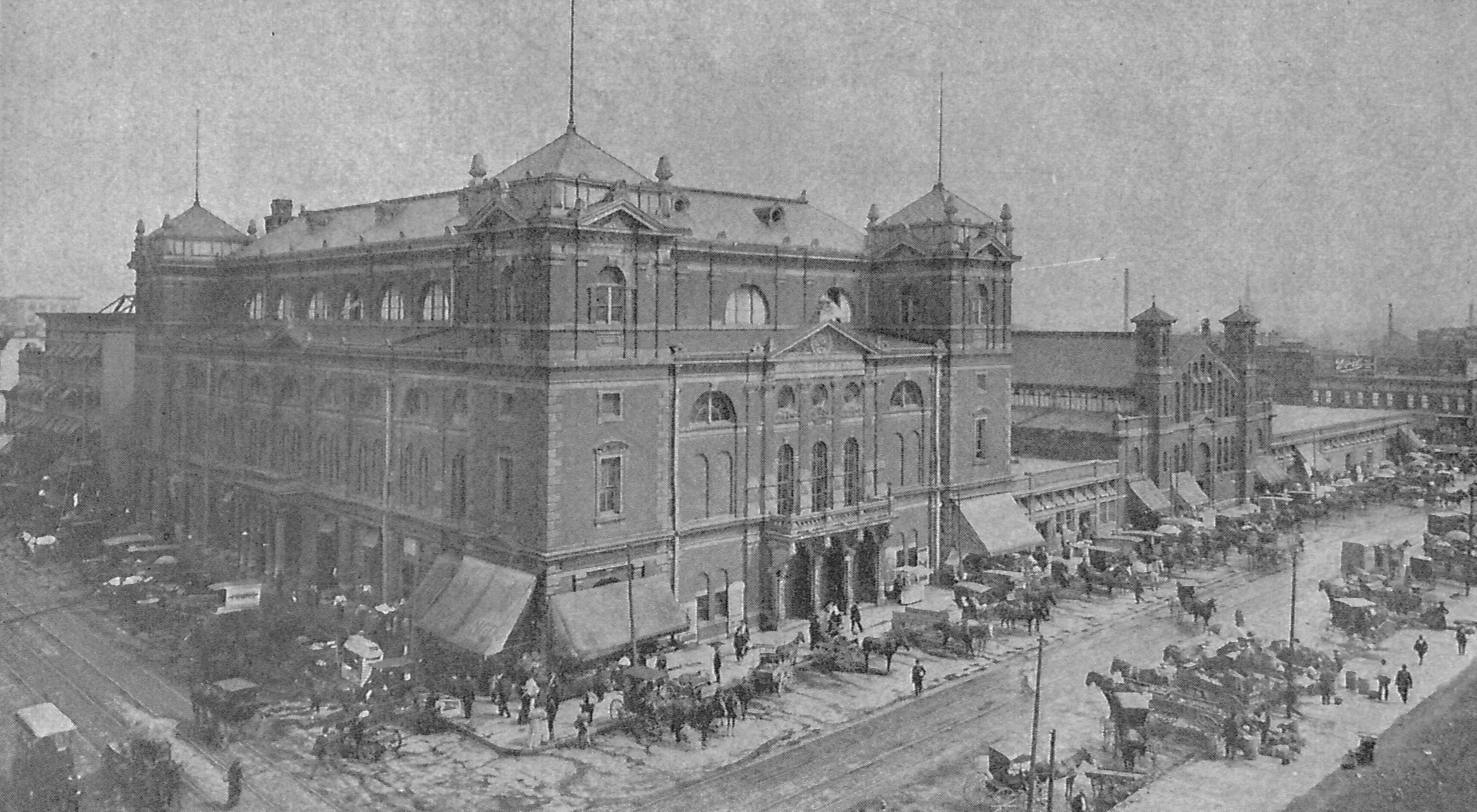
Tomlinson Hall

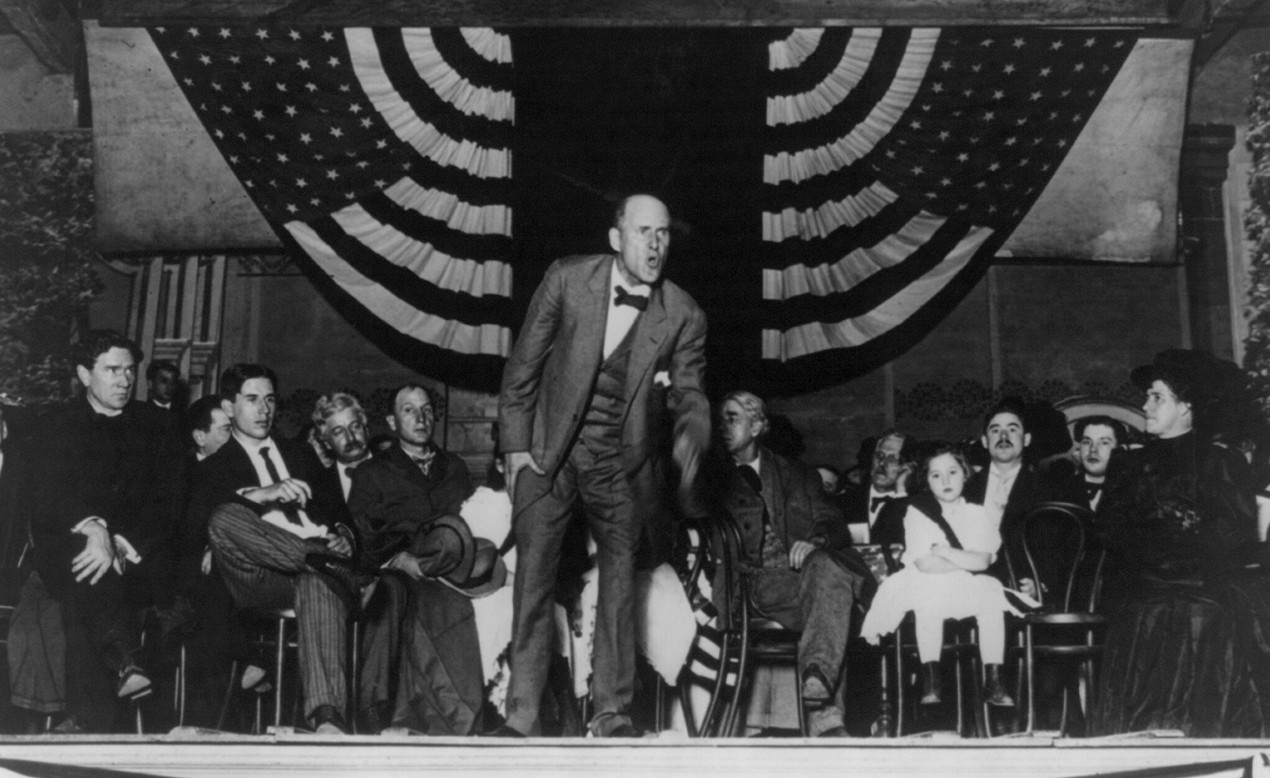
Debs delivering a speech during the campaign

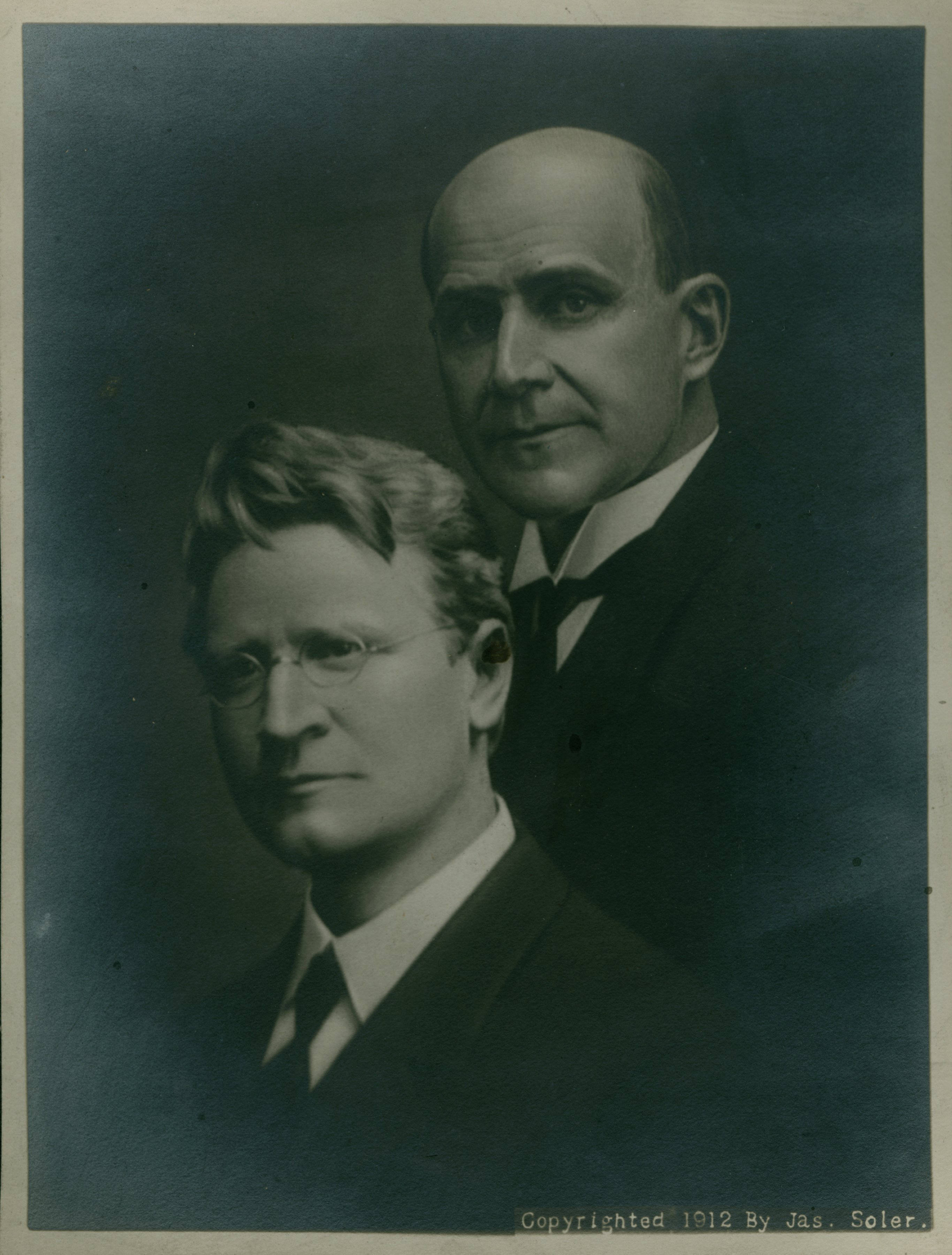
Debs and Seidel

The 1912 Socialist National Convention was held in Tomlinson Hall in Indianapolis from May 12 to May 18, 1912. It saw the Socialist Party of America again nominate Eugene V. Debs for president. Debs had been its presidential nominee in the previous two presidential elections. For vice president, the convention nominated Emil Seidel, the former mayor of Milwaukee.

== The Convention ==
The convention was held at the Tomlinson Hall in Indianapolis from May 12 to May 18, 1912.

The convention was called to order by party national secretary John M. Work and roll was called by delegate Gustave Strebel. Party co-founder Morris Hillquit of New York served as chairman.

The Party leadership constructed an agenda to address pressing issues relevant to the Party's political orientation such as nominating presidential candidates to run. The leadership also sought input on topics of using direct action instead of only participating in electoral politics. The topic of direct action surfaced as the Industrial Workers of the World (IWW) led a recent strike known as the Lawrence Strike.

=== Presidential candidates ===
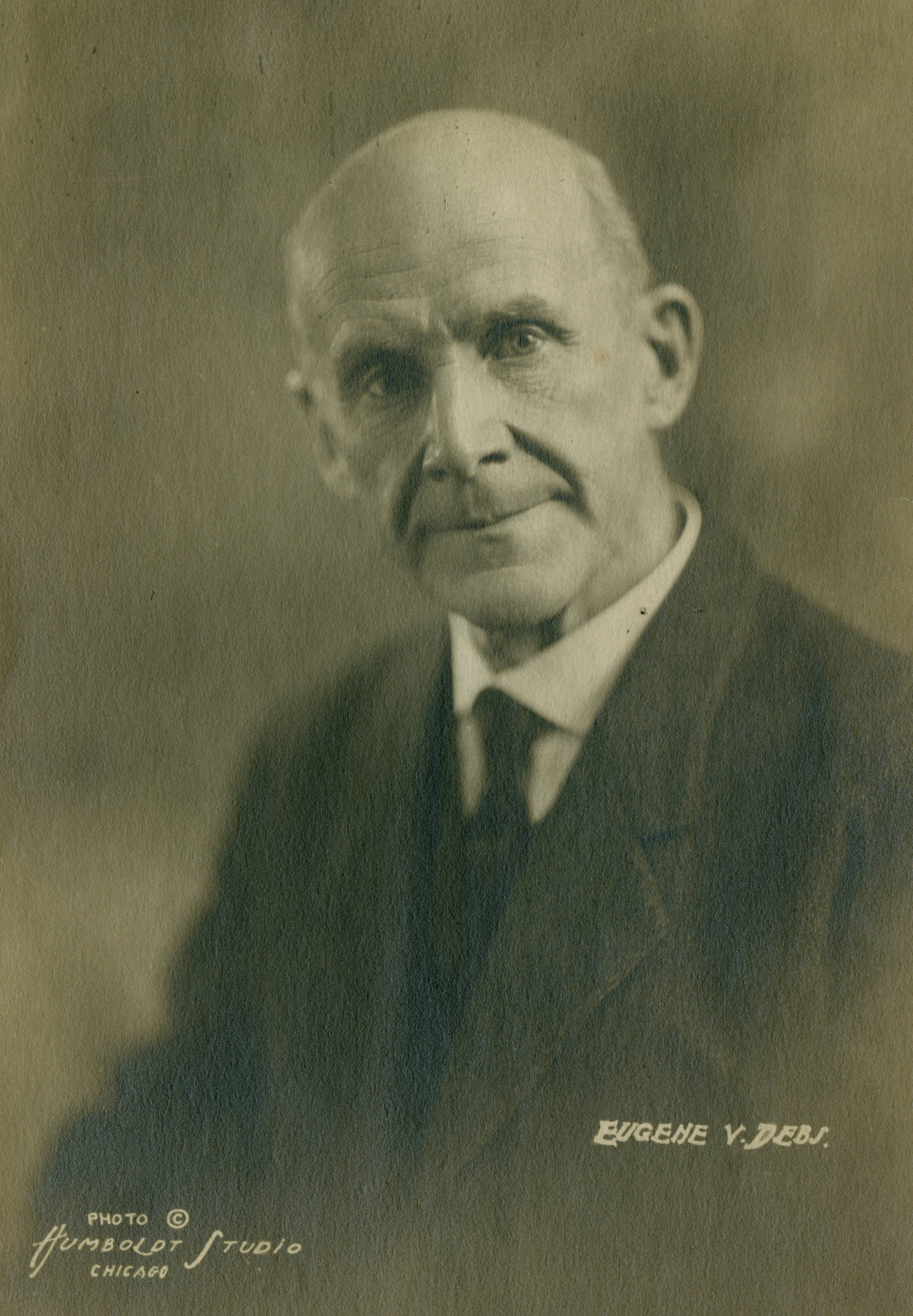
1904, 1908 presidential nominee Eugene Debs of Indiana

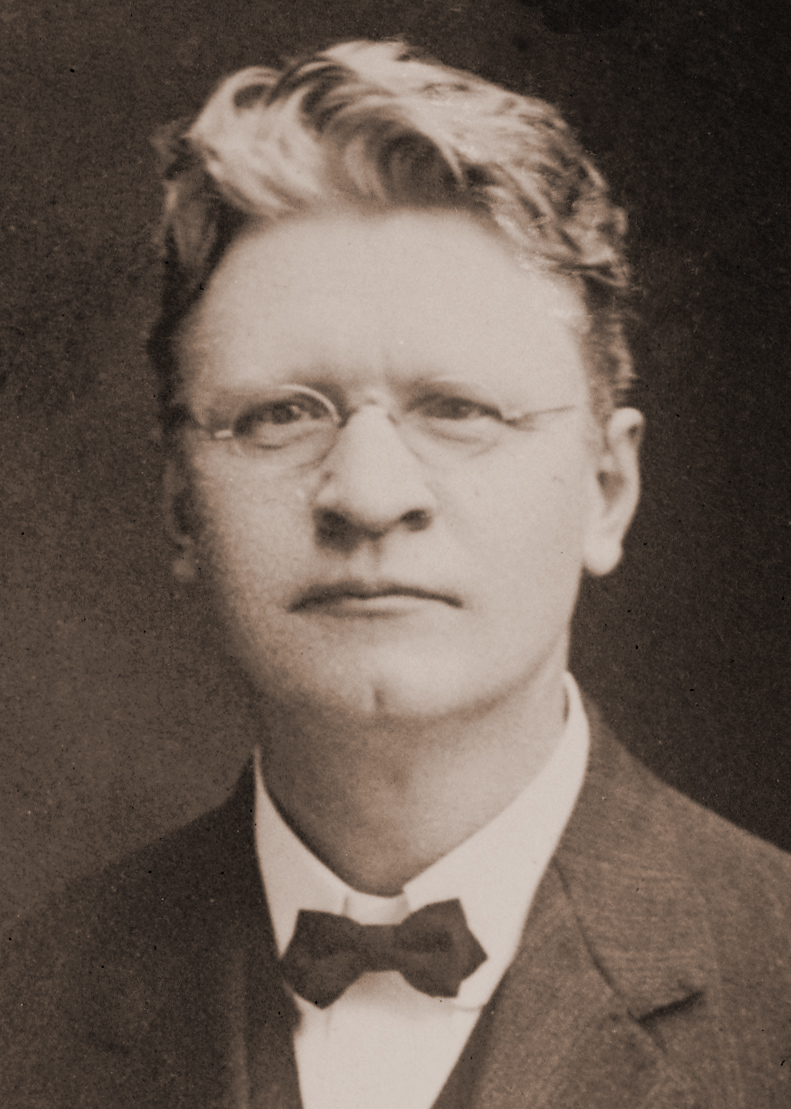
Former Mayor of Milwaukee Emil Seidel of Wisconsin

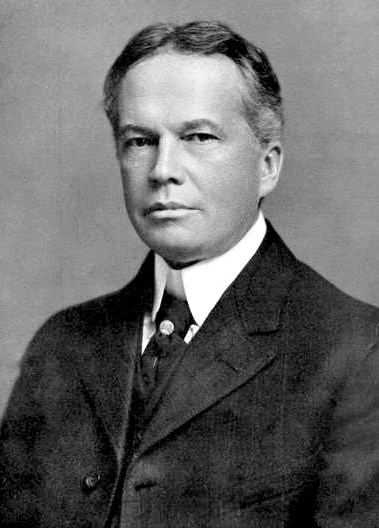
Journalist Charles Edward Russell of New York

Balloting for the party's nominee for the presidential ticket took place on May 17, 1912. The widely understood candidate was the party's previous nominee of 2 times, Eugene Debs. Debs was not present at the time of ballot casting as was tradition at the time. In his absence, questions emerged regarding his physical wellness and whether or not he would even accept the nomination. Delegates were assured that Debs was in fine health and that he would accept the nomination.

The other candidates for the nomination, Seidel and Slayton, each received around one sixth of total ballots cast. As Debs assumed a majority of ballots cast, both men released their delegates to make the nomination unanimous. Following his nomination, a dispatch was sent to notify Debs of his nomination. Debs sent a telegram the next day notifying the convention of his acceptance.

==== Presidential balloting ====
Presidential Balloting
Candidate	1st	Unanimous
Debs	165	287
Seidel	56	
Russell	54	
Blank	12	

=== Vice presidential candidates ===
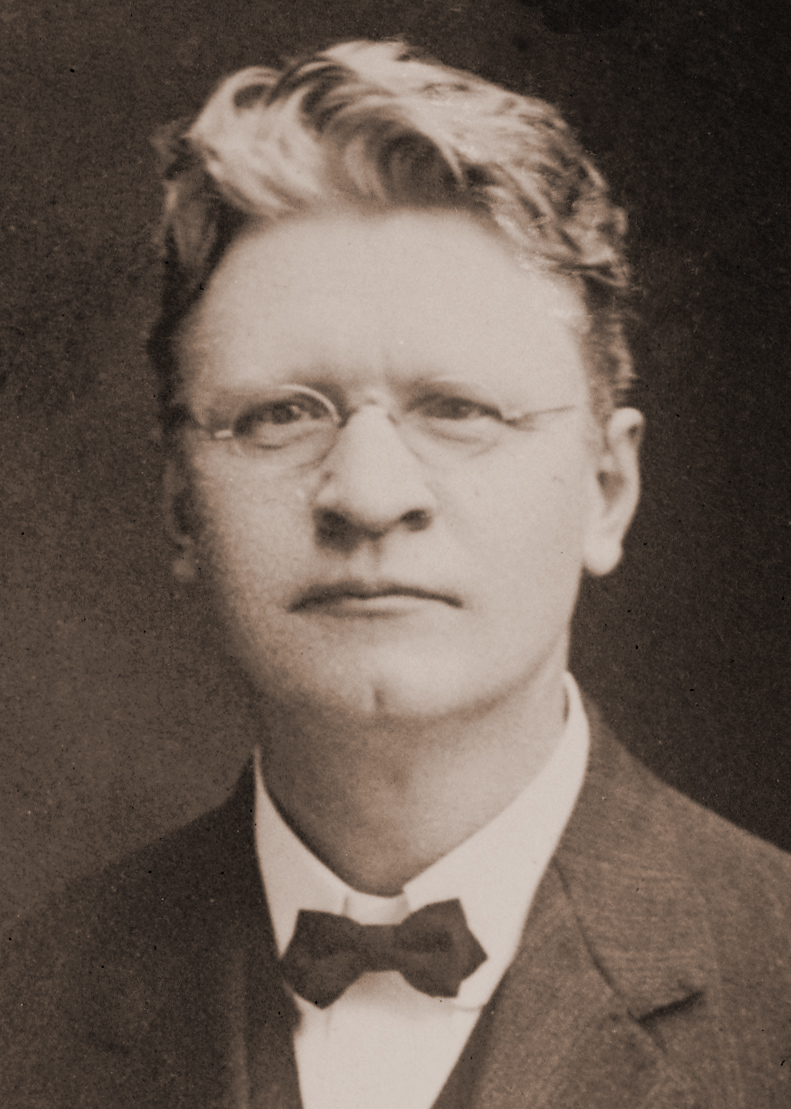
Former Mayor of Milwaukee Emil Seidel of Wisconsin

1910 nominee for governor of Arkansas Dan Hogan of Arkansas

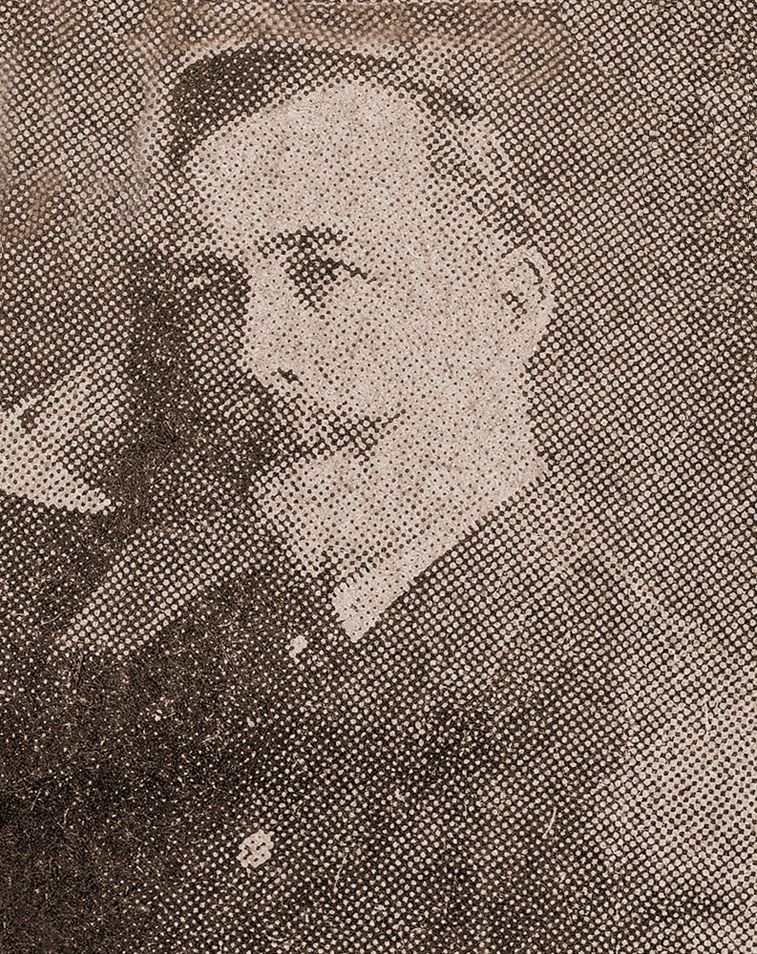
1910 nominee for governor of Pennsylvania John W. Slayton of Pennsylvania

==== Declined ====
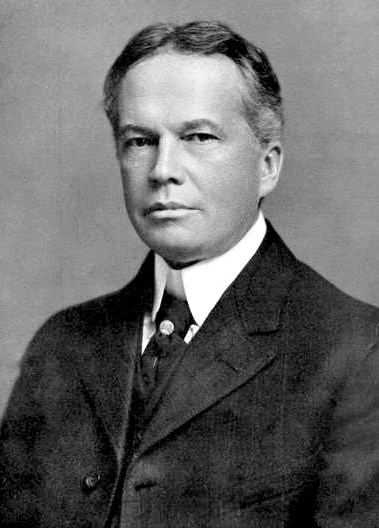
Journalist Charles Edward Russell of New York

Russell was nominated, though withdrew his name from consideration due to reasons that he preferred not to state. Both Hogan and Slayton had not planned on campaigning for the nomination thus released their delegates to make Seidel's nomination unanimous. At this point, Seidel and Debs had yet to meet. Debs and Seidel would go on to achieve the most successful performance of a socialist ticket on the national stage in United States history.

Vice presidential Balloting
Candidate	1st	Unanimous
Seidel	159	287
Hogan	73	
Slayton	24	
Blank	31	

== See also ==
- Socialist Party of America
- 1912 Democratic National Convention
- 1912 Republican National Convention
- 1912 Progressive National Convention
- 1912 United States presidential election
