= National Democratic Party (United States) =

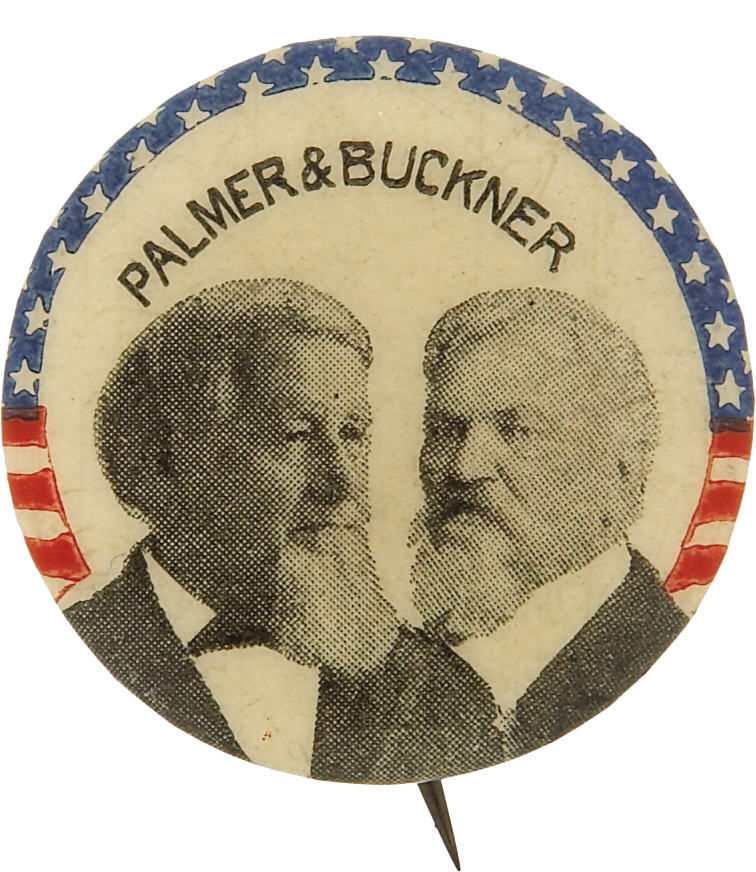
- Palmer/Buckner campaign button (1896)
- Leaders: John M. Palmer; William F. Vilas; Grover Cleveland; Simon Bolivar Buckner; Henry Kyd Douglas
- Founded: 1896; 130 years ago
- Dissolved: 1900; 126 years ago
- Split from: Democratic Party
- Preceded by: Bourbon faction of the Democratic Party
- Merged into: Democratic Party
- Ideology: Liberalism (American); Classical liberalism Anti-imperialism; Pro-gold standard
- Political position: Center-right
- National affiliation: Democratic Party
- Colors: Gold

The National Democratic Party, also known as Gold Democrats, was a short-lived political party of Bourbon Democrats who opposed the regular party nominee William Jennings Bryan in the 1896 presidential election. The party was then a "liberal" party in the context of the times, which is more of a fiscal-conservative or classical-liberal in the political context of the United States today.

Most members were admirers of Grover Cleveland as they considered Bryan a dangerous man and charged that his "free silver" proposals would devastate the economy. They nominated the Democratic politicians John M. Palmer, a former Republican governor of Illinois and Union general; and Simon Bolivar Buckner, a former governor of Kentucky and Confederate general, for president and vice president, respectively.

They also ran a few candidates for Congress and other offices, including William Campbell Preston Breckinridge in Kentucky and Edward S. Bragg in Wisconsin.

== Overview ==
The new party's founders were disenchanted Democrats who saw its organization as a means to preserve the ideals of Thomas Jefferson, Andrew Jackson, and Grover Cleveland. In its first official statement, the executive committee of the party accused the Democratic Party of forsaking this tradition by nominating Bryan. For more than a century, it declared, the Democrats had believed "in the ability of every individual, unassisted, if unfettered by law, to achieve his own happiness" and had upheld his "right and opportunity peaceably to pursue whatever course of conduct he would, provided such conduct deprived no other individual of the equal enjoyment of the same right and opportunity". They stood "for freedom of speech, freedom of conscience, freedom of trade, and freedom of contract, all of which are implied by the century-old battle-cry of the Democratic party, 'Individual Liberty.'" The party criticized both the inflationist policies of the Democrats and the protectionism of the Republicans.

Almost a "who's who" of classical liberals gave the party their support. They included President Cleveland; E. L. Godkin, the editor and publisher of The Nation; Edward Atkinson, a Boston fire insurance executive, textile manufacturer and publicist for free market causes; Spencer Trask, a New York financier and philanthropist; Horace White, the editor of the Chicago Tribune and later the New York Evening Post; and Charles Francis Adams Jr., a leading political reformer and the grandson of President John Quincy Adams. Two other supporters of Palmer and Buckner became better known in the decades after 1896: Moorfield Storey, the first president of the National Association for the Advancement of Colored People, and the journalist Oswald Garrison Villard, an anti-imperialist and civil libertarian. However, the two supporters of Palmer and Buckner who enjoyed the greatest fame in subsequent years were those bulwarks of progressivism, Louis Brandeis and Woodrow Wilson.

Most backers of the party's ideals ended up voting for Republican candidate William McKinley in the election, but the party won 137,000 votes, about 1.0% of the national total. After the election of McKinley, some Gold Democratic partisans tried to portray the election as a stunning victory for their party and confidently predicted that the defeat of the despised Bryan would open the door for Gold Democrats' recapture of the Democratic Party. In a post-election editorial, Henry Watterson claimed, "Palmer and Buckner have saved the country from shame and have saved the party from destruction."

Although the Gold Democrats captured the 1904 nomination with Alton B. Parker, Bryan and his supporters would win the long-term control of the Democratic Party. Bryan would again be nominated by the Democrats in 1900 and 1908, and modern liberals such as Woodrow Wilson and Franklin D. Roosevelt would enact many populist proposals into law. After disappointing results in the 1898 elections, the executive committee voted to disband the party in 1900. Most of its members eventually returned to the regular Democratic Party in 1900 because they opposed McKinley's imperialistic foreign policy.

== Platform ==
The platform was adopted at the convention of the National Democratic Party at Indianapolis, Indiana on September 3, 1896:

This convention was assembled to uphold the principles upon which depends the honor and welfare of the American people in order that Democrats throughout the Union may unite their patriotic efforts to avert disaster from their country and ruin from their party. The Democratic party is pledged to equal justice and exact justice in all men of every creed and condition; to the largest freedom of individual consistent with good government; to the preservation of the Federal Government in its constitutional vigor and support of the maintenance of the public faith and sound money; and it is opposed to paternalism and all class legislation.

The declarations of the Chicago Convention attack individual freedom, the right of private contract, the independence of the judiciary, and the authority of the President to enforce Federal laws. They advocate a reckless attempt to increase the price of silver by legislation to the debasement of our monetary standard, and threaten unlimited issues of paper money by Government. They abandon for Republican allies the Democratic cause of tariff reform to court the favor of protectionists to the fiscal heresy.

In view of these and other grave departures from Democratic principles, we cannot support the candidates of that convention, nor be bound by its acts. The Democratic party has survived a victory won in behalf of the doctrine and the policy proclaimed in its name at Chicago.

The conditions, however, which make possible such utterances from a national convention are a result of class legislation by the Republican party. It still proclaims, as it has for many years, the power and duty of the Government to raise and maintain prices by law; and it proposes no remedy for existing evils except oppressive and unjust taxation.

== See also ==
- Silver Republican Party
