= Tomlinson Hall =

Public meeting hall in Indianapolis, Indiana

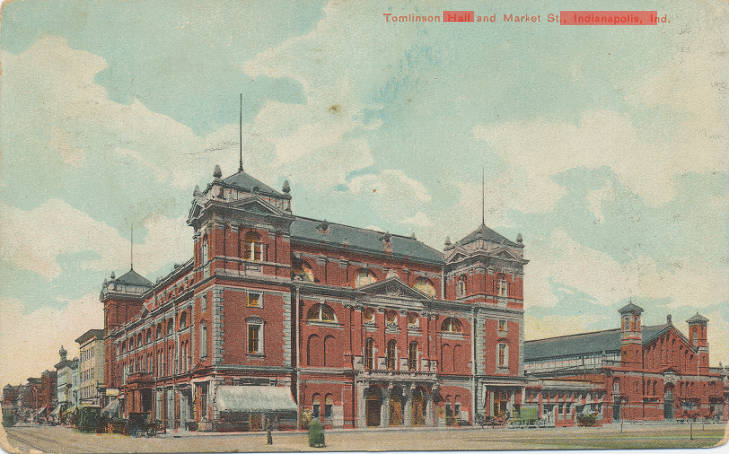
- Tomlinson Hall, with the City Market to the right, c. 1909
- Interactive map of Tomlinson Hall
- Location: Market St. at Delaware St. Indianapolis, Indiana, U.S.
- Coordinates: 39°46′07″N 86°09′14″W
- Owner: City of Indianapolis
- Capacity: 4,200 plus 650 on stage

Construction
- Built: 1883–1886
- Opened: June 2, 1886
- Closed: January 30, 1958 (fire)
- Demolished: 1958
- Cost: $125,000
- Architect: Diedrich A. Bohlen

Tomlinson Hall was a public meeting hall in Indianapolis, Indiana, on the northeast corner of Market and Delaware streets adjacent to the Indianapolis City Market. It hosted a variety of public events from 1886 until January 30, 1958, when it was destroyed in a fire.

The first floor housed businesses and overflow activity from the adjoining City Market, and the second floor contained a 4,200-seat auditorium.

The building was named for Stephen D. Tomlinson, an Indianapolis druggist, whose will had bequeathed the money to build it.

== Beginnings ==
The will of Indianapolis druggist Stephen D. Tomlinson, who had died on November 14, 1870, provided that the residue of his estate would, upon the death of his wife, Mary Todd Brown Tomlinson, be given to city of Indianapolis to construct a "public building" on the western portion of what was then East Market Square, a farmer's market that had operated since the 1830s.

The city reached an agreement with Mrs. Tomlinson in 1874 to receive the estate immediately. However, construction was delayed while the question of whether the site, which the State of Indiana had given to the city for use as a public market, could be used for other purposes. Some of the city's leaders also feared that the erection of a public hall would ultimately require a tax increase. The city council decided that the new structure would house both the public hall and the city market.

The city organized a design contest that was won by local architect Diedrich A. Bohlen. Construction using Bohlen's designs, began in 1883, and extended more than two years at a cost of $125,000. The first floor housed offices and overflow from the City Market, while the second floor contained a large auditorium with a seating capacity of 4,200 people in the audience and an additional 650 people on the stage.

== Opening and events ==
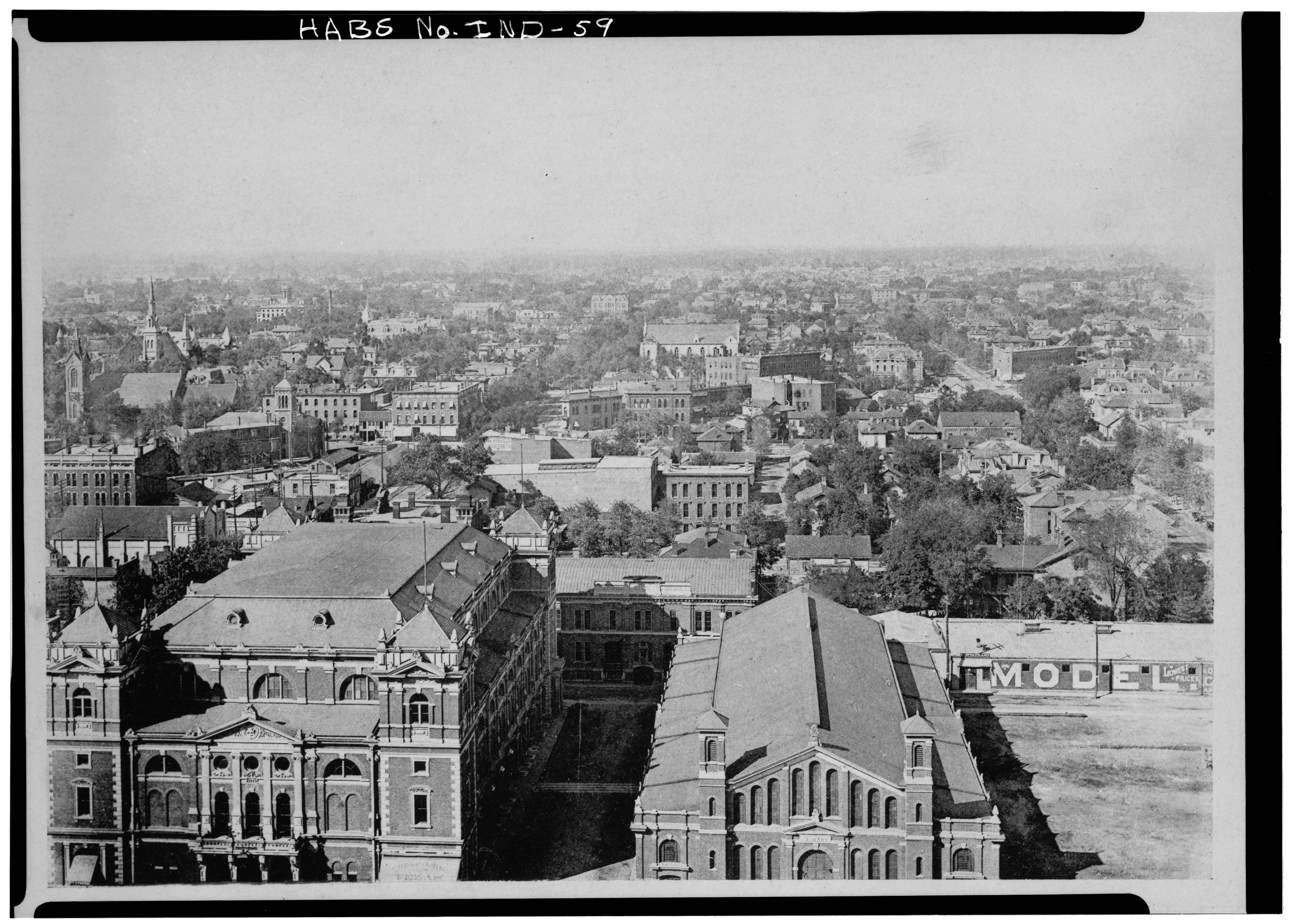
Tomlinson Hall (left) and City Market (center) in 1888

Tomlinson Hall was inaugurated on June 2, 1886, as a part of the Grand Army of the Republic Music Festival that raised money for the construction of the Soldiers' and Sailors' Monument. William Tecumseh Sherman was one of the dignitaries presiding over that event. The success of the opening concert led to the decision to found the Indianapolis May Festival; an annual classical music festival held at the hall from 1889 through 1898.

On June 27, 1888, the hall was the site of a large celebration honoring the nomination of Benjamin Harrison for president of the United States. Rallies were held in 1917 to mark the declaration of war on Germany in World War I and in 1920 to mark the city's centennial.

The hall was host to several kinds of public activities during its history, including concerts, fund raisers, political events, conventions, and sporting events. Notable entertainers who performed there included John Philip Sousa and his band (which featured soprano Estelle Liebling), pianist Ignacy Jan Paderewski, silent movie star Rudolph Valentino, and many prominent big bands of the 1920s. The hall was also host to the city's annual May Music Festival. During the Great Depression of the 1930s, dance marathons were held in the hall.

Political conventions held at the venue included several presidential conventions for third parties. This included the 1912 Convention of the Socialist Party of America; the 1896 National Democratic National Convention; and the conventions of the Prohibition Party in 1888, 1904, and 1943.

== Deterioration and fire ==
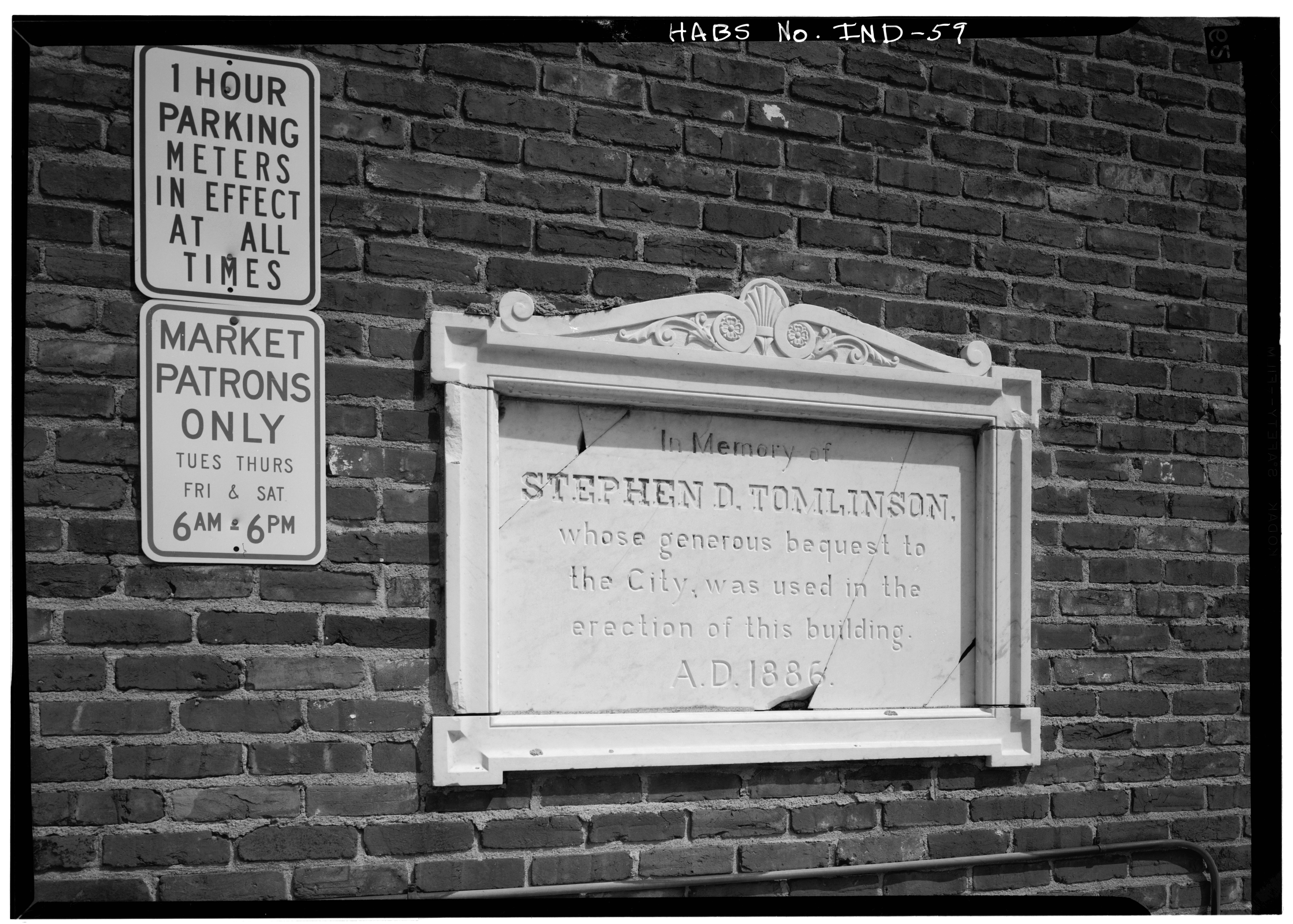
Original dedicatory plaque for Tomlinson Hall that was relocated after the 1958 fire

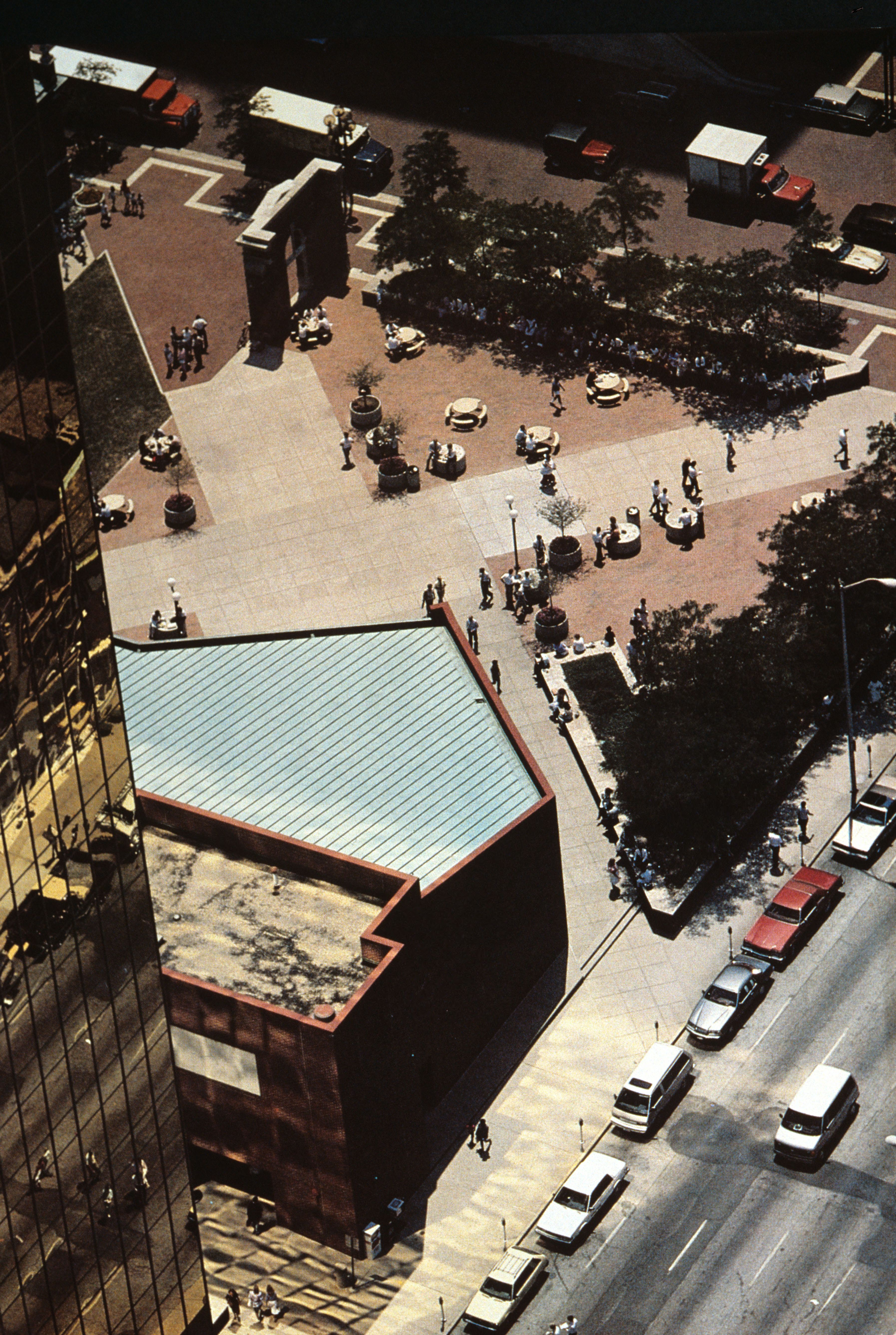
Aerial perspective of Charles L. Whistler Memorial Plaza; Market Square Center's reflective gold facade is visible at left (ca. 1990).

Beginning in the 1930s, Tomlinson Hall began to deteriorate, leading city leaders in the 1950s to consider what should be done with it. A persistent proposal was to demolish it and build a parking garage on the site. In 1955, the National Board of Fire Underwriters called the structure the "city's worst fire hazard".

The hall was destroyed by fire on January 30, 1958, allegedly after a pigeon dropped a lit cigarette on the roof of the building. The city issued a contract to demolish the building, but a group of citizens who wanted to maintain the civic landmark obtained a restraining order on March 10. The judge subsequently vacated the order on May 13, finding that because Tomlinson Hall was not part of the original market trust, the city was within its rights to raze it. The demolition was completed in July.

The demolition dealt only with the aboveground portions of the structure. The basement had been used to transport and store goods in a cooler location for the market vendors on the first floor. Subsequent construction of a new west wing of the City Market in the 1970s retained the basement. Since then the 20,000-square-foot (1,900 m^{2}) underground area, while no longer used for any purpose, has become known as the Indianapolis Catacombs, with guided tours given at various times.

When the adjacent City Market was rehabilitated in the 1970s, an arch from Tomlinson Hall that had been incorporated into a later wall was uncovered and renovated as a memorial to the hall and its benefactor. Charles L. Whistler Memorial Plaza has occupied the site since its dedication in 1987. Plans for a redesigned plaza were unveiled in January 2025, including the demolition of the City Market's west-wing addition and daylighting sections of the catacombs below.

== See also ==
- List of destroyed heritage of the United States
