= 1888 Prohibition National Convention =

American political convention

- 1888 presidential election
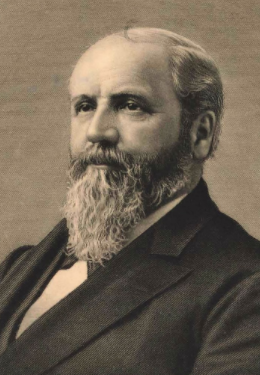
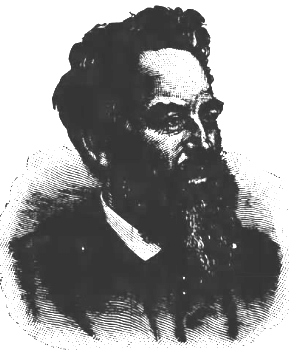
- Nominees (Fisk & Brooks)

Convention
- Dates: May 30–31, 1888
- City: Indianapolis, Indiana
- Venue: Tomlinson Hall
- Chair: John St. John of Kansas

Candidates
- Presidential nominee: Clinton B. Fisk of New Jersey
- Vice-presidential nominee: John A. Brooks of Missouri

Voting
- Total delegates: 1,029
- Results (president): acclamation
- Results (vice president): acclamation
- Ballots: 1

The 1888 Prohibition National Convention was held at Tomlinson Hall in Indianapolis, Indiana May 30–31. It nominated Clinton B. Fisk for vice president John A. Brooks for vice president.

== Logistics ==
From May 30–31, 1888, the fifth national convention of the Prohibition Party assembled in Tomlinson Hall in Indianapolis, Indiana. There were 1,029 delegates from every state but three. There approximately as many alternates. When the convention was called to order, it had more than 3,000 in attendance, including approximately 2,000 delegates and alternates. It was estimated that, beyond the delegates, an additional 4,000 party members attended the convention.

The convention was held as the party was growing in support. Its vote had jumped massively between the 1880 and 1884 presidential elections, and the party held expectations heading into the 1888 presidential election of receiving as many as 500,000 votes.

=== Convention hall preparations ===
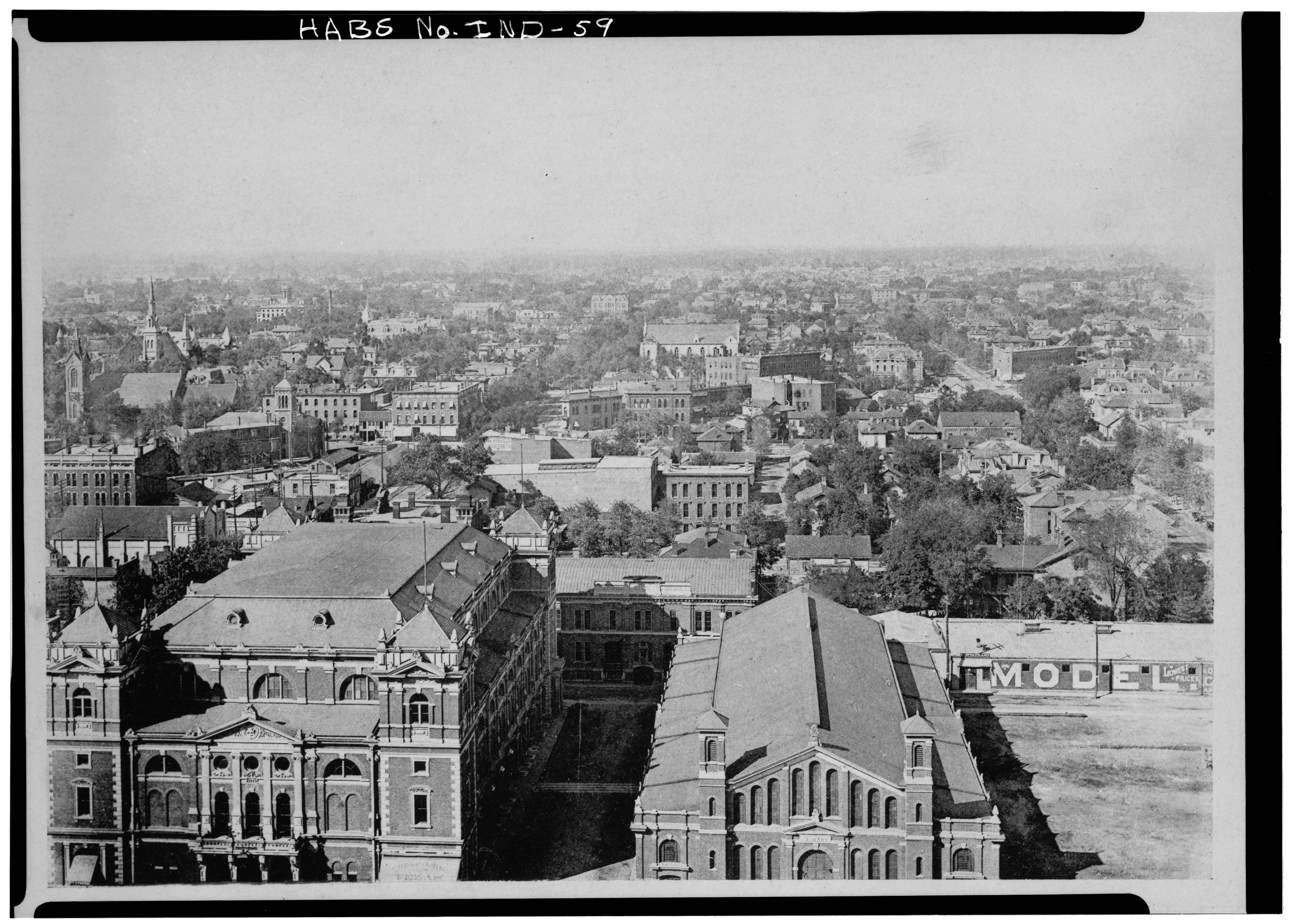
1888 photograph of Tomlinson Hall (left), the venue of the convention

The convention hall was adorned with interior and exterior decorations during the convention. The rear of the stage and the arches above it were adorned with white flags. A large banner was placed at the front of the stage reading "No North, No South. No distinction in politics, no sex in citizenship".

The galleries and interior walls of the venue were adorned with the national colors of the flag of the United States (red, white, and blue). Hanging on interior walls were also party mottos such as "The Prohibition party is the true anti-poverty party"; "National Prohibition by a party whose supremacy depends on enforcement will win"; "High license makes the liquor seller a collector of revenue"; "Poor women and children starve and freeze that the rich may evade taxation. Oh, the infamy of it!"; "Non-partisan prohibition is non-enforced prohibition. That kind the people now repudiate"; "No license for revenue only, no protection no free trade for liquor traffic"; "Local option is too local and too optional". Many in the audience held placards reading "The Prohibition army is coming 500,000 strong to conquer rum".

== Proceedings ==
In the two days prior to the opening of the convention, preliminary meetings were held in Indianapolis.

In attendance at the convention were leading national figures of the party, including George W. Bain, Neal Dow, John St. John (former Kansas governor), Sam Small, and Clinton B. Fisk.

A fundraising effort for the campaign at the convention raised $25,000 in contributions and pledges.

The convention selected the members of the party's national committee.

The chairman pro tempore of the convention was H. A. Delano of Connecticut, while the chairman of the convention was John St. John of Kansas.

=== Platform ===
A matter of great debate during the convention was whether to endorse women's suffrage in the party's platform, which the convention ultimately voting to endorse it. The only division between the majority and minority reports of the platform committee was that the majority report favored the inclusion of such a plank, while the minority report opposed it. While debate on the platform was limited to speeches of only five minutes, it lasted a long duration. The convention adopted the majority's platform (with the women's suffrage plank) by a sizable margin.

The main issue of the platform remained alcohol prohibition, on which several planks were centered. Other issues in the platform included supporting the immediate abolition of the Internal Revenue System; the abolition of polygamy and creation of uniform laws for marriage and divorce; an anti-price control plank calling for prohibition of "all combinations of capital to control and to increase the cost of products for popular consumption"; a plank supporting civil service reform. The platform included language for special recognition of Sundays as a weekend calling for "preservation and defense of the Sabbath as a civil institution without oppressing who religiously observe the same on any other day than the first day of the week". It also included language advocating for arbitration as a preferred method for settling disputes rather than court litigation, and endorsing collective bargaining between labor organizations (trade unions) and employers. The platform also included language opposing non-citizen suffrage.

=== Resolutions ===
The convention adopted a resolution commemorating Rev. George Haddock, who had been murdered in Sioux City, Iowa. The convention also adopted a resolution endorsing a plan by Mallalieu University (in Boatly, Nebraska) to build a "Haddock Memorial Hall".

=== Oratory competitions ===
The party sponsored several competitions in Indianapolis coinciding with its convention. An interstate collegiate oratory competition was held inside Tomilson Hall on June 5. That same evening, a "National Oratorical Contest" was held at Robert Park Church, with all speeches being on the subject of alcohol prohibition and the prize being a gold medal sponsored by Demorest's Illustrated Monthly.

=== Nominations ===
Clinton B. Fisk was nominated for president unanimously by acclamation. John A. Brooks was nominated for vice-president, also unanimously by acclamation.
