= Indianapolis Catacombs =

Underground passages in Indianapolis, Indiana, US

Coordinates: 39.7687°N 86.1540°W

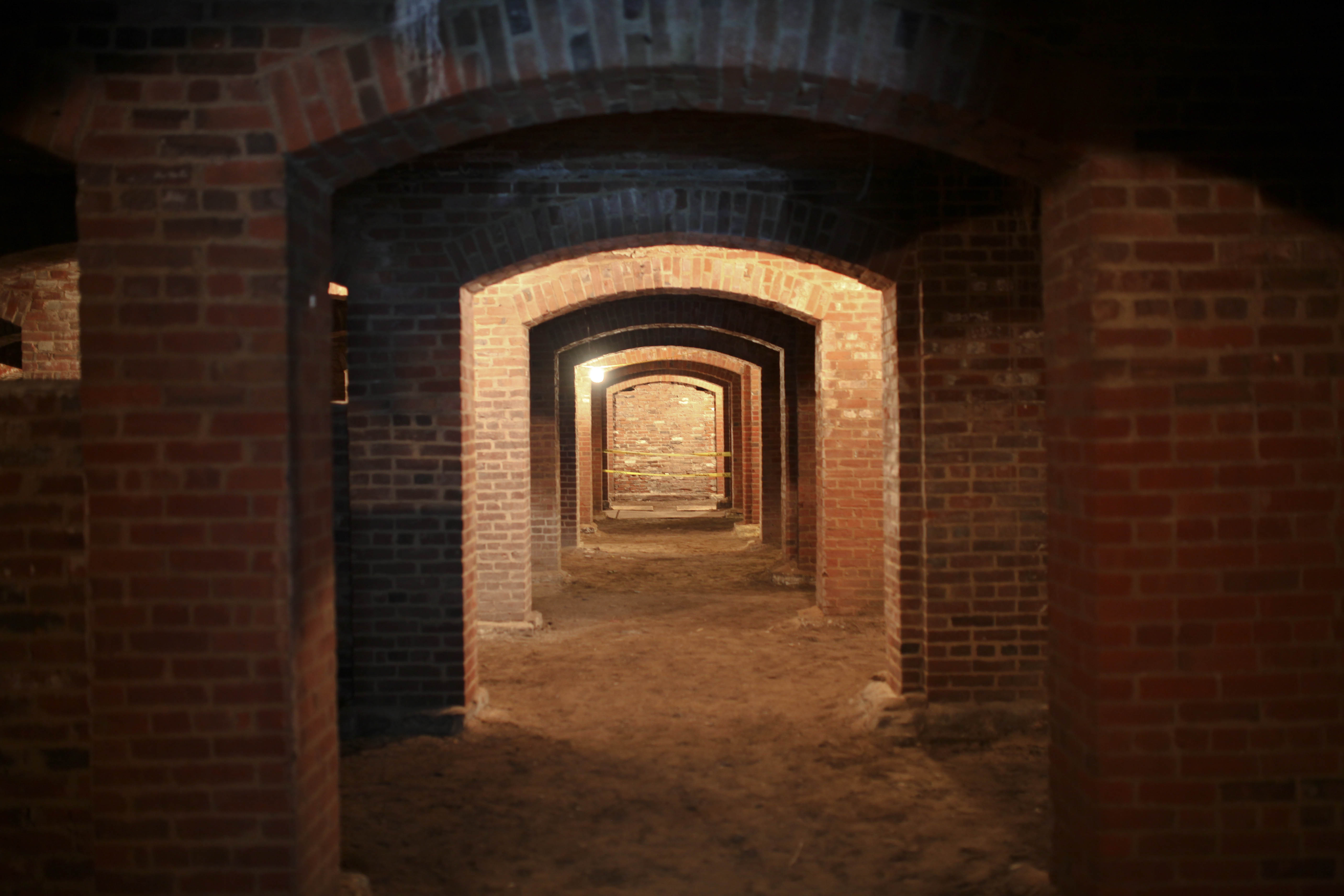
Passageway in Indianapolis Catacombs

The Indianapolis Catacombs are approximately 20,000 square feet (1,900 m^{2}) of underground passageways on the northeast corner of Market and Delaware streets in downtown Indianapolis, Indiana.

The passages and walkways include brick archways and limestone columns that were part of Tomlinson Hall, a building that opened in 1886 and was destroyed by fire in 1958. Tomlinson Hall was a public auditorium located immediately west of the Indianapolis City Market. The catacombs served as a more convenient way to transport and store goods from the above-ground marketplace and contains pits used to store ice. Indiana Landmarks offers 30-minute tours on various Saturdays during the year.
