= Indianapolis City Market =

Historic public market in Indiana, United States

- City Market
- U.S. National Register of Historic Places
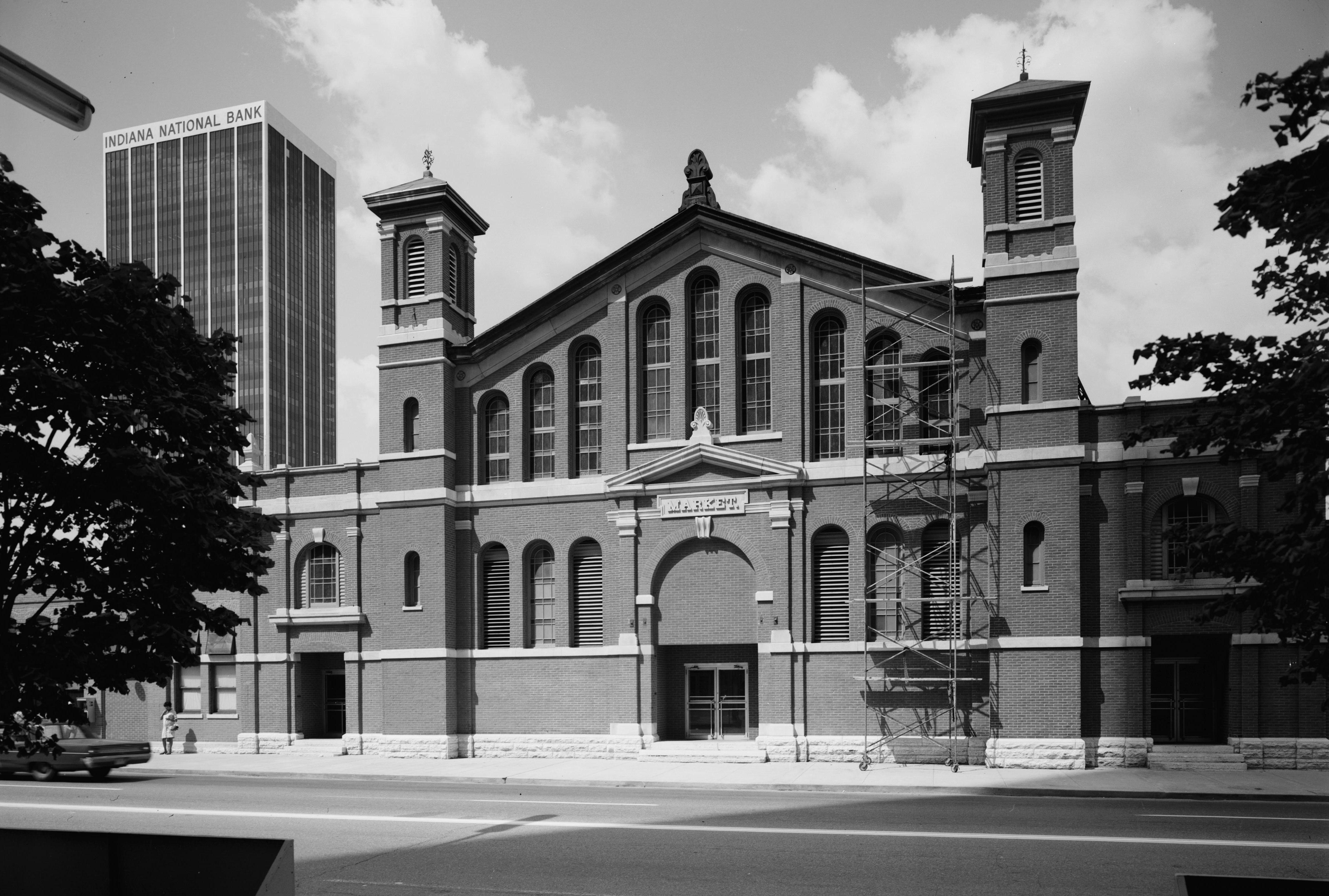
- Indianapolis City Market in 1970

- Location within Indianapolis Location within Indianapolis Location within Indiana Location within the United States
- Location: 222 E. Market St., Indianapolis, Indiana
- Coordinates: 39°46′7″N 86°9′12″W
- Area: 0.5 acres (0.20 ha)
- Built: 1886
- Architect: D. A. Bohlen & Son
- NRHP reference No.: 74000030
- Added to NRHP: March 27, 1974

The Indianapolis City Market is a historic public market located in Indianapolis, Indiana. It was founded in 1821 and officially opened in its current facility in 1886. The market building is a one-story, rectangular brick building trimmed in limestone. It has a front gable center section flanked by square towers. While it was originally a farmers market, it is now a food hall. The site was listed on the National Register of Historic Places in 1974.

== History ==
The current marketplace was originally two separate buildings called the Market House and Tomlinson Hall. The basement became known as the Indianapolis Catacombs after a vendor tried to unsuccessfully convert it into a shopping mall. The marketplace was the first place to sell bananas in the city, which were introduced by Italian immigrants that imported the product. In 2021, the market received $270,000 in direct subsidies for its operations from the city.

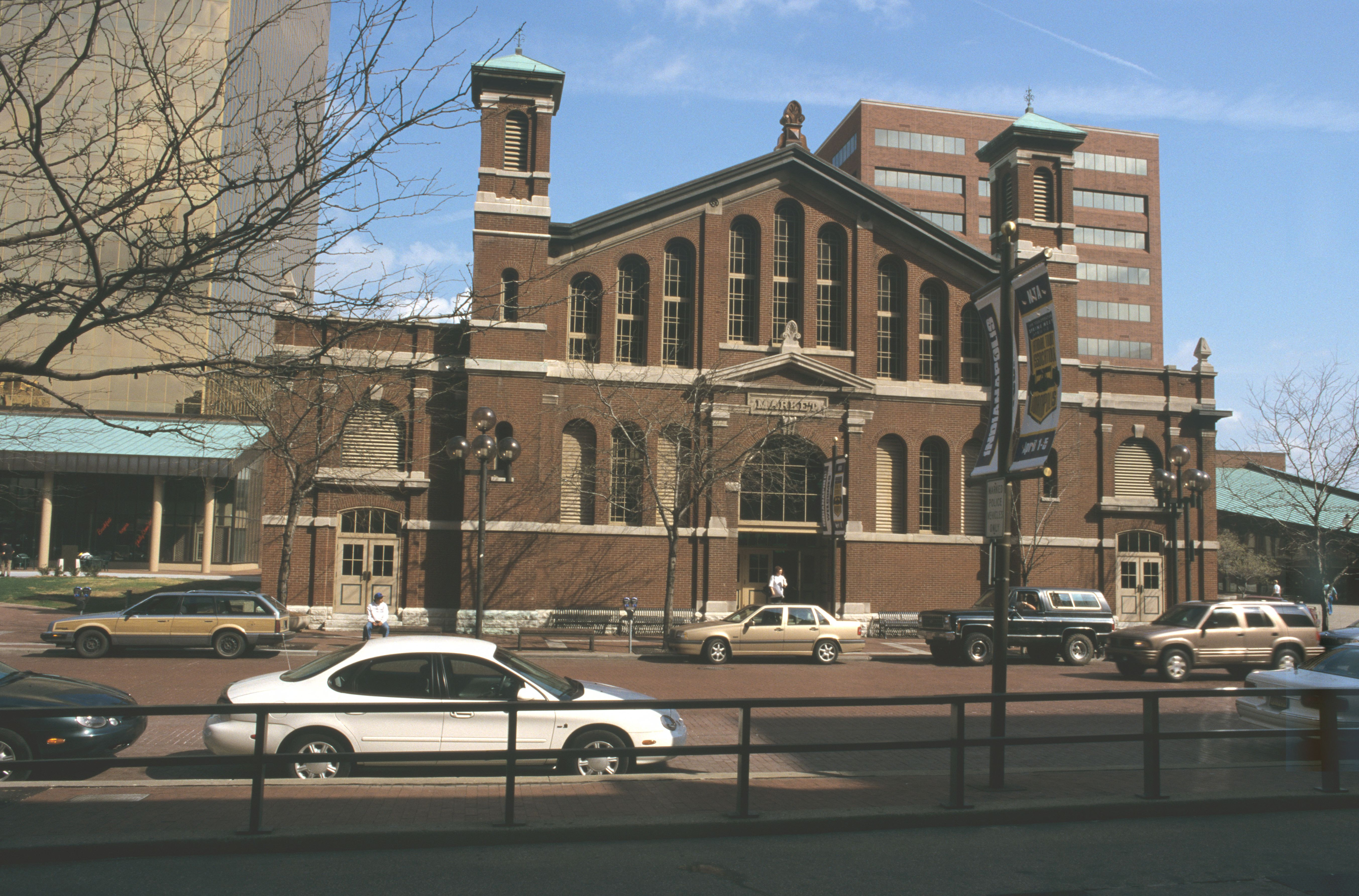
City Market photographed in 1998

== Redevelopment ==
On June 15, 2022, the city of Indianapolis announced plans to replace the east wing of the market that had been added in the 1980s with an 11-story, 60-unit apartment building that includes 8,000 square feet (740 m^{2}) of office space and 22,000 square feet (2,000 m^{2}) of retail space. The $175 million project would also include the conversion of the office building at 151 N. Delaware Street into a 350-unit multi-family housing tower and would result in the block having the highest population density in the state of Indiana.

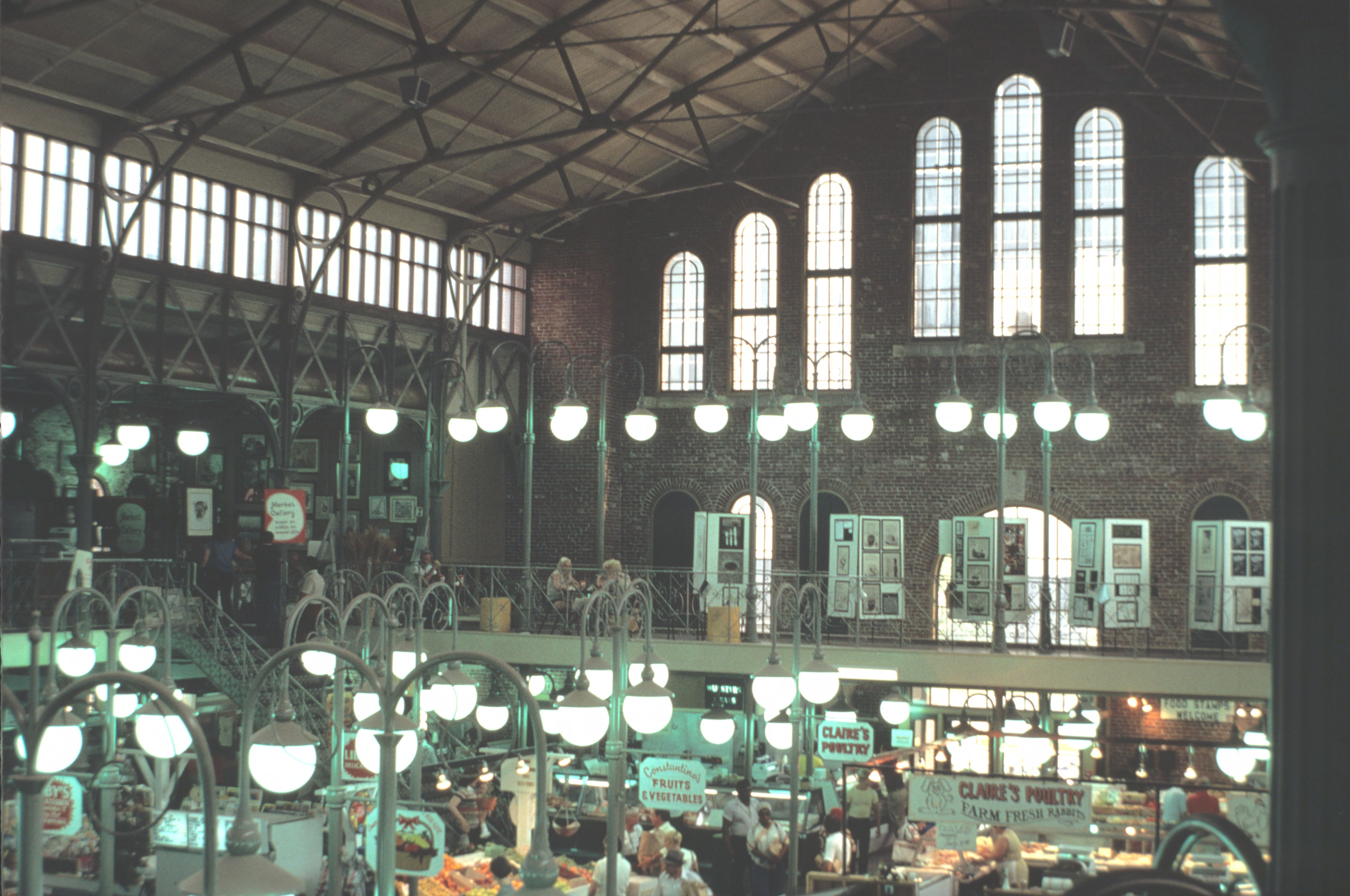
Interior of the market after the 1977 renovations

In March 2024, the market was closed to facilitate these renovations. Some tenants relocated, while others permanently closed. Tenants received two months worth of free rent before the closure.

The first phase of a $15 million redevelopment project is scheduled for completion in 2027. The new terraced design exposes the historic underground catacombs and preserves the Tomlinson Hall archway. The city of Indianapolis took over direct oversight of the development's next phases due to financing issues, delaying indefinitely the market's reopening.

== See also ==
- List of attractions and events in Indianapolis
- National Register of Historic Places listings in Center Township, Marion County, Indiana
- Super Bowl XLVI
