= 1944 Communist National Convention =

- 1944 presidential election
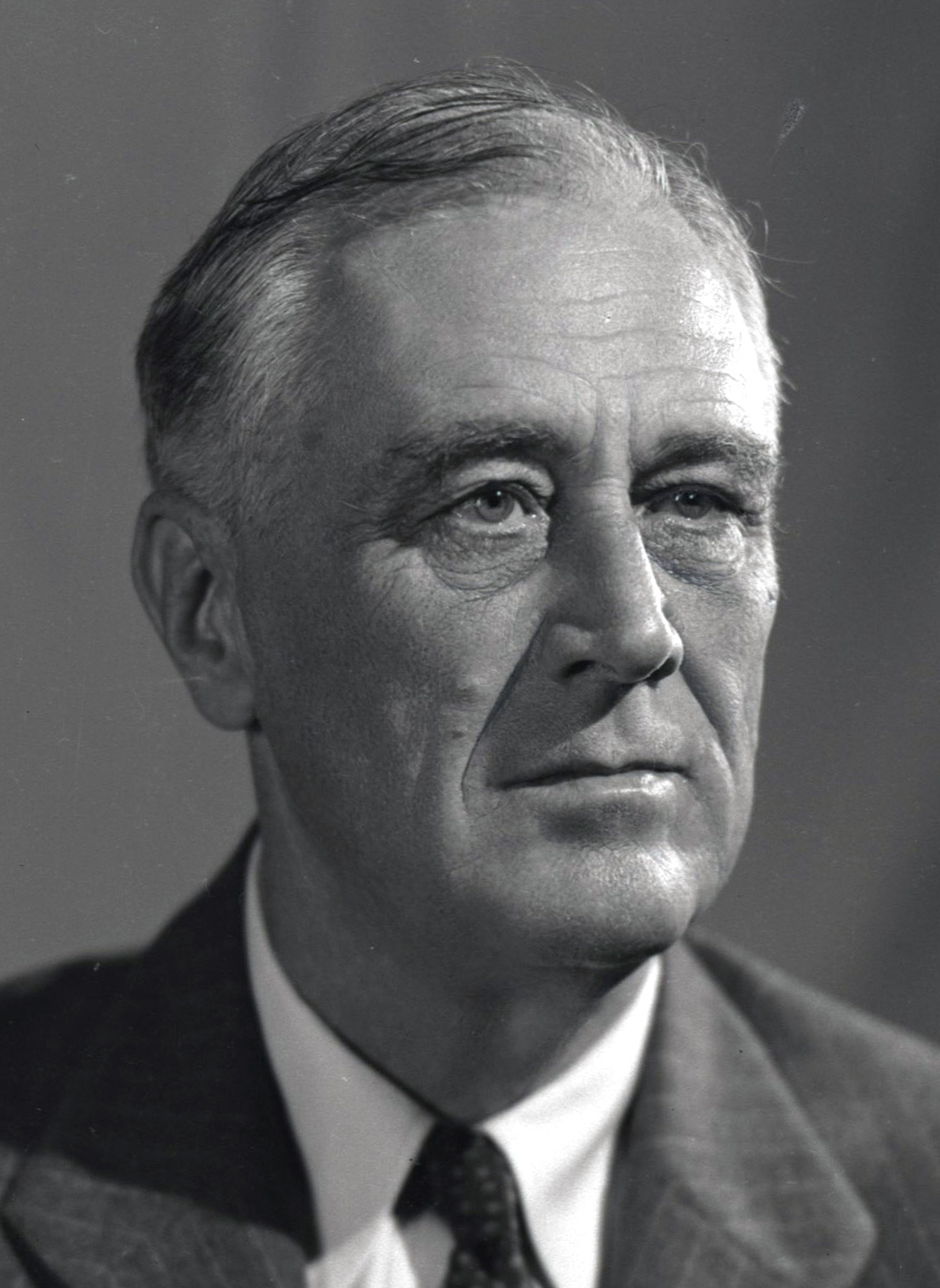
- Endorsed for president: Roosevelt (the presumptive nominee of the Democratic Party)

Convention
- Dates: May 20–22, 1944
- City: Manhattan, New York City, New York
- Venue: Riverside Plaza Hotel (working sessions); Madison Square Garden (closing rally)
- Keynote speaker: Earl Browder

Candidates
- Presidential nominee: Franklin D. Roosevelt of New York endorsed

Voting
- Total delegates: 400

The 1944 Communist National Convention was held May 20–22, 1944, in New York City. The convention endorsed the re-election of incumbent president Franklin D. Roosevelt (a Democrat) and saw Communist Party USA restructure as a non-party organization.

== Background ==
In 1944, Communist Party USA reached its peak membership of 80,000. The convention took place amid American involvement in World War II.

== Logistics ==
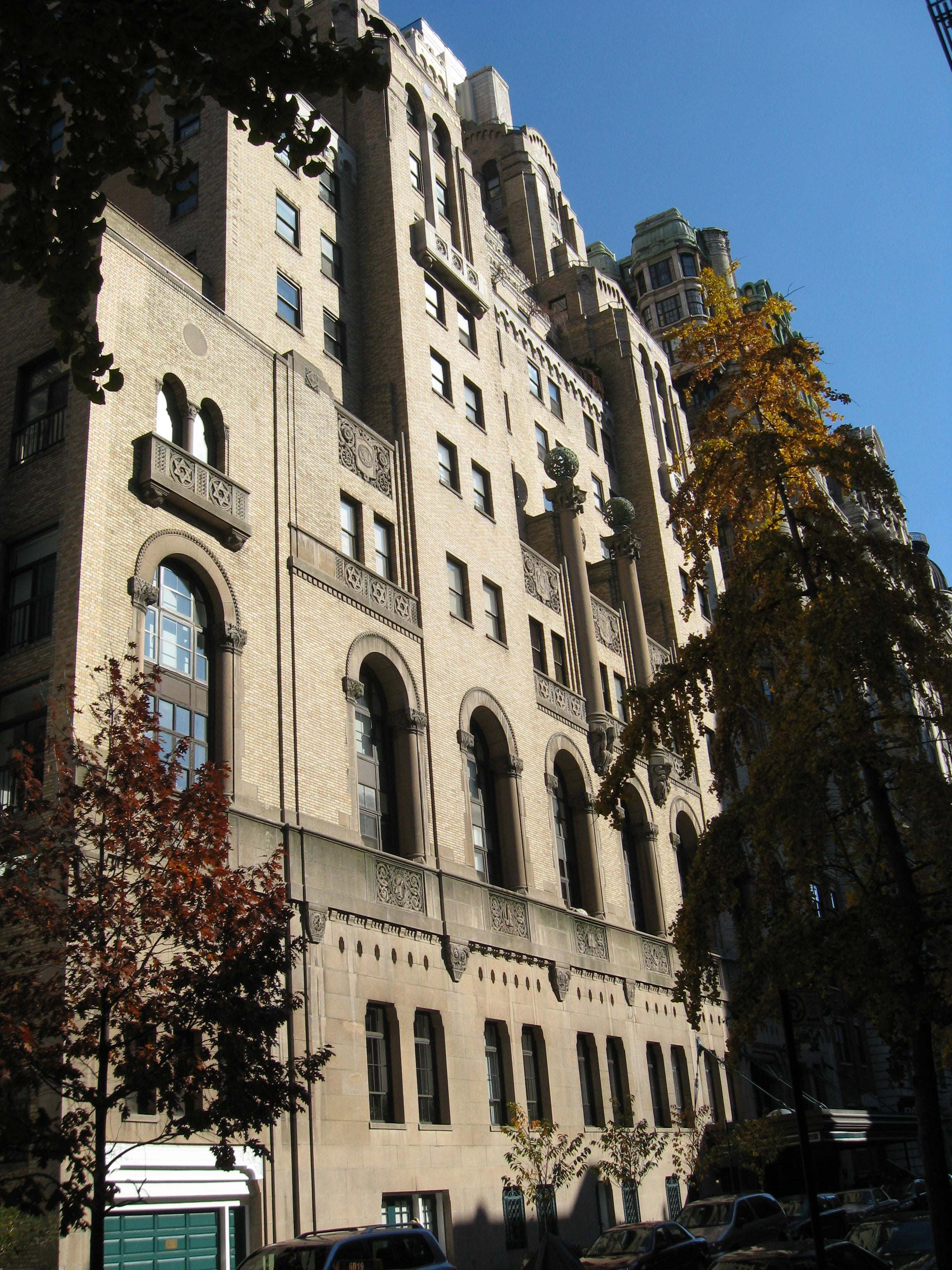
Building of the former Riverside Plaza Hotel (defunct), the venue of the working sessions

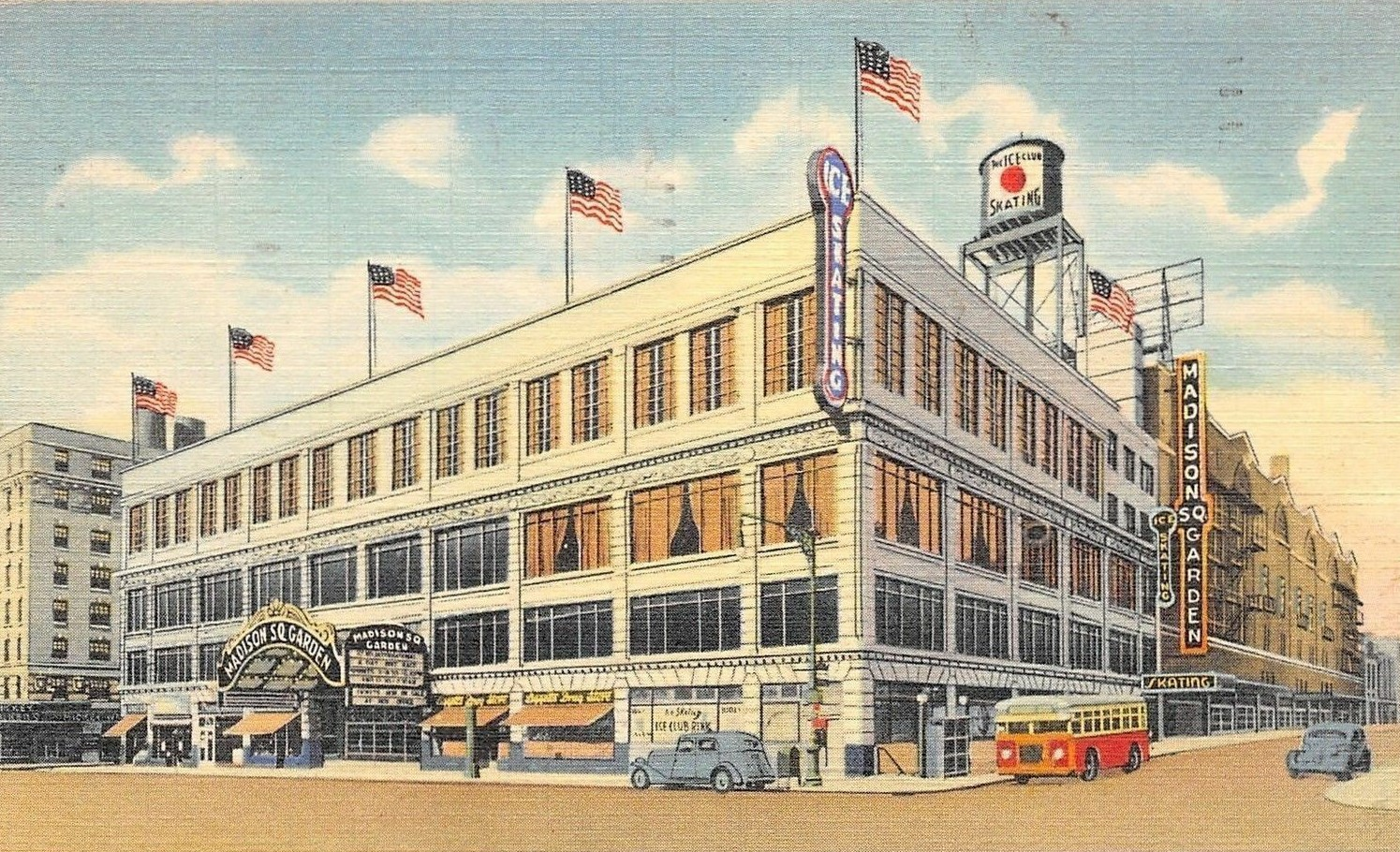
Postcard of Madison Square Garden, the venue of the closing rally

The convention was held in New York City on May 20–22, 1944 The convention featured 400 delegates.

Most sessions of the convention were held at the Riverside Plaza Hotel. Convention business was held in a ballroom that was adorned with the national flags of the United States, Great Britain, China, and the Soviet Union; as well as a large banner of a group portrait taken at the Tehran Conference of U.S. President Franklin D. Roosevelt, British Prime Minister Winston Churchill, and Soviet leader Joseph Stalin. The closing rally of the convention was held at Madison Square Garden.

The keynote address was delivered by the party's general secretary, Earl Browder.

== Nomination of Roosevelt and party restructuring ==
The convention saw the party organizationally endorse incumbent president Franklin D. Roosevelt for re-election, and also disband and reassemble to form a new organization, tentatively named the "Communist Political Association". The organization would be reformed as a non-party association for political education that would support Roosevelt's re-election Party General Secretary Earl Browder (its general secretary and past nominee for president in the previous two presidential elections) introduced the formal motion to do so, which was adopted.

Browder delivered a 90-minute address to the convention in which he touted the restructuring of the party and decision to endorse Roosevelt as historic in nature, and in the best interest of national unity. He declared that the American communists were disbanding "all aims of partisan advancement for themselves".
