= 1948 Communist National Convention =

- 1948 presidential election
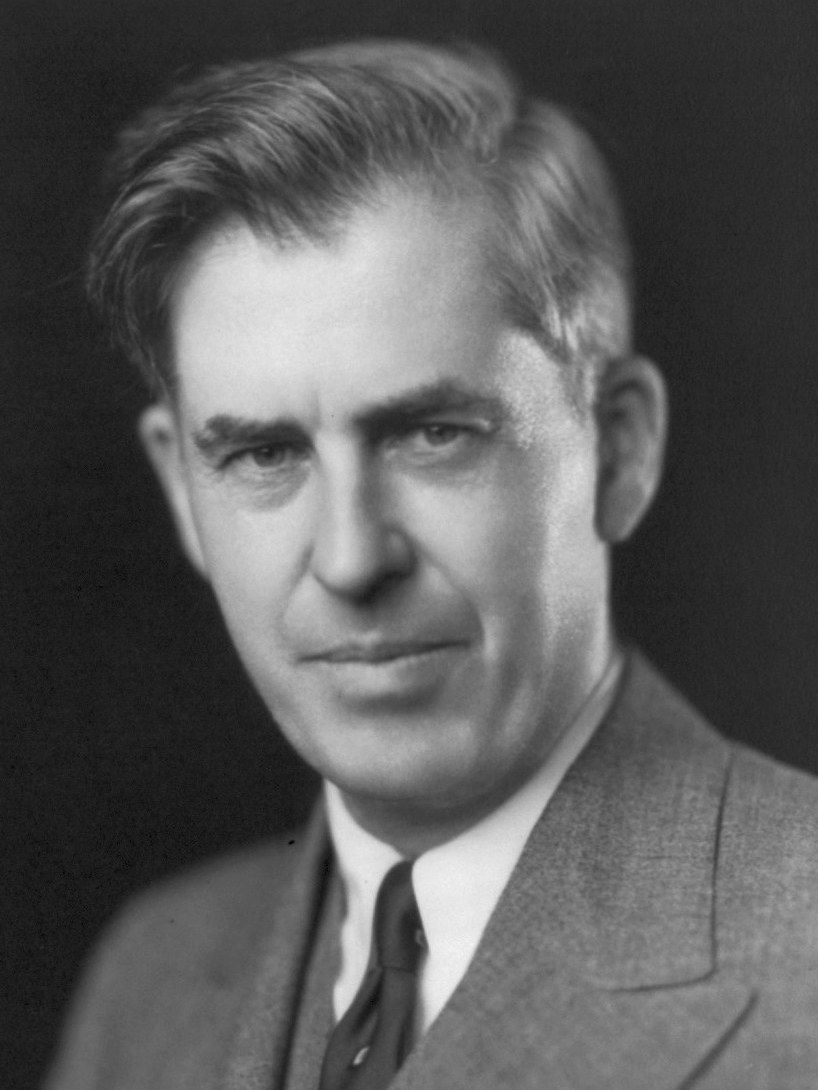
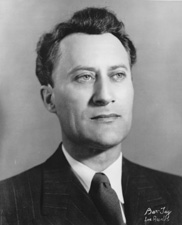
- Endorsed for president and VP: Wallace and Taylor (the nominees of the Progressive Party)

Convention
- Dates: August 3–6, 1948
- City: Manhattan, New York City, New York
- Venue: Madison Square Garden (opening rally); Riverside Plaza Hotel (general sessions)
- Keynote speaker: William Z. Foster

Candidates
- Presidential nominee: Henry A. Wallace of Iowa co-endorsed
- Vice-presidential nominee: Glen H. Taylor of Idaho co-endorsed

The 1948 Communist National Convention was held August 3–6, 1948 in New York City. On August 3, a mass rally was held at Madison Square Garden, at which it was announced that the party would be endorsing the Henry A. Wallace-led presidential ticket that had been nominated by the Progressive Party. August 3–6, the convention continued as closed-door general sessions at Riverside Plaza Hotel.

== Background ==
Communist Party USA (CPUSA) had seen its membership peaked at around 80,000 members circa 1944 under the leadership of Earl Browder, who was not a strict Stalinist and cooperated with the US government during the war. In late 1945, hardline Stalinist figure William Z. Foster took over leadership of the CPUSA, and redirected it to Soviet leader Joseph Stalin's policies. The CPUSA was not very influential in American politics, and declined further under Foster's leadership. By 1948, its membership had declined to 60,000 members. Incumbent president Harry S. Truman did not believe that the CPUSA posed a threat (dismissing it as a "non problem"), but nevertheless used the specter of communism a campaign issue when seeking re-election in 1948.

The Communist convention occurred weeks after a federal grand jury had authorized an indictment of members of CPUSA's party leadership, including Foster. This was part of the lead-up to the eventual Smith Act trials of Communist Party leaders in 1949.

== Logistics ==
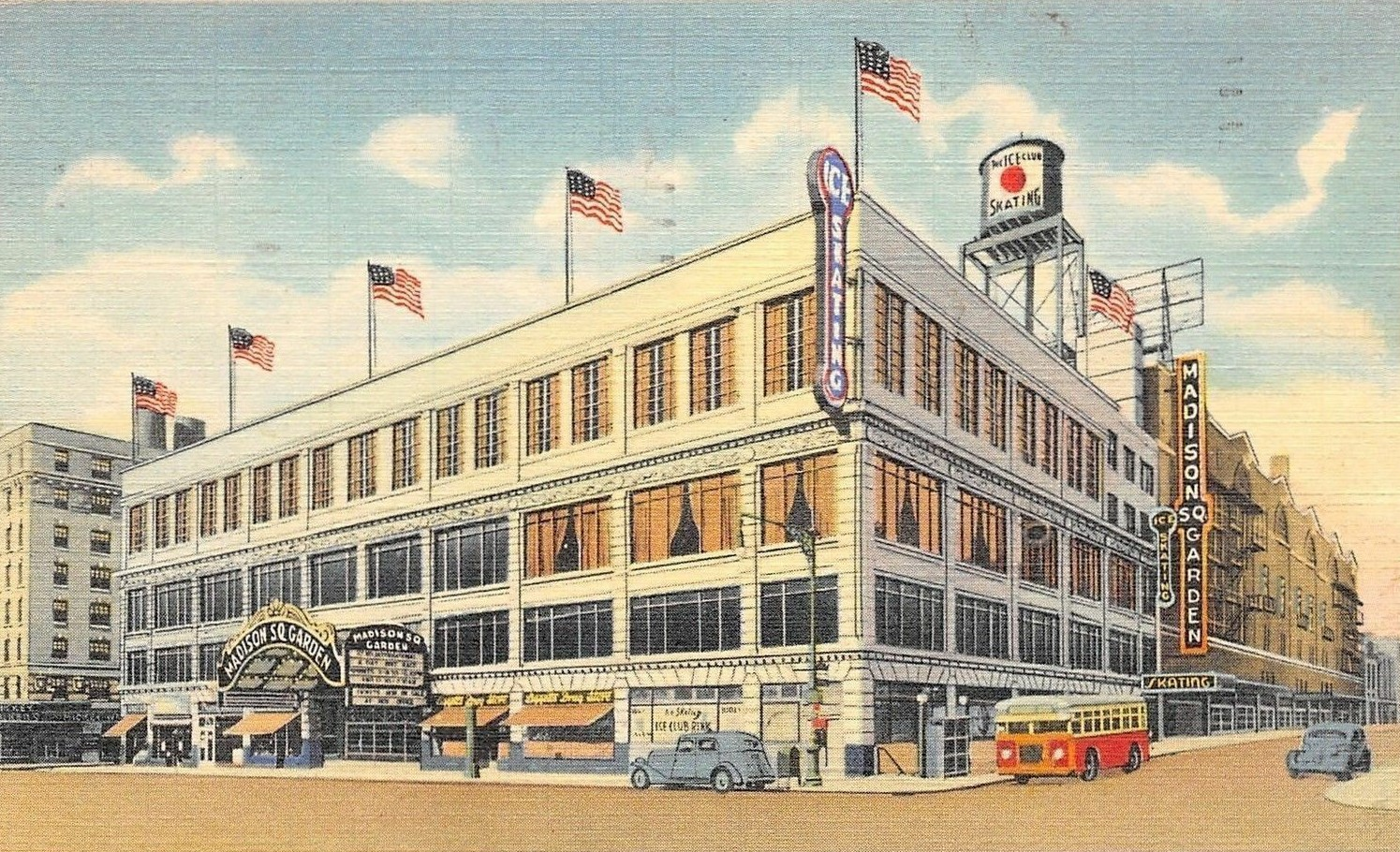
Postcard of Madison Square Garden, the venue of the opening rally

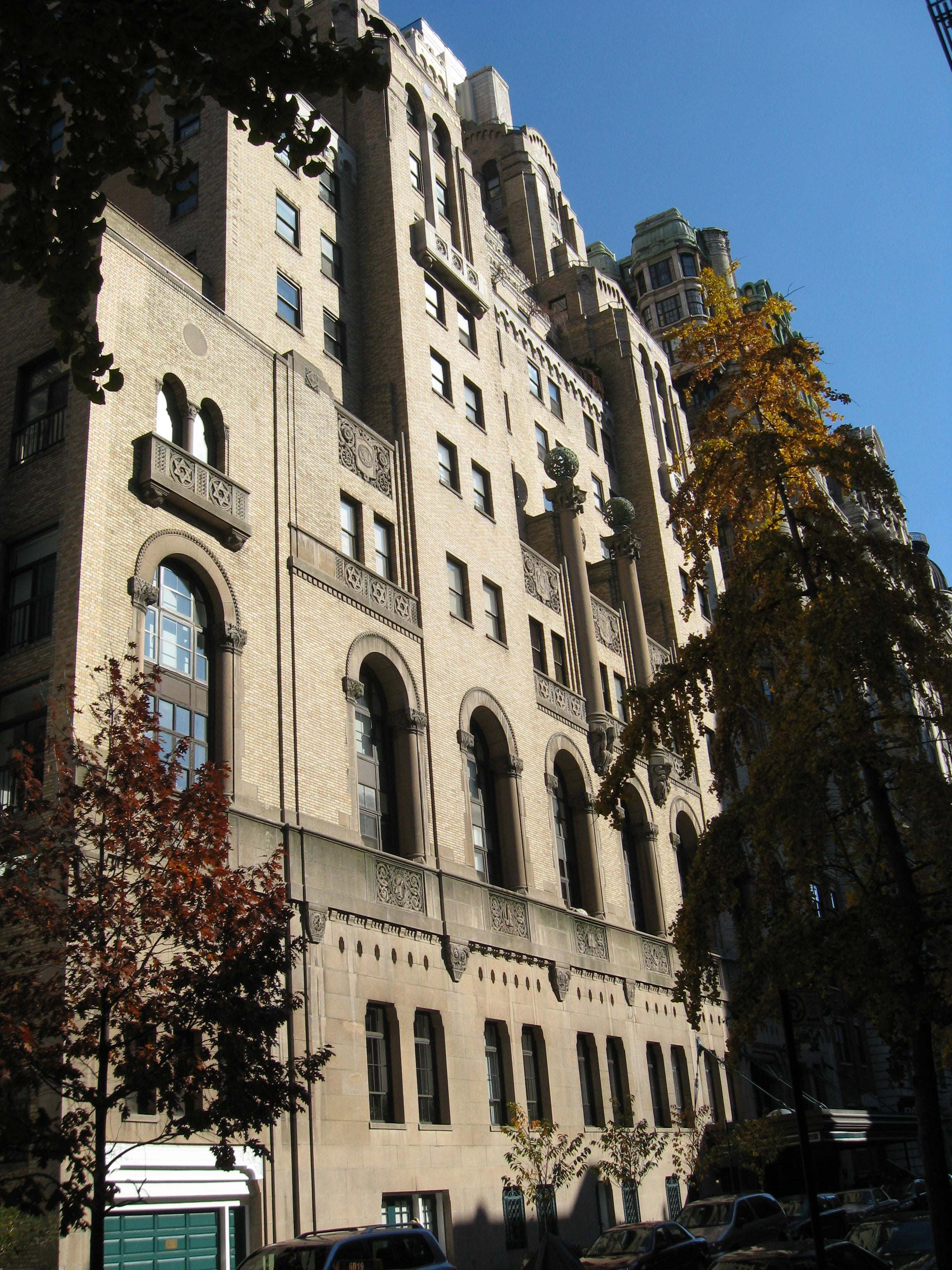
Building of the former Riverside Plaza Hotel (defunct), the venue of the closed-door working sessions

The convention was the fourteenth national party conference of the party, and the first to be held since 1945. The convention also served as a presidential convention, with the party endorsing the candidacy of Progressive Party nominee Henry A. Wallace, who had already been nominated by his own fledgling party at the Progressive National Convention. The McCarran Act was subsequently enacted in 1952, and the Communist Party went underground. Thus, 1948 marked its last presidential convention until 1968.

The opening rally of the convention (attended by between 17,000 to 20,000 party supporters) was held at Madison Square Garden on August 3. Speakers spoke from a well-lit stage, flanked by American flags; red and white colored bunting. The stage's decorations did not include displays of the hammer and sickle symbol of the Communist Party of the Soviet Union.

After the opening rally, subsequent working sessions of the convention (which were closed-door) were held at Riverside Plaza Hotel from August 3 to August 6. The closed-door working sessions were assessable only to its 250 delegates. Besides the party's own press bureau, the convention did not admit access to news media. The party claimed this was to protect its attending members from losing their employment due to their involvement with the party being publicized by reporters. Instead, the party distributed its own detailed updates of convention business to the press wishing to report on the event.

== Endorsement of Wallace and Taylor ==
The convention saw the party deliver an endorsement of the ticket of Henry A. Wallace for president. and Glen H. Taylor for vice president Party Chairman Foster announced the endorsement at the convention's opening rally. Wallace and Taylor were the nominees of the newly-founded Progressive Party. Communist Party USA had played a loud role in lobbying Wallace to run.

== Rally at Madison Square Garden ==
The convention opened with a rally at Madison Square Garden, attended by between 17,000 and 20,000 supporters.

William Z. Foster (party chairman) served as the keynote speaker, and also announced that the party would endorse Wallace for president. Foster castigated the major party nominees. He stated that the Progressive ticket was not itself a communist ticket, but was nevertheless in agreement with the party on key issues. Foster opined that the Progressive Party, "offers the opportunity for the forces fighting for peace against inflation and fascism to organize and express their strength".

Foster was joined on the rally stage by many other members of the party politburo, who (along with Foster) had all been indicted by the federal government weeks earlier. Many other members of the Politburo spoke.

== Working sessions ==
Writer Rob F. Hall, who attended as a delegate, described the convention and its working session as "essentially a working convention", describing it as being policy-focused in its business.

In his remarks to the working session, Eugene Dennis condemned the Marshall Plan, characterizing it as benefiting monopolists.

=== Platform ===
The convention adopted a party platform on August 6. The platform advocated for peace, increased wages, lower prices, sufficient housing, as well as equal rights for African Americans.
