= 1948 United States presidential election =

Election of Harry S. Truman

- November 2, 1948

531 members of the Electoral College 266 electoral votes needed to win
- Turnout: 52.2% (▼3.7 pp)

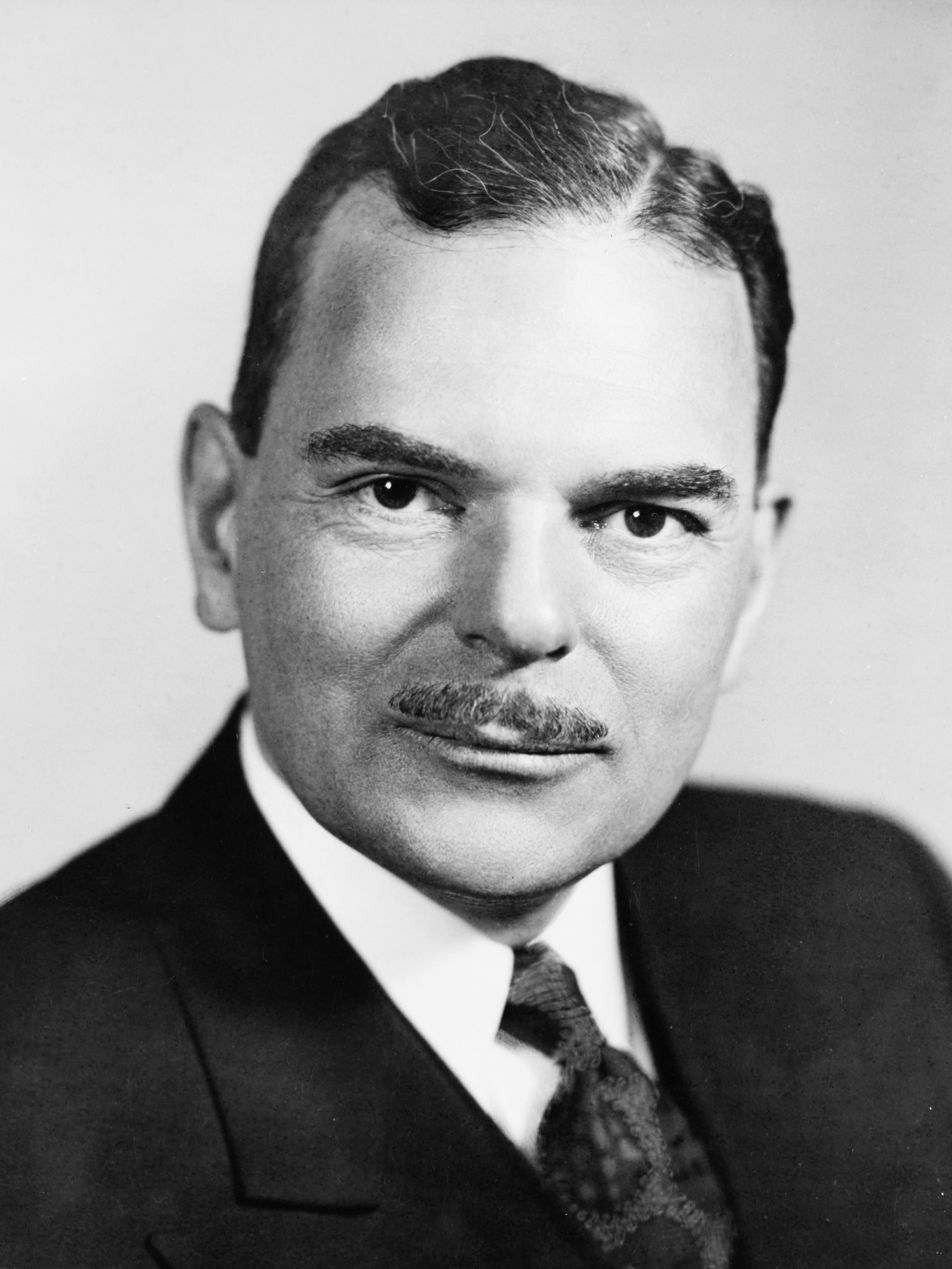

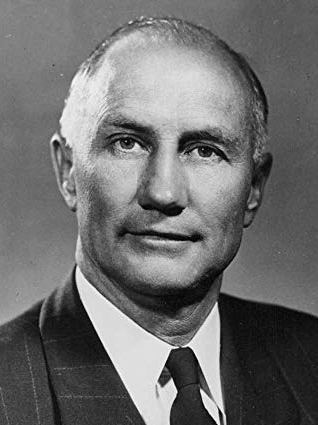
Nominee	Harry S. Truman	Thomas E. Dewey	Strom Thurmond
Party	Democratic	Republican	States' Rights Democratic (Note: More commonly known as the 'Dixiecrat Party'.)
Home state	Missouri	New York	South Carolina
Running mate	Alben W. Barkley	Earl Warren	Fielding L. Wright
Electoral vote	303 (Note: In state-by-state tallies, Truman earned 304 pledged electors, Thurmond 38. Truman lost one vote in Tennessee to Preston Parks, who voted for Thurmond & Wright, despite Truman carrying the state.)	189	39
States carried	28	16	4
Popular vote	24,178,347	21,991,292	1,176,023
Percentage	49.5%	45.1%	2.4%
- Presidential election results map. Blue denotes states won by Truman/Barkley, red denotes those won by Dewey/Warren, and orange denotes those won by Thurmond/Wright, including a Tennessee faithless elector. Numbers indicate the number of electoral votes allotted to each state.
President before election
Harry S. Truman
Democratic
Elected President
Harry S. Truman
Democratic

A presidential election was held in the United States on November 2, 1948. The Democratic ticket of incumbent President Harry S. Truman and Senator Alben Barkley defeated the Republican ticket of New York Governor Thomas E. Dewey and California Governor Earl Warren and the Dixiecrat ticket of South Carolina Governor Strom Thurmond and Mississippi Governor Fielding Wright in one of the greatest election upsets in American history.

Truman had been elected vice president in the 1944 election, and succeeded to the presidency in April 1945 upon the death of Franklin D. Roosevelt. He won his party's nomination at the 1948 Democratic National Convention only after defeating attempts to drop him from the ticket. The convention's civil rights plank caused a walkout by several Southern delegates, who launched a third-party "States' Rights Democratic Party" ticket, more commonly known as the Dixiecrats, led by South Carolina Governor Strom Thurmond. The Dixiecrats hoped to win enough electoral votes to force a contingent election in the House of Representatives, where they could extract concessions from either Dewey or Truman in exchange for their support. Former vice president Henry A. Wallace also challenged Truman by launching the Progressive Party and criticizing his confrontational Cold War policies. Dewey, the leader of his party's liberal eastern wing and the 1944 Republican presidential nominee, defeated conservative Ohio Senator Robert A. Taft and other challengers at the 1948 Republican National Convention. This was the first election to have primary and general election debates, with Dewey debating Harold Stassen in the Republican primary, while candidates from two different socialist parties, Norman Thomas and Farrell Dobbs, debated each other during the general election campaign.

Truman's feisty campaign style energized his base of traditional Democrats, consisting of most of the white South, as well as labor unions and Catholic and Jewish voters; he also fared surprisingly well with Midwestern farmers. Dewey ran a low-risk campaign and avoided directly criticizing Truman. With the three-way split in the Democratic Party and Truman's low approval ratings, Truman was widely considered the underdog, and nearly every prediction (with or without public opinion polls) favored Dewey. Defying these predictions, Truman won the election with 303 electoral votes to Dewey's 189. He won 49.6% of the popular vote to Dewey's 45.1%, while the third-party candidacies of Thurmond and Wallace each won less than 3%, with Thurmond carrying four states in the Deep South. Truman became the third of four presidents to be elected to a full term after succeeding to the presidency upon his predecessor's death. (Note: The others were Theodore Roosevelt, Calvin Coolidge, and Lyndon B. Johnson.)

Truman's surprise victory was the fifth consecutive presidential win for the Democratic Party, its longest winning streak ever. With simultaneous success in the 1948 congressional elections, the Democrats regained control of both houses of Congress, which they had lost in 1946. Thus, Truman's election confirmed the Democratic Party's status as the nation's majority party. This was the last presidential election before the ratification of the 22nd Amendment in 1951, which established presidential term limits. This did not apply to the incumbent Truman, but as he chose not to run in 1952, this was the last presidential election with no future disqualification effect for second-term winners.

== Nominations ==
=== Democratic Party nomination ===
Democratic Party (United States) 1948 Democratic Party ticket
Harry S. Truman	Alben W. Barkley
for President	for Vice President
33rd President of the United States (1945–1953)	U.S. Senator from Kentucky (1927–1949)
Campaign

Candidates in this section are sorted by date of withdrawal from the nomination race
Richard Russell	James A. Roe (Note: Candidate was not formally nominated at the convention.)	Paul V. McNutt	Benjamin T. Laney
U.S. Senator from Georgia (1933–1971)	U.S. Representative from New York (1945–1947)	U.S. Ambassador (Philippines) (1946–1947)	Governor of Arkansas (1945–1949)
Eliminated at Convention: July 14, 1948; 266 Convention votes	Eliminated at Convention: July 14, 1948; 15 Convention votes	Eliminated at Convention: July 14, 1948; 2.5 Convention votes	Withdrew: July 14, 1948
Claude Pepper	Dwight D. Eisenhower	Henry A. Wallace	
U.S. Senator from Florida (1936–1951)	CS of the U.S. Army (1945–1948)	U.S. Vice President (1941–1945)	
Withdrew: July 13, 1948	Declined draft effort: July 9, 1948	Ran third party: December 29, 1947	

On July 12, the Democratic National Convention convened in Philadelphia in the same arena where the Republicans had met a few weeks earlier. Spirits were low; the Republicans had taken control of both houses of the United States Congress and a majority of state governorships during the 1946 mid-term elections, and the public opinion polls showed Truman trailing Republican nominee Dewey, sometimes by double digits. Furthermore, some liberal Democrats had joined Henry A. Wallace's new Progressive Party, and party leaders feared that Wallace would take enough votes from Truman to give the large Northern and Midwestern states to the Republicans. Conservatives dominated the party in the South, and they were angered by the growing voice of labor unions and black voters in the party outside the South. The hope that Truman would reverse course faded when he vetoed the Taft-Hartley Law, which sought to reduce the power of labor unions. Congress voted to override Truman's veto, and the Taft-Hartley Law went into effect on June 23, 1947. Finally, Truman's appointment of a liberal civil rights commission convinced Southern conservatives that to re-establish their voice they had to threaten third-party action to defeat Truman in 1948.

Alexander F. Whitney, who was previously critical of Truman and threatened to finance a third-party campaign, praised him after Truman vetoed the Taft–Hartley Act and said the veto "vindicated him in the eyes of labor". Whitney and Brotherhood of Railroad Trainmen had been supporters of Wallace since the 1944 convention. Wallace said he wanted "to work within the Democratic party realm" in September 1947.

Truman was aware of his unpopularity. In July 1947, he privately offered to be Eisenhower's running mate on the Democratic ticket if MacArthur won the Republican nomination, an offer Eisenhower declined. This offer did not become public knowledge during the campaign. As a result of Truman's low standing in the polls, several Democratic party bosses began working to "dump" him and nominate a more popular candidate. Among the leaders of this movement were Jacob Arvey, the head of the powerful Cook County (Chicago) Democratic organization; Frank Hague, the boss of New Jersey; James Roosevelt, the eldest son of former President Franklin D. Roosevelt; and liberal Senator Claude Pepper from Florida. The rebels hoped to draft Eisenhower as the Democratic nominee. On July 10, Eisenhower officially refused to run. There was then an attempt to put forward Supreme Court Justice William O. Douglas, but Douglas also refused. Finally, Pepper declared his intention to challenge Truman for the nomination. His candidacy collapsed when the liberal Americans for Democratic Action and the Congress of Industrial Organizations withheld their support, partly due to concerns over Pepper's attacks on Truman's foreign policy decisions regarding the Soviet Union. As a result of the refusal by most of the dump-Truman delegates to support him, Pepper withdrew his candidacy for the nomination on July 16. Lacking a candidate acceptable to all sides, the leaders of the dump-Truman movement reluctantly agreed to support Truman for the nomination.

==== Democratic Convention ====
At the Democratic Convention, Truman initially proposed a civil rights plank to the party platform that moderated the strong vocal support for civil rights that he had expressed at the NAACP convention in 1947, and to Congress in February 1948. This proposal disappointed Northern and Western liberals who wanted more swift and sweeping reforms in civil rights, but it also failed to placate Southern conservatives, and both sides decided to present their own amendments and proposals to Truman's civil rights plank. Former Texas Governor Dan Moody proposed a plank that supported the status quo of states' rights; a similar but shorter proposal was made by Cecil Sims of the Tennessee delegation. On the liberal side, Wisconsin Representative Andrew Biemiller proposed a strong civil rights plank that was more explicit and direct in its language than Truman's convention proposal. Minneapolis Mayor Hubert Humphrey led the support for the Biemiller plank. In his speech to the convention, Humphrey memorably said, "the time has come for the Democratic Party to get out of the shadow of states' rights and walk forthrightly into the bright sunshine of human rights!"

Truman and his staff knew it was highly likely that any civil rights plank would lead Southern delegates to stage a walkout in protest, but Truman believed that civil rights was an important moral cause and ultimately abandoned his advisers' attempts to "soften the approach" with the moderate plank. He supported and defended the "Crackpot" Biemiller plank, which passed by 651.5 votes to 582.5. It also received strong support from many of the big-city party bosses, most of whom felt that the civil rights platform would encourage the growing black population in their cities to vote for the Democrats. The passage of the civil rights platform caused some three dozen Southern delegates, led by South Carolina Governor Strom Thurmond, to walk out of the convention. The Southern delegates who remained nominated Senator Richard Russell Jr. from Georgia as a rebuke to Truman. Nonetheless, 947 Democratic delegates voted for Truman, while Russell received only 266 votes, all from the South. Truman's first choice for his running mate was Supreme Court Justice William O. Douglas, hoping that it might make the ticket more appealing to liberals. Douglas refused the nomination. Needing an alternative, Truman then selected Senator Alben W. Barkley from Kentucky, who had delivered the convention's keynote address, as his running mate, and Barkley was nominated by acclamation.

Truman gave a fighting acceptance speech, saying, "Senator Barkley and I will win this election and make the Republicans like it—don't you forget it! ... We will do that because they are wrong and we are right." He said the Republican Party had, "ever since its inception ... been under the control of special privilege; and they have completely proved it in the Eightieth Congress." At the end of the speech, the "delegates rose to their feet and cheered loudly for two minutes ... for a moment Truman had created the illusion—few regarded it as more than an illusion—that the Democrats had a fighting chance in November."

Balloting
Presidential ballot		Vice presidential ballot	
Harry S. Truman	947.5	Alben W. Barkley	1,234
Richard Russell Jr.	266		
James A. Roe	15		
Paul V. McNutt	2		
Alben W. Barkley	1		

=== Republican Party nomination ===
Republican Party (United States) 1948 Republican Party ticket
Thomas E. Dewey	Earl Warren
for President	for Vice President
47th Governor of New York (1943–1954)	30th Governor of California (1943–1953)

Candidates in this section are sorted by date of withdrawal from the nomination race
Robert A. Taft	Harold Stassen	Arthur Vandenberg	Earl Warren
U.S. Senator from Ohio (1939–1953)	Governor of Minnesota (1939–1943)	U.S. Senator from Michigan (1928–1951)	Governor of California (1943–1953)
Eliminated at Convention: June 24, 1948; 274 Convention votes 464,741 Popular votes	Eliminated at Convention: June 24, 1948; 157 Convention votes 627,321 Popular votes	Eliminated at Convention: June 24, 1948; 62 Convention votes 18,924 Popular votes	Eliminated at Convention: June 24, 1948; 59 Convention votes 771,295 Popular votes
Raymond E. Baldwin	Joseph W. Martin (Note: Candidate was not formally nominated at the convention.)	B. Carroll Reece	Douglas MacArthur
U.S. Senator from Connecticut (1946–1949)	U.S. House Speaker from Massachusetts (1925–1967)	Chair of the RNC (1946-1948)	SC for the Allied Powers (1945–1951)
Eliminated at Convention: June 24, 1948; 19 Convention votes	Eliminated at Convention: June 24, 1948; 18 Convention votes 974 Popular votes	Eliminated at Convention: June 24, 1948; 15 Convention votes	Eliminated at Convention: June 24, 1948; 11 Convention votes 87,839 Popular votes
Dwight H. Green	Alfred E. Driscoll	Dwight D. Eisenhower	
Governor of Illinois (1941–1949)	Governor of New Jersey (1947–1954)	CS of the U.S. Army (1945–1948)	
Withdrew at Convention: June 24, 1948 B2B; 56 Convention votes	Withdrew at Convention: June 24, 1948 B2B; 35 Convention votes	Declined draft effort: January 23, 1948	

For both Republicans and Democrats, there were movements of support for General Dwight D. Eisenhower, the most popular general of World War II and a favorite in the polls. But unlike the movement within the Democratic Party, the Republican draft movement came largely from its grassroots. By January 23, 1948, the movement had entered Eisenhower's name into every state holding a Republican presidential primary, and polls gave him a significant lead against all other contenders. With the first state primary approaching, Eisenhower was forced to make a quick decision. Saying that soldiers should keep out of politics, Eisenhower declined to run and requested that the draft movement cease. After several failed efforts to get Eisenhower to reconsider, the organization disbanded, with most of its leadership endorsing former Minnesota Governor Harold Stassen.

With Eisenhower refusing to run, the contest for the Republican nomination was between Stassen, New York Governor Thomas E. Dewey, Senator Robert A. Taft from Ohio, California Governor Earl Warren, General Douglas MacArthur, and Senator Arthur H. Vandenberg from Michigan, the senior Republican in the Senate. Dewey, who had been the Republican nominee in 1944, was regarded as the frontrunner when the primaries began. Dewey was the acknowledged leader of the Republican Party's Eastern Establishment. In 1946 he had been reelected governor of New York by the largest margin in state history. Dewey's handicap was that many Republicans disliked him personally; he often came off as cold, stiff, and calculating. Taft was the leader of the Republican Party's conservative wing, which was strongest in the Midwest and parts of the South. He called for abolishing many New Deal welfare programs, which he felt were harmful to business interests, and was skeptical of American involvement in foreign alliances such as the United Nations. Taft had two major weaknesses: He was a plodding, dull campaigner, and he was viewed by most party leaders as too conservative and controversial to win a presidential election.

Both Vandenberg and Warren were highly popular in their home states, but each refused to campaign in the primaries, limiting their chances of winning the nomination. Their supporters hoped that in the event of a Dewey-Taft-Stassen deadlock, the convention would turn to their man as a compromise candidate. General MacArthur, the famous war hero, was especially popular among conservatives. Since he was serving in Japan as the Supreme Commander of the Allied Powers occupying that nation, he was unable to campaign for the nomination, but he did make known that he would accept the nomination if it were offered to him, and some conservative Republicans hoped that by winning a primary contest he could prove his popularity with voters. They chose to enter his name in the Wisconsin primary. His candidacy was enthusiastically supported by William Randolph Hearst in all his newspapers.

The "surprise" candidate of 1948 was Stassen, a liberal from Minnesota. In 1938, he had been elected governor of Minnesota at the age of 31; he resigned as governor in 1943 to serve in the wartime Navy. In 1945 he served on the committee that created the United Nations. Stassen was widely regarded as the most liberal of the Republican candidates, yet during the primaries he was criticized for being vague on many issues. Stassen stunned Dewey and MacArthur in the Wisconsin primary; his surprise victory virtually eliminated MacArthur, whose supporters had made a major effort on his behalf. Stassen defeated Dewey again in the Nebraska primary, making him the new frontrunner. He then made the strategic mistake of trying to beat Taft in Ohio, Taft's home state. Stassen believed that if he could defeat Taft in his home state, Taft would be forced to quit the race and most of Taft's delegates would support him instead of Dewey. Taft defeated Stassen in Ohio, and Stassen earned the hostility of the party's conservatives. Even so, Stassen still led Dewey in the polls for the upcoming Oregon primary. Dewey realized that losing another primary would end his chances at the nomination, and made an all-out effort in Oregon.

In April 1948, Dewey sent Paul Lockwood, one of his top aides, to build a strong grassroots organization in Oregon. Working with $150,000 sent by Dewey's powerful New York political organization (three times the previous record spent in an Oregon primary), Lockwood paid "for 126 billboards, hundreds of sixty-second radio spots on every station in the state, and half-hour broadcasts each noon ... The daily Portland Oregonian carried five Dewey advertisements a day." Dewey also extensively campaigned in Oregon, spending three weeks there. He "invaded every hamlet, no matter how isolated, speaking at rural crossroads and shaking hands in hamburger stands. One journalist commented that Dewey was the greatest explorer of Oregon since Lewis and Clark."

Dewey agreed to debate Stassen in Oregon on national radio. Held on May 17, 1948, it was the first-ever radio debate between presidential candidates. The sole issue of the debate was whether to outlaw the Communist Party of the United States. Stassen, despite his liberal reputation, argued in favor of outlawing the party, stating his belief that a network of Soviet-directed Communist spies "within the U.S. demanded immediate, and punitive, response ... Why did Dewey oppose such a ban? Stassen wanted to know." "We must not coddle Communism with legality", Stassen insisted. Dewey—while criticizing Communist totalitarianism and Soviet actions in the Cold War—still forcefully argued against banning the Communist Party: "This outlawing idea is nothing new ... for thousands of years despots have tortured, imprisoned, killed, and exiled their opponents, and their governments have always fallen into the dust." Dewey ended his turn in the debate by saying, "I am unalterably, wholeheartedly, and unswervingly against any scheme to write laws outlawing people because of their religious, political, social, or economic ideas. I am against it because it is a violation of the Constitution of the United States and the Bill of Rights ... I am against it because I know from a great many years of experience in law enforcement that the proposal wouldn't work. Stripped to its naked essentials ... this is nothing but the method of Hitler and Stalin. It is thought control ... an attempt to beat down ideas with a club. It is a surrender of everything we believe in." Surveys showed that from 40 to 80 million people nationwide listened to the debate, and most observers rated Dewey as the winner. Four days after the debate, Dewey defeated Stassen in the Oregon primary. Thereafter, he had the momentum he needed to win his party's nomination for a second straight time.

==== Republican Convention ====
The 1948 Republican National Convention was held in Philadelphia, Pennsylvania. It was the first presidential convention to be shown on national television. At this time, there were 27 television stations in full operation in the U.S. and an estimated 350,000 TV sets in the whole country. As the convention opened, Dewey was believed to have a large lead in the delegate count. His campaign managers, such as Herbert Brownell Jr., Edwin Jaeckle, and J. Russell Sprague, were "as skillful a group of operators as ever manipulated a convention ... it was said at the convention that the Dewey forces "could have won even with Taft" as their candidate." His main opponent, Senator Taft, was hobbled by an ineffective campaign team that one writer called "bumblers", and another historian noted that Taft's campaign manager, Ohio Congressman Clarence J. Brown, "seemed no match for Herbert Brownell ... while the Dewey forces were busy flattering delegates and hinting at promises of patronage, Brown was still worrying about such mundane matters as hotel rooms and seats in the gallery for his friends."

Taft and Stassen, Dewey's leading opponents, met in Taft's hotel suite to plan a "stop-Dewey" movement. But the men refused to unite behind a single candidate to oppose Dewey: "The essence of their impasse was simple. Neither Stassen nor Taft hated Dewey enough to withdraw [in favor of the other], and neither man thought he could get his delegates to follow if he did." Instead, both Taft and Stassen, along with Senator Vandenberg, simply agreed to try to hold their own delegates in the hopes of preventing Dewey from obtaining a majority. This proved futile, as Dewey's efficient campaign team methodically gathered the remaining delegates needed to win the nomination. Stassen tried to contact Eisenhower to ask him to reconsider becoming a candidate, but Eisenhower "could not be reached". After the second round of balloting, Dewey was only 33 votes short of victory. Taft then called Stassen and urged him to withdraw from the race and endorse him as Dewey's main opponent. When Stassen refused, Taft wrote a concession statement and had it read to the convention at the start of the third ballot; at this point the other candidates also dropped out, and Dewey was nominated unanimously by acclamation.

Dewey's campaign team originally wanted Illinois Governor Dwight Green to be his running mate, but the opposition of Colonel Robert R. McCormick, the powerful publisher of the Chicago Tribune, nixed his chances. According to journalist Jules Abels, Dewey managers Brownell, Sprague, and Jaeckle then appeared to offer the vice-presidential nomination to influential Indiana Congressman Charles Halleck, in exchange for Halleck delivering the entire Indiana delegation to Dewey. Halleck did so, but Dewey, who had not been present at the meeting between his managers and Halleck, decided to reject his candidacy, telling his aides "Halleck won't do." After Dewey told Halleck of his decision, Halleck "was first speechless with disbelief and then overcome with emotion." He told Dewey that "you're running out on the Eightieth Congress, and you'll be sorry!" Abels wrote that Dewey's decision to deny Halleck the vice-presidential bid "may have been a fateful one ... Halleck with his forceful personality might have changed the tone of the Dewey campaign, and certainly the issue of the record of the GOP-controlled Eightieth Congress would have to have been met heads on." Instead, Dewey chose popular governor (and future chief justice) Earl Warren of California as his running mate. After the convention, most political experts in the news media rated the Republican ticket as an almost-certain winner over the Democrats.

Delegate count
Candidate	Ballot		
Candidate	1st	2nd	3rd
Thomas E. Dewey	434	515	1094
Robert A. Taft	224	274	0
Harold Stassen	157	149	0
Arthur H. Vandenberg	62	62	0
Earl Warren	59	57	0
Dwight H. Green	56	0	0
Alfred E. Driscoll	35	0	0
Raymond E. Baldwin	19	19	0
Joseph William Martin Jr.	18	10	0
B. Carroll Reece	15	0	0
Douglas MacArthur	11	8	0
Everett Dirksen	1	0	0
Abstaining	1	0	0

=== Progressive Party nomination ===
1948 Progressive Party ticket
Henry A. Wallace	Glen H. Taylor
for President	for Vice President
33rd Vice President of the United States (1941–1945)	U.S. Senator from Idaho (1945–1951)

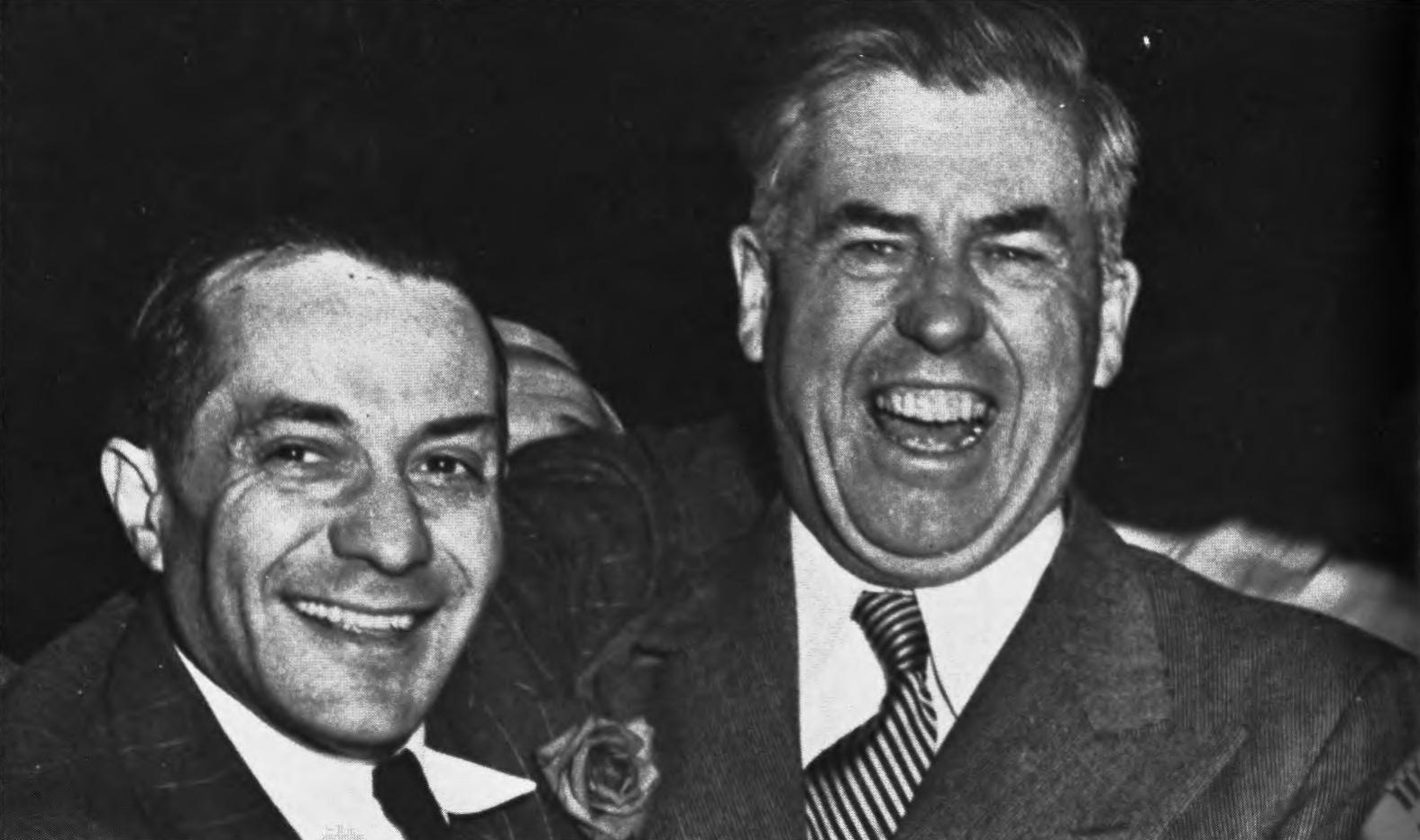
Congressman Vito Marcantonio (left) with former Vice President Henry A. Wallace at New York City's "Lucky Corner" on election eve, November 1, 1948

Meanwhile, the Democratic Party fragmented. A new Progressive Party (the name had been used earlier by Theodore Roosevelt in 1912 and Robert M. La Follette in 1924) was created with the nomination of Henry A. Wallace, who had served as secretary of agriculture, vice president of the United States, and secretary of commerce under Franklin D. Roosevelt. In 1946, President Truman fired Wallace as secretary of commerce when Wallace publicly opposed Truman's firm moves to counter the Soviet Union in the Cold War. Wallace's 1948 platform opposed the Cold War, including the Marshall Plan and Truman Doctrine. The Progressives proposed stronger government regulation and control of Big Business. They also campaigned to end discrimination against blacks and women, backed a minimum wage, and called for the elimination of the House Un-American Activities Committee, which was investigating the possibility of communist spies within the government and labor unions. Wallace and his supporters charged that the committee was violating the civil liberties of government workers and labor unions. The Progressives also generated a great deal of controversy because of the widespread belief that they were secretly controlled by Communists who were more loyal to the Soviet Union than the United States. Wallace himself denied being a Communist, but he repeatedly refused to disavow their support and was quoted as saying that the "Communists are the closest thing to the early Christian martyrs." Walter Reuther, the president of the influential United Auto Workers union, strongly opposed Wallace's candidacy, saying, "people who are not sympathetic with democracy in America are influencing him." Philip Murray, the president of the Congress of Industrial Organizations (CIO), said in April 1948 that "the Communist Party is directly responsible for the creation of the third party [Progressive Party] in the United States."

Wallace was also hurt when Westbrook Pegler, a prominent conservative newspaper columnist, wrote that, as vice president, Wallace had written coded letters discussing prominent leaders such as Franklin Roosevelt and Winston Churchill to his controversial Russian New Age spiritual guru Nicholas Roerich; the letters were nicknamed the "Guru letters." In his book Out of the Jaws of Victory, the journalist Jules Abels wrote: "Personalities were referred to by symbolic titles—Roosevelt was 'The Flaming One', Churchill 'The Roaring Lion', and Cordell Hull 'The Sour One' ... some of the letters were signed 'Wallace', others 'Galahad'", the name that Roerich had assigned Wallace in his cult. This revelation—including direct quotes from the letters—led to much ridicule of Wallace in the national press. The Progressive Party Convention, which was also held in Philadelphia, was a highly contentious affair; several famous newspaper journalists, such as H. L. Mencken and Dorothy Thompson, publicly accused the Progressives of being covertly controlled by Communists. The party's platform was drafted by Lee Pressman, the convention secretary; he later admitted that he had been a member of the Communist party. John Abt served as legal counsel to the convention's permanent chairman, Albert Fitzgerald; he also testified years later that he was a Communist. Rexford Tugwell, a prominent liberal in President Franklin Roosevelt's New Deal, served as the chairman of the party's platform committee. He became convinced that the party was being manipulated by Communists, and was "so heartsick about Communist infiltration of the party that he discussed ... with his wife disaffiliating [from the party] the night before the convention" started. Tugwell later did disassociate himself from the Progressive Party and did not participate in Wallace's fall campaign. A number of other Progressive Party delegates and supporters would quit the party in protest over what they perceived as the undue influence Communists exerted over Wallace, including the prominent American socialist Norman Thomas. In the fall, Thomas would run as the Socialist Party presidential candidate to offer liberals a non-Communist alternative to Wallace.

Senator Glen H. Taylor from Idaho, an eccentric figure who was known as a "singing cowboy" and who had ridden his horse Nugget up the steps of the United States Capitol after winning election to the Senate in 1944, was named as Wallace's running mate. Although he was a member of the Democratic Party, Taylor accepted the Progressive Party's vice-presidential nomination, saying: "I am not leaving the Democratic Party. It left me. Wall Street and the military have taken over the Democratic Party." After receiving the nomination, Taylor told reporters that there was a difference between "pink" Communists and "red" Communists. He said "pink" Communists would support the Wallace-Taylor ticket because they believed in a "peaceful revolution" to turn the government to left-wing beliefs, but "red" Communists would support the Republican ticket in the belief that they would cause another Great Depression, which would give Communists the chance to take over.

In the fall campaign, the Wallace-Taylor ticket made a Southern tour, where both Wallace and Taylor insisted on speaking to racially integrated audiences, in defiance of Southern custom and law at the time. In several North Carolina cities Wallace was hit by a total of "twenty-seven eggs, thirty-seven tomatoes, six peaches, and two lemons." When he left the state he announced: "As Jesus Christ said, if at any time they will not listen to you willingly, then shake the dust off from your feet and go elsewhere." He ate only in unsegregated restaurants, traveled with a black secretary, and in Mississippi had to be escorted by police for protection. His aide Clark Foreman admitted that Wallace wanted to stir up controversy for the publicity it would receive in more liberal areas in the North and West. But as the campaign progressed, Wallace's crowds thinned and his standing in the polls dropped. Wallace was hurt by the successful effort of labor unions to keep their members in the Democratic column, and by controversial statements from Progressives supporting "appeasement with Russia." Wallace himself attacked Winston Churchill as a "racist" and "imperialist", and Taylor was criticized for a speech in which he said that the "Nazis are running the U.S. government. So why should Russia make peace with them? If I were a Russian ... I would not agree to anything ... we are aggressively preparing for war."

Wallace's support in polling fell from 11% in a January poll by Roper Center for Public Opinion Research to 6% by June and 4% by October. He traveled over 55,000 miles during the campaign. The Wallace-Taylor ticket finished fourth in the election, winning 1,157,328 votes (2.4%). This was only slightly less than the States' Rights Party, but the Progressive Party received no electoral votes.

=== States' Rights Democratic Party nomination ===
1948 States' Rights Democratic Party ticket
Strom Thurmond	Fielding L. Wright
for President	for Vice President
103rd Governor of South Carolina (1947–1951)	49th and 50th Governor of Mississippi (1946–1952)

In some southern states, Strom Thurmond had managed to obtain the Democratic Party line, but in the majority he had to run under the label of the States' Rights Democratic Party. Only in those states in which he ran under the standard Democratic Party label did he win, his best performance as a third-party candidate being a distant second in Georgia.

Southern Democrats had become increasingly disturbed by Truman's support of civil rights, particularly after his executive order racially integrating the U.S. armed forces and a civil rights message he sent to Congress in February 1948. At the Southern Governor's Conference in Wakulla Springs, Florida, on February 6, Mississippi Governor Fielding Wright proposed forming a new third party to protect racial segregation in the South. On May 10, 1948, the governors of the eleven states of the former Confederacy, along with other high-ranking Southern officials, met in Jackson, Mississippi, to discuss their concerns about the growing civil rights movement within the Democratic Party. At the meeting, South Carolina Governor Strom Thurmond criticized Truman's civil rights agenda, and the governors discussed ways to oppose it.

The Southern Democrats who had walked out of the Democratic National Convention to protest the civil rights platform approved by the convention and supported by Truman met at Municipal Auditorium in Birmingham, Alabama, on July 17, 1948, and formed yet another political party, which they named the States' Rights Democratic Party. More commonly known as the "Dixiecrats", the party's main goal was continuing the policy of racial segregation in the South and the Jim Crow laws that sustained it. Thurmond, who had led the walkout, became the party's presidential nominee after the convention's initial favorite, Arkansas Governor Benjamin Laney, withdrew his name from consideration. Governor Wright of Mississippi received the vice-presidential nomination. The Dixiecrats had no chance of winning the election, since they could not get on the ballot in enough states to win the necessary electoral votes. Their strategy was to take enough Southern states from Truman to force the election into the United States House of Representatives under the provisions of the Twelfth Amendment, where they could then extract concessions from either Truman or Dewey on racial issues in exchange for their support. Even if Dewey won the election outright, the Dixiecrats hoped that their defection would show that the Democratic Party needed Southern support to win national elections, and that this would weaken the pro-civil rights movement among Northern and Western Democrats. But the Dixiecrats were weakened when most Southern Democratic leaders (such as Governor Herman Talmadge of Georgia and "Boss" E. H. Crump of Tennessee) refused to support them. Despite being an incumbent president, Truman was not placed on the ballot in Alabama.

In Louisiana, Mississippi, Alabama, and South Carolina, the party was able to be labeled as the main Democratic Party ticket on the local ballots on election night. Outside those four states, it was listed only as a third-party ticket.

=== Socialist Party nomination ===
1948 Socialist Party ticket
Norman Thomas	Tucker P. Smith
for President	for Vice President
Socialist Party Chairman (1936–1944)	Economics professor

Although it had initially appeared that the Socialist Party of America would refrain from nominating its own candidate and instead endorse Wallace's run, policy differences and Wallace's refusal to publicly repudiate the support of communists caused them to break with the Progressive Party and nominate their own ticket. The party therefore nominated Norman Thomas, a five-time Socialist nominee and the former party chairman, as president, and Tucker P. Smith, an economics professor, as vice president.

The party's ticket was nominated at its convention, held May 7-9 in Reading, Pennsylvania.

Thomas debated Farrell Dobbs, the nominee of the Socialist Workers Party, during the general election. This was the first debate between general election presidential candidates. Edward A. Teichert, the nominee of the Socialist Labor Party of America, had challenged Thomas to a debate, but Teichert declined after Thomas asked for Dobbs to also be invited.

Presidential ballot
Norman Thomas	200

=== Christian Nationalist Party nomination ===
This party nominated Gerald L. K. Smith, a leader of the Share Our Wealth movement during the Great Depression, founder of the Christian Nationalist Crusade, and founder of the America First Party for which he was presidential candidate (1944). Smith's name appeared on ballots in 17 states.

== General election ==
=== Polling ===
Poll source	Date(s) administered	Harry Truman (D)	Thomas Dewey (R)	Strom Thurmond (SR)	Henry Wallace (P)	Other	Undecided	Margin
Election Results	November 2, 1948	49.55%	45.07%	2.41%	2.37%	0.60%	-	4.48
Gallup	October 15–25, 1948	44.5%	49.5%	2%	4%	-	-	5
Gallup	September 23–28, 1948	40%	46%	2%	4%	-	8%	6
Gallup	September 10–15, 1948	39.0%	46.5%	2%	3.5%	-	9%	7.5
Roper	September 9, 1948 (Note: The publication date is used, as the dates of the survey were not given in the source)	31.4%	44.2%	4.4%	3.6%	1%	15.4%	12.8
Gallup	September 2–7, 1948	39.0%	46.5%	2%	3.5%	-	9%	7.5
Gallup	August 20–25, 1948	36.5%	48.5%	-	5%	-	10%	12
Gallup	August 13–18, 1948	37%	48%	2%	4%	-	10%	11
Roper	August 13, 1948	31.5%	46.3%	-	3%	2.6%	16.6%	14.8
Gallup	July 16–21, 1948	37%	48%	-	5%	-	10%	11
Roper	July 15, 1948	28.2%	50.5%	-	4%	-	17.3%	22.3
July 12–15: Democratic National Convention
June 21–25: Republican National Convention
Roper	June 17, 1948	33.7%	41.3%	-	6.3%	-	16.6%	7.6
Gallup	May 28-Jun. 2, 1948	38%	49%	-	6%	-	7%	11
Gallup	March 19–24, 1948	39%	47%	-	7%	-	7%	8
Gallup	January 2–7, 1948	46%	41%	-	7%	-	6%	5
Gallup	July 4–9, 1947	45.9%	44.1%	-	-	-	10%	1.8

=== Fall campaign ===
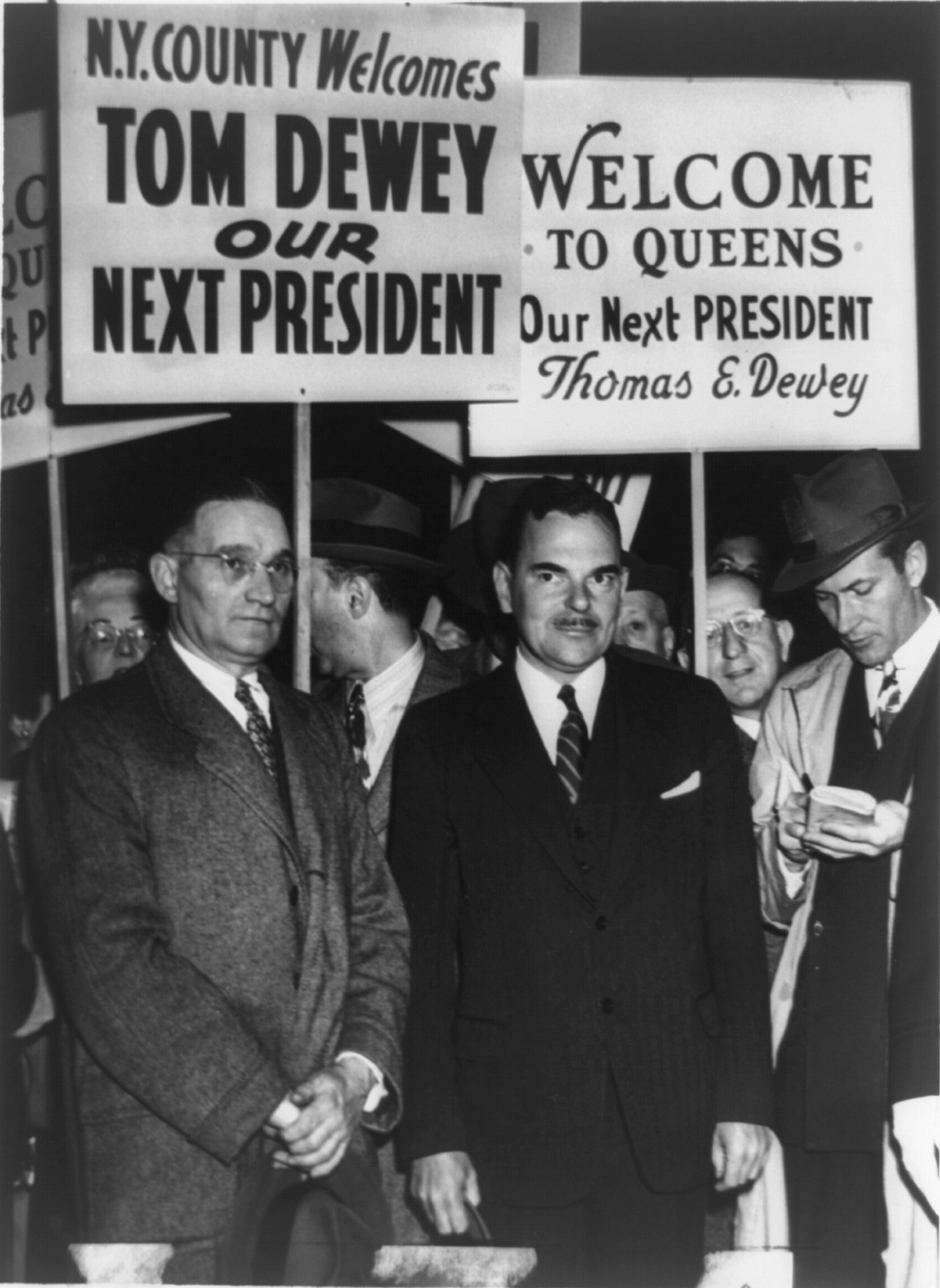
Dewey during a campaign tour in New York

"I'm Just Wild About Harry"
Instrumental version of "I'm Just Wild About Harry", used as a campaign song by the Truman campaign. Duration 3:54.

Given Truman's sinking popularity and the seemingly fatal three-way split in the Democratic Party, Dewey appeared so unbeatable that top Republicans believed that all he had to do to win was avoid major mistakes. Following this advice, Dewey carefully avoided risks and spoke in platitudes, avoiding controversial issues and remaining vague on what he planned to do as president, with speech after speech being nonpartisan and filled with optimistic assertions or empty statements of the obvious, including the famous line "You know that your future is still ahead of you." An editorial in the Louisville Courier-Journal summed it up:

No presidential candidate in the future will be so inept that four of his major speeches can be boiled down to these historic four sentences: Agriculture is important. Our rivers are full of fish. You cannot have freedom without liberty. Our future lies ahead.

Another writer noted the "one broad issue that Dewey set forth in the campaign was unity ... but [he] was oversold on an issue which had no visceral appeal to the average American. It was hard to understand what Dewey was driving at. Sometimes it seemed that he was asking Americans to achieve unity by being united behind him." On the other hand, Truman's campaign strategist Clark Clifford said that Truman's campaign was "pitched to four distinct interest groups—labor, the farmer, the Negro, and the consumer. Every move had these four interest groups in mind." Since he was trailing in the polls, Truman ran a slashing, no-holds-barred campaign. He ridiculed Dewey by name, criticized his refusal to address specific issues, and scornfully targeted the Republican-controlled 80th Congress with a wave of relentless and blistering partisan assaults. Truman said, "the Communists are rooting for a GOP victory because they know it would bring on another Great Depression." In several speeches, he said that "GOP" actually stood for "gluttons of privilege" and that Republicans were "princes of privilege" and "bloodsuckers with offices on Wall Street." He told one audience, "The Republicans have begun to nail the American consumer to the wall with spikes of greed." At the National Plowing Contest in Dexter, Iowa, he told 80,000 farmers in attendance, "this Republican Congress has already stuck a pitchfork in the farmer's back" to rapturous applause.

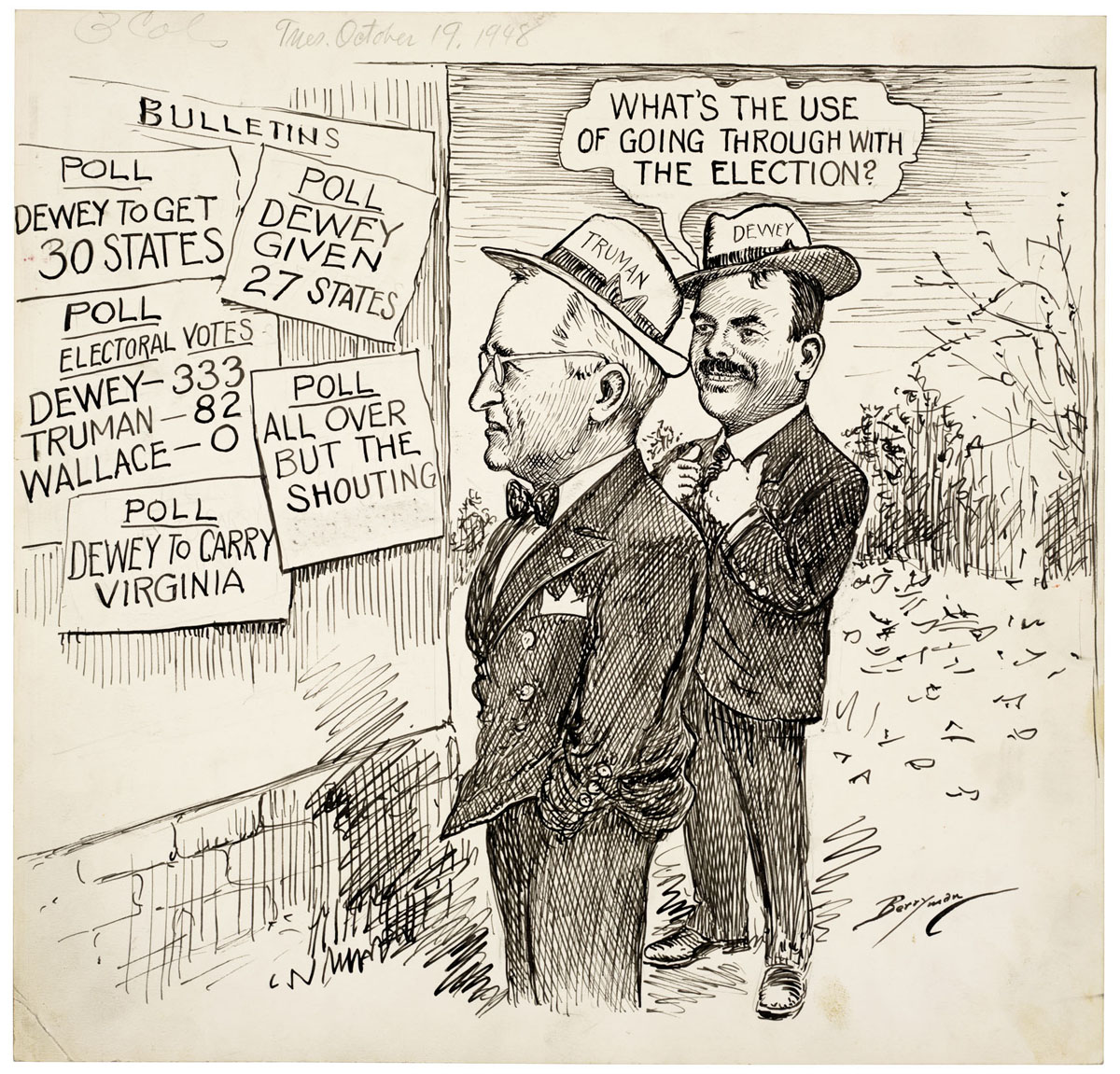
Clifford K. Berryman's editorial cartoon of October 19, 1948, shows the consensus of experts in mid-October.

Truman nicknamed the Republican-controlled Congress the "worst", "do-nothing" Congress, a remark that brought strong criticism from Republican Congressional leaders (such as Taft), but no comment from Dewey. Dewey rarely mentioned Truman during the campaign, which fit into his strategy of appearing to be above petty partisan politics. Under Dewey's leadership, the Republicans had enacted a platform at their 1948 convention that called for expanding Social Security, more funding for public housing, civil rights legislation, and promotion of health and education by the federal government. These positions were unacceptable to the conservative Congressional Republican leadership; Truman exploited this rift by calling a special session of Congress on "Turnip Day" (referring to an old piece of Missouri folklore about planting turnips in late July) and daring the Republican Congressional leadership to pass its own platform.

The 80th Congress played into Truman's hands, delivering very little in the way of substantive legislation during this time. Truman simply ignored that Dewey's policies were considerably more liberal than most of his fellow Republicans' and concentrated his fire against what he called the conservative, obstructionist tendencies of the unpopular 80th Congress. Truman toured much of the nation with his fiery rhetoric, playing to large, enthusiastic crowds. "Give 'em hell, Harry" was a popular slogan shouted at stops along the tour.

The polls and the pundits held that Dewey's lead was insurmountable and that Truman's efforts were for naught. Truman's own staff considered the campaign a last hurrah. Even Truman's wife, Bess, doubted her husband could win; the only person who appears to have considered Truman's campaign viable was Truman himself, who confidently predicted victory to anyone who would listen. Near the end of the campaign, he privately wrote a state-by-state electoral vote prediction and gave it to his aide, George Elsey. Truman believed he would win with 340 electoral votes to 108 for Dewey, 42 for Thurmond, and 37 marked doubtful (he accidentally left out four electoral votes).

In the campaign's final weeks, American movie theaters played two short, newsreel-like campaign films in support of the two major-party candidates, both created by their respective campaign organizations. The Dewey film, shot professionally on an impressive budget, had very high production values but somehow reinforced an image of Dewey as cautious and distant. The Truman film, hastily assembled on virtually no budget by the perpetually cash-short Truman campaign, relied heavily on public-domain and newsreel footage of the president taking part in major world events and signing important legislation. Perhaps unintentionally, the Truman film visually reinforced an image of him as engaged and decisive. Years later, historian David McCullough cited the expensive but lackluster Dewey film and the far cheaper but more effective Truman film as important factors in determining the preferences of undecided voters. As the campaign drew to a close, the polls showed Truman was gaining: though Truman lost all nine of the Gallup Poll's post-convention surveys, Dewey's Gallup lead dropped from 17 points in late September to nine in mid-October and five by the end of the month, just above the poll's margin of error. Although Truman was gaining momentum, most political analysts were reluctant to break with the conventional wisdom and consider a Truman victory a real possibility.

On September 9, nearly two months before election day, pollster Elmo Roper announced, "Thomas E. Dewey is almost as good as elected. ... I can think of nothing duller or more intellectually barren than acting like a sports announcer who feels he must pretend he is witnessing a neck-and-neck race." Roper stopped polling voters until the week before the election, when he took another poll. It showed "a slight shift to Truman; it still gave Dewey a heavy lead, however, so he decided not to hedge his bet." One poll showing strong Truman support in the rural Midwest was sponsored by the Staley Milling Company, which "polled farmers by giving them a choice of a donkey or an elephant on chicken feed sacks. When the results among 20,000 farmers showed up as fifty-four percent to forty-six percent for the donkey, the poll was abandoned."

When Dewey considered adopting a more aggressive stance after noticing that his crowds were dwindling, Herbert Brownell contacted 90 GOP state committeemen and committeewomen in all 48 states. With one exception, they "urged [Dewey] to press forward on the high road" his campaign had taken and to continue to ignore Truman's attacks. The sole exception was Kansas committeeman Harry Darby, who warned Dewey and his managers "that farmers were in a mutinous mood" and recommended that Dewey take a tougher and more aggressive stance. But with all the polls still showing Dewey ahead and no other committee member supporting Darby, his advice was rejected.

In the campaign's final days, many newspapers, magazines, and political pundits were so confident of Dewey's victory that they wrote articles to be printed the morning after the election speculating about Dewey's presidency: Life magazine printed a large photo in its final edition before the election, labeled "The Next President Travels by Ferry Boat over the Broad Waters of San Francisco Bay", that showed Dewey and his staff riding across the city's harbor. In its "final 1948 election preview", Newsweek magazine surveyed 50 "of the nation's top political writers" and all 50 predicted a Dewey victory. Several well-known and influential newspaper columnists, such as Drew Pearson and Joseph Alsop, wrote columns to be printed the morning after the election speculating about Dewey's choices for his cabinet; the day before the election, Pearson wrote that a Truman victory was "impossible" and his column printed the day after the election said that Pearson had "surveyed the close knit group around Tom Dewey who will take over the White House 86 days from now."

Walter Winchell reported that gambling odds were 15 to 1 against Truman. More than 500 newspapers, accounting for over 78% of the nation's total circulation, endorsed Dewey. Truman had 182 endorsements, accounting for just 10% of America's newspaper readership, and surpassed by Thurmond, who got the remaining 12% from many Southern papers. Alistair Cooke, the distinguished writer for the Manchester Guardian newspaper in the United Kingdom, published an article on the day of the election titled "Harry S. Truman: A Study of a Failure." For its television coverage, NBC News had constructed a large cardboard model of the White House containing two elephants that would pop out when NBC announced Dewey's victory; since Truman's defeat was considered certain, no donkeys were placed in it.

As Truman made his way to his hometown of Independence, Missouri, to await the election returns, some in his inner circle had already accepted other jobs, no reporter on his campaign train thought he would win, and several prominent Republicans had already bought homes in Washington.

=== Results ===
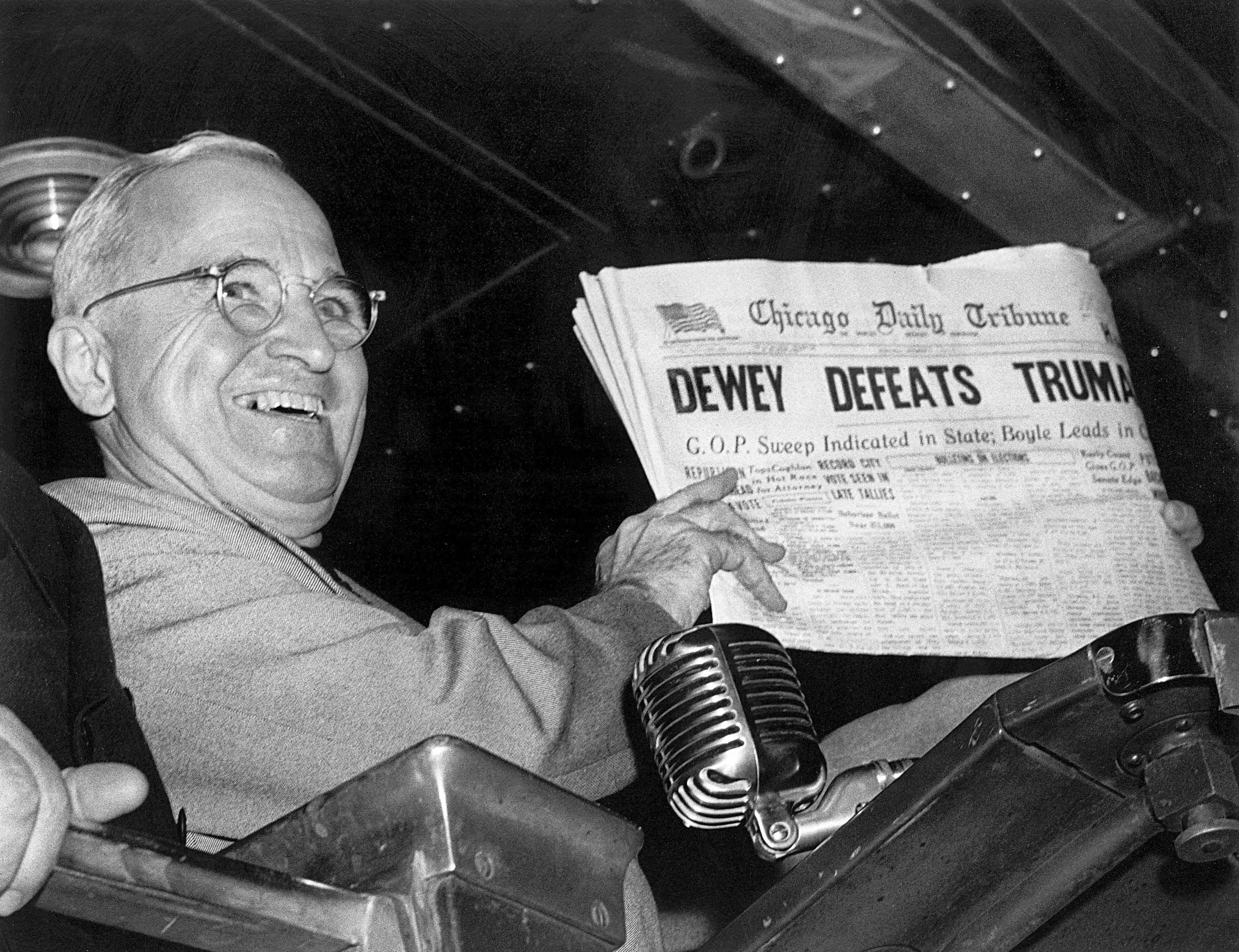
Famous photograph of Truman grinning and holding up a copy of the newspaper that erroneously announced his defeat

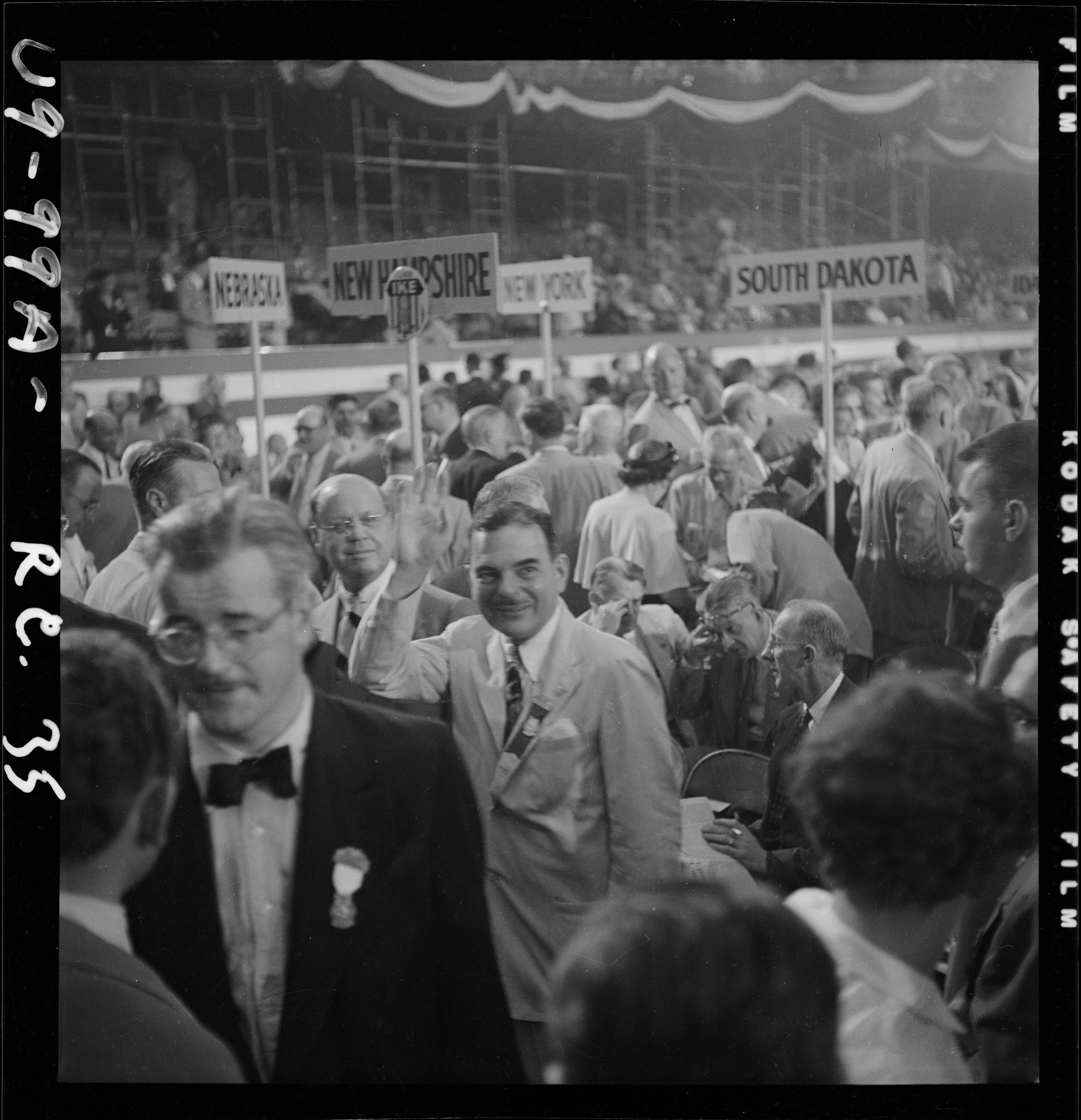
Thomas E. Dewey, governor of New York, waving from floor of convention hall

On election night, Dewey, his family, and campaign staff confidently gathered in the Roosevelt Hotel in New York City to await the returns. Truman, aided by the Secret Service, sneaked away from reporters outside his home in Independence and went to nearby Excelsior Springs, Missouri. There, he took a room in the historic Elms Hotel, had dinner and a Turkish bath, and went to sleep. As the votes came in, Truman took an early lead that he never lost. The leading radio commentators, such as H. V. Kaltenborn of NBC, still confidently predicted that once the "late returns" came in Dewey would overcome Truman's lead. At midnight, Truman woke and turned on the radio in his room; he heard Kaltenborn announce that while Truman was still ahead in the popular vote, he could not possibly win. At 4 a.m., Truman woke again and heard on the radio that his popular-vote lead was now nearly two million votes, and that he was well ahead in the electoral vote. He told the Secret Service agents guarding him to drive him to his campaign headquarters in Kansas City "because it looks as if we're in for another four years". For the rest of his life, Truman gleefully mimicked Kaltenborn's staccato voice predicting his defeat throughout that election night. Dewey, meanwhile, realized he was in trouble when early returns from New England and New York showed him running well behind his expected vote total. He stayed up all night and into the morning analyzing the votes as they came in, and by 10:30 a.m., he was convinced he had lost; at 11:14 a.m., he sent Truman a gracious telegram of concession.

The pro-Republican Chicago Daily Tribune was so certain of Dewey's victory that it printed an early morning edition with "DEWEY DEFEATS TRUMAN" as its banner headline. Part of the reason Truman's victory came as such a shock was because of uncorrected flaws in the emerging craft of public opinion polling. According to historian William Manchester, "many professional pollsters ... believed in what some had come to call Farley's Law." James Farley, Franklin Roosevelt's campaign manager in 1932 and 1936, had said he believed the great majority of voters decided which candidate to support during the political conventions. The fall campaigns, Farley believed, were simply "ineffective carnivals" that swayed few voters. In 1948, many pollsters, relying on Farley's Law, believed that the election was effectively over after the Republican and Democratic conventions, and discounted the impact of Truman's campaigning that fall.

Manchester wrote, "Gallup's September 24 report foresaw 46.5% for Dewey to 38% for Truman. His last column, appearing in the Sunday papers two days before the election, showed Truman gaining sharply—to 44%—and the interviews on which it was based had been conducted two weeks earlier. The national mood was shifting daily, almost hourly." After the election, a University of Michigan study found that "14% of Truman's voters, or 3,374,800, had decided to vote for him in the last fortnight of the campaign". Gallup and Roper also analyzed the votes; they "learned that one voter in every seven (6,927,000) made up his mind in the last two weeks before the election. Of these, 75 percent picked Truman", which was more than his margin of victory over Dewey. "Using either the Michigan figures or Gallup-Roper's, one finds that some 3,300,000 fence-sitters determined the outcome of the race in its closing days—when Dewey's instincts were urging him to adopt Truman's hell-for-leather style and slug it out with him, and when he didn't because all the experts told him he shouldn't."

The key states in the 1948 election were Ohio, California, and Illinois. Truman won each of them by less than 1 percentage point; they gave him a total of 78 electoral votes. Had Dewey carried all three—which would have required a shift of just 29,000 votes—he would have won the election in the Electoral College despite losing the popular vote by 2.13 million votes (or 4.36%). If Dewey had won any two of the three, no nominee would have reached the 266 electoral votes required for election, and the Dixiecrats would have succeeded in forcing the election into the House of Representatives.

The extreme closeness of the vote in these three states was the major reason Dewey waited until late on the morning of November 3 to concede. Aside from Ohio, California, and Illinois, Truman carried Idaho by almost as narrow a margin, and Dewey had similarly narrow victories in New York (the nation's largest electoral prize at the time), his birth state of Michigan, and Maryland. This was too little to win him the election. Dewey believed he lost the election because he lost the rural vote in the Midwest, which he had won in 1944 (note the Kaltenborn predictions that Truman would joyously mock had taken for granted that the "country vote" would go to Dewey).

Of the 3,096 counties/independent cities making returns, Truman won the most popular votes in 1,639 (52.94%), while Dewey carried 1,190 (38.44%). Thurmond prevailed in 265 counties (8.56%) while two counties (0.06%) in South Dakota split evenly between Truman and Dewey.

Truman's net vote totals in the 12 largest cities, which was around 1,481,000, had decreased by 750,000 from Roosevelt's results in the 1944 election, which was around 2,230,000. If all the votes Wallace received had gone to Truman, only the states of Maryland, Michigan, and New York would have flipped.

Journalist Samuel Lubell found in his post-1948 survey of voters that Truman, not Dewey, seemed the safer, more conservative candidate to the "new middle class" that had developed over the previous 20 years. He wrote that "to an appreciable part of the electorate, the Democrats had replaced the Republicans as the party of prosperity" during and after the war. Lubell quoted a man who, when asked why he did not vote Republican after moving to the suburbs, answered: "I own a nice home, have a new car and am much better off than my parents were. I've been a Democrat all my life. Why should I change?" Dewey's promise of a "great house cleaning" in Washington worried an Iowa minister who wanted to retain farm subsidies for parishioners; he voted Democratic for the first time in his church's history. Truman received a record number of Catholic votes, exceeding even the Catholic support of Al Smith in 1928, in part because Wallace drew leftists away from the Democrats.

Another reason for Dewey's surprise defeat was his complacent, distant approach to the campaign, and his failure to respond to Truman's attacks. Journalist Jules Abels wrote: "the election was not thrown away by indifference or lack of effort. Preparation and more preparation had always been the distinguishing characteristic of Dewey and his team throughout his career ... The truth is that Dewey's campaign was the result not of careless, but too careful and painstaking, calculation. The Dewey campaign was frozen into inertia not because it had been underthought, but because it had been overthought."

Other possible factors in Truman's victory include his aggressive, populist campaign style; broad public approval of Truman's foreign policy, notably the Berlin Airlift of that year; and widespread dissatisfaction with the institution Truman called the "do-nothing, good-for-nothing 80th Republican Congress." In addition, after suffering a relatively severe recession in 1946 and 1947 (in which real GDP dropped by 12% and inflation went over 15%), the economy began recovering in 1948. It was a banner year for the Democrats, as they not only retained the presidency but also recaptured both houses of Congress. It was also an unprecedented fifth consecutive presidential victory for the party, continuing what remains its only winning streak of more than two presidential elections since the Civil War. Since 1948, there has been only one streak of three consecutive presidential victories by any party (in that case, the Republicans).

The two largest third parties did not hurt Truman nearly as much as expected, as Thurmond's Dixiecrats carried only four Southern states, fewer than predicted, and all of which listed Thurmond as the Democratic nominee; Thurmond did not come close to carrying any of the other states in which he ran, with his best showing among them being second place, with 20.3% of the vote, in Georgia. The Dixiecrats also failed to draw off enough Truman voters to throw any of his states to Dewey. The nearest they came in this regard was in Virginia, where the 25.0% margin Roosevelt won by in 1944 was reduced to 6.9%. The civil rights platform helped Truman win large majorities among black voters in the populous Northern and Midwestern states, and may well have made the difference for Truman in states such as Illinois and Ohio. Wallace's Progressives received only 2.4% of the national popular vote, well below their expected vote total and slightly less than the Dixiecrats, and Wallace did not take as many liberal votes from Truman as many pundits had predicted. Some analysts, including author Zachary Karabell, have even argued that the separate candidacies of Wallace and Thurmond were beneficial to Truman by removing the separate taints of communism and racism from the Democratic Party. The split of the Democratic Party, while failing to defeat Truman, did hold the Democrats back in several narrow states. Had the Wallace and Thurmond vote been in the Democratic column, Truman would have won all the Thurmond states (Louisiana, Mississippi, Alabama, and South Carolina), and the Wallace vote would have flipped Michigan, Maryland, and New York to Truman. Winning these states would have put Truman at 416 electoral votes to Dewey's 115. This still would have been a decline of Democratic electoral votes since 1940, but Truman would have gotten 54.33% of the popular vote, an increase of 0.94% from Roosevelt's last victory.

This was the last election where the Prohibition Party and the Socialist Party of America presidential candidate received over 100,000 votes.

This was the last election until 1996 in which the Democrats won Arizona and the last until 1964 in which they won California, Colorado, Florida, Idaho, Iowa, Montana, Ohio, Oklahoma, Tennessee, Utah, Virginia, Washington, Wisconsin, and Wyoming. It was also the last election until 1964 in which South Carolina did not vote for the official Democratic nominee. Thurmond's 2.4% is the lowest popular vote percentage for a candidate who won all of a state's electoral votes. The 1948 presidential election contrasted with other elections across the world during this period, as Truman was a war leader (Churchill and De Gaulle both left office shortly after the end of the war). This was the first election since 1836 in which a Democratic presidential nominee won the presidency without South Carolina, and the first ever in which a Democrat won the presidency without Louisiana, Alabama, and Mississippi. Furthermore, this is the last time a Democratic presidential nominee won without New York, Pennsylvania, Maryland, and Delaware. It is also the first of two occasions since 1916 that Oregon and Washington did not support the same party (the other was 1968). This election is the only time since 1888 that New Jersey and Illinois did not support the same party.

Electoral results
Presidential candidate	Party	Home state	Popular vote		Electoral vote	Running mate		
Presidential candidate	Party	Home state	Count	Percentage	Electoral vote	Vice-presidential candidate	Home state	Electoral vote
Harry S. Truman (incumbent)	Democratic (Note: In New York, the Truman vote was a fusion of the Democratic and Liberal slates. There, Truman obtained 2,557,642 votes on the Democratic ticket and 222,562 votes on the Liberal ticket.)	Missouri	24,178,347	49.55%	303	Alben W. Barkley	Kentucky	303
Thomas E. Dewey	Republican (Note: In Mississippi, the Dewey vote was a fusion of the Republican and Independent Republican slates. There, Dewey obtained 2,595 votes on the Republican ticket and 2,448 votes on the Independent Republican ticket.)	New York	21,991,292	45.07%	189	Earl Warren	California	189
Strom Thurmond	States' Rights Democratic	South Carolina	1,176,023	2.41%	39	Fielding L. Wright	Mississippi	39
Henry A. Wallace	Wallace Progressive/American Labor	New York	1,157,328	2.37%	0	Glen H. Taylor	Idaho	0
Norman Thomas	Socialist	New York	139,569	0.29%	0	Tucker P. Smith	Michigan	0
Claude A. Watson	Prohibition	California	103,708	0.21%	0	Dale Learn	Pennsylvania	0
Edward A. Teichert	Socialist Labor	Pennsylvania	29,244	0.06%	0	Stephen Emery	New York	0
Farrell Dobbs	Socialist Workers	Minnesota	13,613	0.03%	0	Grace Carlson	Minnesota	0
Other			3,504	0.01%	—	Other		—
Total			48,793,535	100%	531			531
Needed to win					266			266

Popular vote
Truman	49.55%
Dewey	45.07%
Thurmond	2.41%
Wallace	2.37%
Others	0.60%

Electoral vote
Truman	57.06%
Dewey	35.59%
Thurmond	7.34%

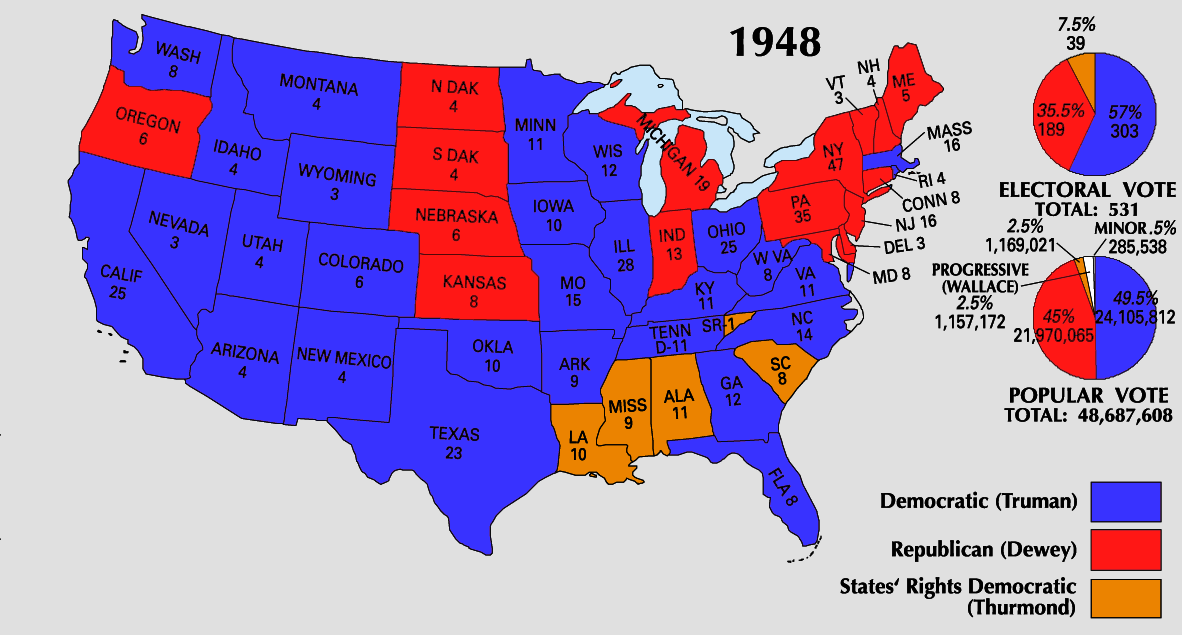

Results by county, shaded according to winning candidate's percentage of the vote

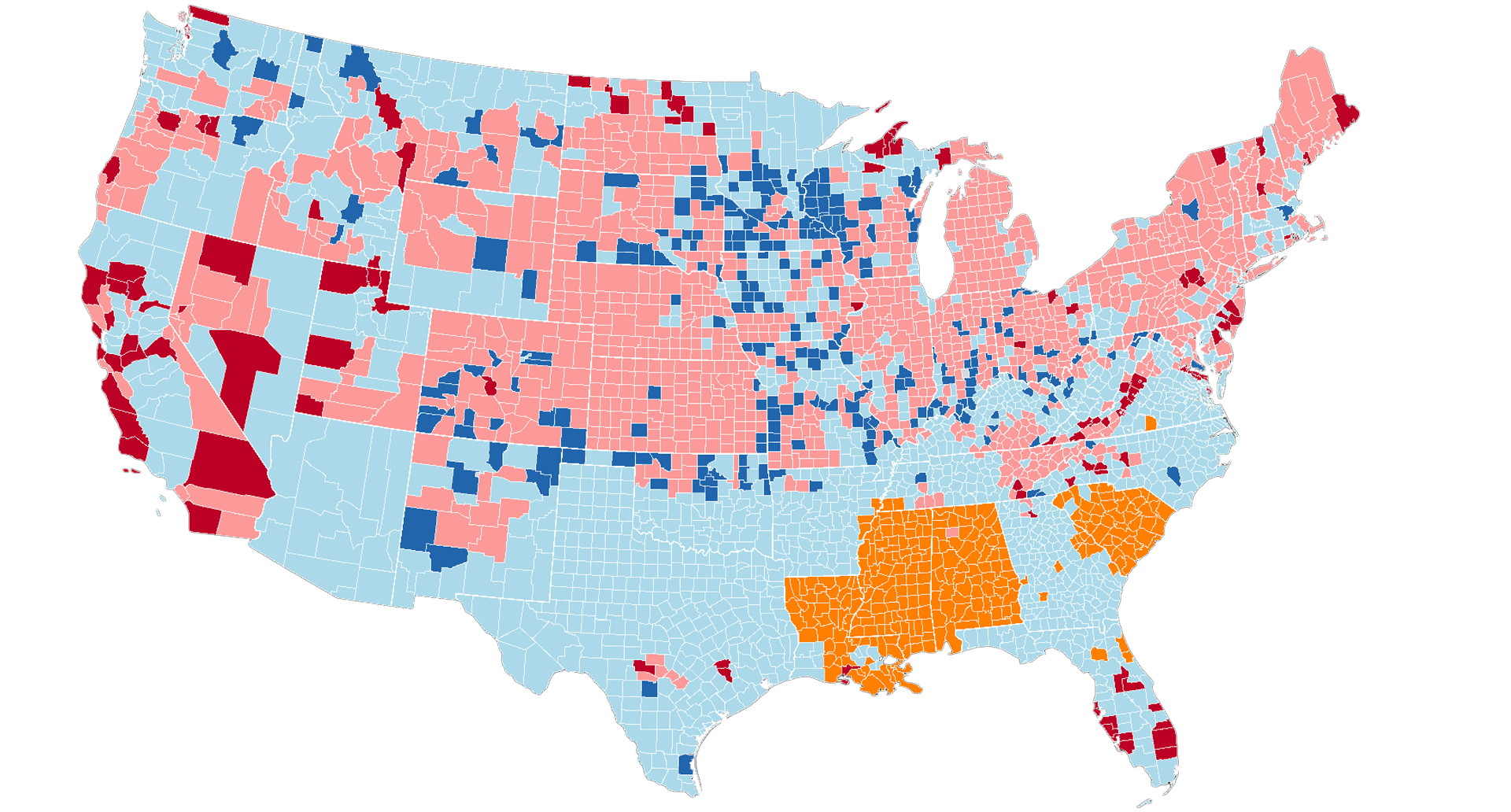
1948 county flips from 1944. Dark red indicates a Republican flip, while dark blue indicates a Democratic flip.

State-level performance for Henry A. Wallace's presidential campaign, 1948

=== Results by state ===
States/districts won by Truman/Barkley
States/districts won by Dewey/Warren
States/districts won by Thurmond/Wright

		Harry S. Truman Democratic			Thomas E. Dewey Republican			J. Strom Thurmond Dixiecrat			Henry Wallace Progressive			Norman Thomas Socialist			Other			Margin		State total	
State	electoral votes	#	%	electoral votes	#	%	electoral votes	#	%	electoral votes	#	%	electoral votes	#	%	electoral votes	#	%	electoral votes	#	%	#	
Alabama	11	-	-	-	40,930	19.04	-	171,443	79.75	11	1,522	0.71	-	-	-	-	1,085	0.50	-	-130,513	-60.71	214,980	AL
Arizona	4	95,251	53.79	4	77,597	43.82	-	-	-	-	3,310	1.87	-	-	-	-	907	0.51	-	17,654	9.97	177,065	AZ
Arkansas	9	149,659	61.72	9	50,959	21.02	-	40,068	16.52	-	751	0.31	-	1,037	0.43	-	1	0.00	-	98,700	40.71	242,475	AR
California	25	1,913,134	47.57	25	1,895,269	47.13	-	1,228	0.03	-	190,381	4.73	-	3,459	0.09	-	18,067	0.45	-	17,865	0.44	4,021,538	CA
Colorado	6	267,288	51.88	6	239,714	46.52	-	-	-	-	6,115	1.19	-	1,678	0.33	-	442	0.09	-	27,574	5.35	515,237	CO
Connecticut	8	423,297	47.91	-	437,754	49.55	8	-	-	-	13,713	1.55	-	6,964	0.79	-	1,790	0.20	-	-14,457	-1.64	883,518	CT
Delaware	3	67,813	48.76	-	69,588	50.04	3	-	-	-	1,050	0.75	-	250	0.18	-	372	0.27	-	-1,775	-1.28	139,073	DE
Florida	8	281,988	48.82	8	194,280	33.63	-	89,755	15.54	-	11,620	2.01	-	-	-	-	-	-	-	87,708	15.18	577,643	FL
Georgia	12	254,646	60.80	12	76,691	18.31	-	85,135	20.33	-	1,636	0.39	-	3	0.00	-	733	0.18	-	169,591	40.50	418,764	GA
Idaho	4	107,370	49.98	4	101,514	47.26	-	-	-	-	4,972	2.31	-	332	0.15	-	628	0.29	-	5,856	2.73	214,816	ID
Illinois	28	1,994,715	50.07	28	1,961,103	49.22	-	-	-	-	-	-	-	11,522	0.29	-	16,706	0.42	-	33,612	0.84	3,984,046	IL
Indiana	13	807,833	48.78	-	821,079	49.58	13	-	-	-	9,649	0.58	-	2,179	0.13	-	15,474	0.93	-	-13,246	-0.80	1,656,214	IN
Iowa	10	522,380	50.31	10	494,018	47.58	-	-	-	-	12,125	1.17	-	1,829	0.18	-	7,912	0.76	-	28,362	2.73	1,038,264	IA
Kansas	8	351,902	44.61	-	423,039	53.63	8	-	-	-	4,603	0.58	-	2,807	0.36	-	6,468	0.82	-	-71,137	-9.02	788,819	KS
Kentucky	11	466,756	56.74	11	341,210	41.48	-	10,411	1.27	-	1,567	0.19	-	1,284	0.16	-	1,430	0.17	-	125,546	15.26	822,658	KY
Louisiana	10	136,344	32.75	-	72,657	17.45	-	204,290	49.07	10	3,035	0.73	-	-	-	-	10	0.00	-	-67,946	-16.32	416,336	LA
Maine	5	111,916	42.27	-	150,234	56.74	5	-	-	-	1,884	0.71	-	547	0.21	-	206	0.08	-	-38,318	-14.47	264,787	ME
Maryland	8	286,521	48.01	-	294,814	49.40	8	2,489	0.42	-	9,983	1.67	-	2,941	0.49	-	-	-	-	-8,293	-1.39	596,735	MD
Massachusetts	16	1,151,788	54.66	16	909,370	43.16	-	-	-	-	38,157	1.81	-	-	-	-	7,831	0.37	-	242,418	11.50	2,107,146	MA
Michigan	19	1,003,448	47.57	-	1,038,595	49.23	19	-	-	-	46,515	2.20	-	6,063	0.29	-	14,988	0.71	-	-35,147	-1.67	2,109,609	MI
Minnesota	11	692,966	57.16	11	483,617	39.89	-	-	-	-	27,866	2.30	-	4,646	0.38	-	3,131	0.26	-	209,349	17.27	1,212,226	MN
Mississippi	9	19,384	10.09	-	5,043	2.62	-	167,538	87.17	9	225	0.12	-	-	-	-	-	-	-	-148,154	-77.09	192,190	MS
Missouri	15	917,315	58.11	15	655,039	41.49	-	42	0.00	-	3,998	0.25	-	2,222	0.14	-	12	0.00	-	262,276	16.61	1,578,628	MO
Montana	4	119,071	53.09	4	96,770	43.15	-	-	-	-	7,313	3.26	-	695	0.31	-	429	0.19	-	22,301	9.94	224,278	MT
Nebraska	6	224,165	45.85	-	264,774	54.15	6	-	-	-	-	-	-	-	-	-	1	0.00	-	-40,609	-8.31	488,940	NE
Nevada	3	31,291	50.37	3	29,357	47.26	-	-	-	-	1,469	2.36	-	-	-	-	-	-	-	1,934	3.11	62,117	NV
New Hampshire	4	107,995	46.66	-	121,299	52.41	4	7	0.00	-	1,970	0.85	-	86	0.04	-	83	0.04	-	-13,304	-5.75	231,440	NH
New Jersey	16	895,455	45.93	-	981,124	50.33	16	-	-	-	42,683	2.19	-	10,521	0.54	-	19,772	1.01	-	-85,669	-4.39	1,949,555	NJ
New Mexico	4	105,464	56.38	4	80,303	42.93	-	-	-	-	1,037	0.55	-	83	0.04	-	176	0.09	-	25,161	13.45	187,063	NM
New York	47	2,780,204	45.01	-	2,841,163	45.99	47	-	-	-	509,559	8.25	-	40,879	0.66	-	5,532	0.09	-	-60,959	-0.98	6,177,337	NY
North Carolina	14	459,070	58.02	14	258,572	32.68	-	69,652	8.80	-	3,915	0.49	-	-	-	-	-	-	-	200,498	25.34	791,209	NC
North Dakota	4	95,812	43.41	-	115,139	52.17	4	374	0.17	-	8,391	3.80	-	1,000	0.45	-	-	-	-	-19,327	-8.76	220,716	ND
Ohio	25	1,452,791	49.48	25	1,445,684	49.24	-	-	-	-	37,596	1.28	-	-	-	-	-	-	-	7,107	0.24	2,936,071	OH
Oklahoma	10	452,782	62.75	10	268,817	37.25	-	-	-	-	-	-	-	-	-	-	-	-	-	183,965	25.49	721,599	OK
Oregon	6	243,147	46.40	-	260,904	49.78	6	-	-	-	14,978	2.86	-	5,051	0.96	-	-	-	-	-17,757	-3.39	524,080	OR
Pennsylvania	35	1,752,426	46.92	-	1,902,197	50.93	35	-	-	-	55,161	1.48	-	11,325	0.30	-	14,039	0.38	-	-149,771	-4.01	3,735,148	PA
Rhode Island	4	188,736	57.59	4	135,787	41.44	-	-	-	-	2,619	0.80	-	429	0.13	-	131	0.04	-	52,949	16.16	327,702	RI
South Carolina	8	34,423	24.14	-	5,386	3.78	-	102,607	71.97	8	154	0.11	-	1	0.00	-	-	-	-	-68,184	-47.82	142,571	SC
South Dakota	4	117,653	47.04	-	129,651	51.84	4	-	-	-	2,801	1.12	-	-	-	-	-	-	-	-11,998	-4.80	250,105	SD
Tennessee	12	270,402	49.14	11	202,914	36.87	-	73,815	13.41	1	1,864	0.34	-	1,288	0.23	-	-	-	-	67,488	12.26	550,283	TN
Texas	23	824,235	65.96	23	303,467	24.29	-	113,776	9.11	-	3,920	0.31	-	919	0.07	-	3,260	0.26	-	520,768	41.68	1,249,577	TX
Utah	4	149,151	53.98	4	124,402	45.02	-	-	-	-	2,679	0.97	-	-	-	-	73	0.03	-	24,749	8.96	276,305	UT
Vermont	3	45,557	36.92	-	75,926	61.54	3	-	-	-	1,279	1.04	-	585	0.47	-	35	0.03	-	-30,369	-24.61	123,382	VT
Virginia	11	200,786	47.89	11	172,070	41.04	-	43,393	10.35	-	2,047	0.49	-	726	0.17	-	234	0.06	-	28,716	6.85	419,256	VA
Washington	8	475,165	52.56	8	386,315	42.73	-	-	-	-	31,692	3.51	-	3,534	0.39	-	7,353	0.81	-	88,851	9.83	904,058	WA
West Virginia	8	429,188	57.32	8	316,251	42.24	-	-	-	-	3,311	0.44	-	-	-	-	-	-	-	112,937	15.08	748,750	WV
Wisconsin	12	647,310	50.70	12	590,959	46.28	-	-	-	-	25,282	1.98	-	12,547	0.98	-	702	0.05	-	56,351	4.41	1,276,800	WI
Wyoming	3	52,354	51.62	3	47,947	47.27	-	-	-	-	931	0.92	-	137	0.14	-	56	0.06	-	4,407	4.35	101,425	WY
TOTALS:	531	24,178,347	49.55	303	21,991,292	45.07	189	1,176,023	2.41	39	1,157,328	2.37	-	139,569	0.29	-	150,069	0.31	-	2,187,055	4.48	48,792,535	US

==== States that flipped from Republican to Democratic ====
- Colorado
- Iowa
- Ohio
- Wisconsin
- Wyoming

==== States that flipped from Democratic to Republican ====
- Connecticut
- Delaware
- Maryland
- Michigan
- New Jersey
- New Hampshire
- New York
- Oregon
- Pennsylvania

==== States that flipped from Democratic to Dixiecrat ====
- Alabama
- Louisiana
- Mississippi
- South Carolina

==== Close states ====
Margin of victory less than 1% (138 electoral votes):

1. Ohio, 0.24% (7,107 votes)
2. California, 0.44% (17,865 votes) (tipping point state for Truman victory)
3. Indiana, 0.80% (13,246 votes)
4. Illinois, 0.84% (33,612 votes) (tipping point state for Dewey victory)
5. New York, 0.98% (60,959 votes)

Margin of victory less than 5% (131 electoral votes):

1. Delaware, 1.28% (1,775 votes)
2. Maryland, 1.39% (8,293 votes)
3. Connecticut, 1.64% (14,457 votes)
4. Michigan, 1.67% (35,147 votes)
5. Iowa, 2.73% (28,362 votes)
6. Idaho, 2.73% (5,856 votes)
7. Nevada, 3.11% (1,934 votes)
8. Oregon, 3.39% (17,757 votes)
9. Pennsylvania, 4.01% (149,771 votes)
10. Wyoming, 4.35% (4,407 votes)
11. New Jersey, 4.39% (85,669 votes)
12. Wisconsin, 4.41% (56,351 votes)
13. South Dakota, 4.80% (11,998 votes)

Margin of victory between 5% and 10% (59 electoral votes):

1. Colorado, 5.35% (27,574 votes)
2. New Hampshire, 5.75% (13,304 votes)
3. Virginia, 6.85% (28,716 votes)
4. Nebraska, 8.31% (40,609 votes)
5. North Dakota, 8.76% (19,327 votes)
6. Utah, 8.96% (24,749 votes)
7. Kansas, 9.02% (71,137 votes)
8. Washington, 9.93% (89,850 votes)
9. Montana, 9.94% (22,301 votes)
10. Arizona, 9.97% (17,654 votes)

==== Statistics ====
Counties with highest percent of vote (Democratic)

1. Duval County, Texas 96.52%
2. Greene County, North Carolina 96.45%
3. King County, Texas 95.85%
4. Bertie County, North Carolina 95.71%
5. Martin County, North Carolina 95.53%

Counties with highest percent of vHighest Percent of Vote (Republican)

1. Jackson County, Kentucky 86.31%
2. Sevier County, Tennessee 84.11%
3. Johnson County, Tennessee 82.98%
4. Grant County, West Virginia 80.83%
5. Lincoln County, Maine 80.47%

Counties with highest percent of vote (Dixiecrat)

1. Choctaw County, Alabama 98.83%
2. Wilcox County, Alabama 98.81%
3. Bullock County, Alabama 98.76%
4. Edgefield County, South Carolina 98.20%
5. Monroe County, Alabama 97.86%

==== Results in major cities (from the top 100 by the 1940 census) ====
City	ST	Truman		Dewey		Thurmond		Wallace		Others		Totals
Los Angeles	CA	381,336	52.0%	300,988	41.0%	311	0.0%	46,385	6.3%	4,917	0.7%	733,937
San Francisco	CA	167,726	47.8%	160,135	45.7%	0	0.0%	21,492	6.1%	1,356	0.4%	350,709
Denver	CO	89,489	52.9%	76,364	45.2%	0	0.0%	2,420	1.4%	794	0.5%	169,067
Bridgeport	CT	34,418	52.9%	27,534	42.3%	0	0.0%	1,529	2.3%	1,601	2.5%	65,082
Hartford	CT	47,584	63.9%	24,653	33.1%	0	0.0%	1,687	2.3%	490	0.7%	74,414
New Haven	CT	43,068	55.9%	31,032	40.3%	0	0.0%	1,814	2.4%	1,072	1.4%	77,004
Waterbury	CT	23,657	53.0%	19,768	44.3%	0	0.0%	727	1.6%	477	1.1%	44,629
Chicago	IL	N/A	62.0%	N/A	37.2%	N/A	0.0%	N/A	0.0%	N/A	0.8%	1,684,424
Boston	MA	235,493	67.1%	94,163	26.8%	0	0.0%	10,423	3.0%	11,053	3.1%	351,132
Cambridge	MA	33,501	62.6%	17,149	32.1%	0	0.0%	1,388	2.6%	1,463	2.7%	53,501
Fall River	MA	38,347	71.4%	13,915	25.9%	0	0.0%	458	0.9%	1,015	1.9%	53,735
Lowell	MA	30,633	63.7%	15,677	32.6%	0	0.0%	511	1.1%	1,277	2.7%	48,098
Lynn	MA	27,954	57.8%	17,753	36.7%	0	0.0%	1,173	2.4%	1,514	3.1%	48,394
New Bedford	MA	34,186	65.8%	15,681	30.2%	0	0.0%	914	1.8%	1,171	2.3%	51,952
Somerville	MA	30,959	64.1%	15,466	32.0%	0	0.0%	744	1.5%	1,115	2.3%	48,284
Springfield	MA	38,548	51.9%	32,533	43.8%	0	0.0%	1,415	1.9%	1,801	2.4%	74,297
Worcester	MA	51,366	54.4%	38,373	40.6%	0	0.0%	2,028	2.1%	2,694	2.9%	94,461
Baltimore	MD	134,615	52.7%	110,879	43.4%	1,598	0.6%	7,257	2.8%	1,014	0.4%	255,363
Detroit	MI	N/A	63.9%	N/A	31.8%	N/A	0.0%	N/A	3.7%	N/A	0.6%	753,129
St. Louis	MO	220,654	64.2%	120,656	35.1%	0	0.0%	1,638	0.5%	822	0.2%	343,770
New York City	NY	1,596,545	50.6%	1,108,288	35.1%	0	0.0%	422,355	13.4%	29,931	0.9%	3,157,119
Philadelphia	PA	432,699	48.9%	425,962	48.1%	0	0.0%	20,745	2.3%	5,891	0.7%	885,297
Norfolk	VA	9,370	50.8%	7,556	40.9%	1,255	6.8%	259	1.4%	20	0.1%	18,460
Richmond	VA	16,466	46.6%	14,549	41.2%	3,892	11.0%	307	0.9%	87	0.2%	35,301

== Faithless elector controversy ==
Preston Parks, a member of the Tennessee Democratic Party, was selected as an elector for the Democratic ticket of Harry S. Truman and Alben W. Barkley. Electors are responsible for casting their votes on behalf of their state in the presidential and vice-presidential elections, with each state receiving a number of electors equal to its congressional delegation. To ensure impartiality, electors cannot be current U.S. senators or representatives, and they are often party members who are not running for office themselves, as was the case with Parks.

But Parks campaigned vigorously for the Dixiecrats, a faction of segregationist Southern Democrats led by Strom Thurmond and Fielding L. Wright. The Dixiecrats opposed Truman's civil rights platform and advocated for the preservation of racial segregation.

Despite being selected as a Democratic elector, Parks cast his vote for the Dixiecrat ticket, making him a "faithless elector" and sparking controversy. His defection, along with votes from other states that supported Thurmond—South Carolina, Mississippi, Alabama, and Louisiana—contributed to a total of 39 electoral votes for the Dixiecrat ticket.

== See also ==
- Party conventions:
  - 1948 Republican National Convention (Philadelphia: June 21–25, 1948)
  - 1948 Democratic National Convention (Philadelphia: July 12–14, 1948)
  - Dixiecrat National Convention (Birmingham: July 17, 1948)
  - 1948 Progressive National Convention (Philadelphia: July 23–25, 1948)
  - 1948 Communist National Convention (New York City: August 3–6, 1948)
  - 1947 Prohibition National Convention (Winona Lake, IN: June 26–28, 1947)
- History of the United States (1945–1964)
- 1948 United States House of Representatives elections
- 1948 United States Senate elections
- Second inauguration of Harry S. Truman
- 2016 United States presidential election
- Dewey Defeats Truman

== Works cited ==
- Abels, Jules. Out of the Jaws of Victory, New York: Henry Holt and Company (1959)
- Manchester, William. (1975). The Glory and the Dream: A Narrative History of America, 1932–1972, New York: Bantam Books. online
- Ross, Irwin. The Loneliest Campaign: The Truman Victory of 1948, New York: New American Library, 1968.
- Schmidt, Karl (1960). Henry A. Wallace: Quixotic Crusade 1948. Syracuse University Press. ISBN 978-0-8156-0020-6.
- Smith, Richard Norton (1984). Thomas E. Dewey and His Times. New York: Simon & Schuster. ISBN 0-671-41741-X.
