= List of keynote speakers at United States presidential nominating conventions =

United States presidential nominating conventions long have traditionally included a keynote speech, typically delivered on the opening day of the convention.

A 2000 report by the Congressional Research Service observed,

The keynote address sets the themes and tone of the convention and often of the general election campaign to follow. Keynote speakers are usually prominent office holders or party officials, chosen because of their national appeal and speaking ability, or because they may be viewed as “rising stars” in the party.
The keynote address is highly partisan in tone and content. It extols the party record and the incumbent President, when the party holds the White House. It attacks the opposition candidates, policies, and record.

== List of keynote speakers at major party conventions ==
List of major party keynote speakers
Election	Democratic	Republican	Further reading	Cite
1884	—N/a	John R. Lynch (former rep. from Mississippi)	1884 RNC	
1896	John W. Daniel (senator from Virginia)	Charles W. Fairbanks (party organizer from Indiana)	1896 DNC; 1896 RNC	
1900	Charles S. Thomas (governor of Colorado)	Edward O. Wolcott (senator from Colorado)	1900 DNC; 1900 RNC	
1904	John Sharp Williams (House minority leader)	Elihu Root (secretary of war)	1904 DNC; 1904 RNC	
1908	Theodore Arlington Bell (rep. from California)	Julius C. Burrows (senator from Michigan)	1908 DNC; 1908 RNC	
1912	Alton B. Parker (chief judge of the New York Court of Appeals & 1904 Democratic presidential nominee)	Elihu Root (senator from New York; former secretary of war)	1912 DNC; 1912 RNC	
1916	Martin H. Glynn (former governor of New York)	Warren G. Harding (senator from Ohio)	1916 DNC; 1916 RNC	
1920	Homer Stille Cummings (chair of the Democratic National Committee & state attorney of Fairfield County, Connecticut)	Henry Cabot Lodge (senator from Massachusetts)	1920 DNC; 1920 RNC	
1924	Pat Harrison (senator from Mississippi)	Theodore E. Burton (rep. & former senator from Ohio)	1924 DNC; 1924 RNC	
1928	Claude G. Bowers (party stalwart from Indiana)	Simeon D. Fess (senator from Ohio)	1928 DNC; 1928 RNC	
1932	Alben W. Barkley (senator from Kentucky)	L. J. Dickinson (senator from Iowa)	1932 DNC; 1932 RNC	
1936	Alben W. Barkley (senator from Kentucky); Joseph T. Robinson (senator from Arkansas)	Frederick Steiwer (senator from Oregon)	1936 DNC; 1936 RNC	
1940	William B. Bankhead (speaker of the House)	Harold Stassen (governor of Minnesota)	1940 DNC; 1940 RNC	
1944	Robert S. Kerr (governor of Oklahoma)	Earl Warren (governor of California)	1944 DNC; 1944 RNC	
1948	Alben W. Barkley (senator from Kentucky)	Dwight H. Green (governor of Illinois)	1948 DNC; 1948 RNC	
1952	Paul A. Dever (governor of Massachusetts)	Douglas MacArthur (former supreme commander for the Allied Powers)	1952 DNC; 1952 RNC	
1956	Frank G. Clement (governor of Tennessee) (Note: The keynote speech at the 1956 Democratic National Convention was preceded by a "keynote film" narrated by John F. Kennedy, senator from Massachusetts)	Arthur B. Langlie (governor of Washington)	1956 DNC; 1956 RNC	
1960	Frank Church (senator from Idaho)	Walter Judd (rep. from Minnesota)	1960 DNC; 1960 RNC	
1964	John Pastore (senator from Rhode Island & former governor of Rhode Island)	Mark Hatfield (governor of Oregon)	1964 DNC; 1964 RNC	
1968	Daniel Inouye (senator from Hawaii)	Daniel J. Evans (governor of Washington)	1968 DNC; 1968 RNC	
1972	Reubin Askew (governor of Florida)	Anne L. Armstrong (ambassador to Great Britain); Edward Brooke (senator from Massachusetts); Richard Lugar (mayor of Indianapolis)	1972 DNC; 1972 RNC	
1976	John Glenn (senator from Ohio); Barbara Jordan (rep. from Texas)	Howard Baker (senator from Tennessee)	1976 DNC; 1976 RNC	
1980	Mo Udall (rep. from Arizona)	Guy Vander Jagt (rep. from Michigan)	1980 DNC; 1980 RNC	
1984	Mario Cuomo (governor of New York)	Katherine D. Ortega (treasurer of the United States)	1984 DNC keynote 1984 RNC	
1988	Ann Richards (Texas state treasurer)	Thomas Kean (governor of New Jersey)	1988 DNC; 1988 RNC	
1992	Zell Miller (senator from Georgia); Barbara Jordan (former rep. from Texas); Bill Bradley (senator from New Jersey)	Phil Gramm (senator from Texas)	1992 DNC; 1992 RNC	
1996	Evan Bayh (governor of Indiana)	Susan Molinari (rep. from New York)	1996 DNC; 1996 RNC	
2000	Harold Ford Jr. (rep. from Tennessee)	John McCain (senator from Arizona & unsuccessful candidate for presidential nomination); Colin Powell (former chair of the Joint Chiefs of Staff)	2000 DNC; 2000 RNC	
2004	Barack Obama (Illinois state senator & senate nominee in Illinois)	Zell Miller (Democratic Party senator from Georgia)	2004 DNC keynote 2004 RNC	
2008	Mark Warner (former governor of Virginia & senate nominee in Virginia)	Rudy Giuliani (former mayor of New York & unsuccessful candidate for presidential nomination)	2008 DNC; 2008 RNC	
2012	Julian Castro (mayor of San Antonio)	Chris Christie (governor of New Jersey)	2012 DNC; 2012 RNC	
2016	Elizabeth Warren (senator from Massachusetts)	Joni Ernst (senator from Iowa)	2016 DNC; 2016 RNC	
2020	17 speakers (Note: 2020 Democratic keynote speech was jointly delivered by: Stacey Abrams (former minority leader of the Georgia House of Representatives and past nominee in the 2018 Georgia gubernatorial election); Raumesh Akbari (Tennessee state senator); Colin Allred (rep. from Texas); Brendan Boyle (rep. from Pennsylvania); Yvanna Cancela (Nevada state senator); Kathleen Clyde (Ohio state representatives); Nikki Fried (Florida commissioner of agriculture); Robert Garcia (mayor of Long Beach, California); Malcolm Kenyatta (Pennsylvania state representative); Conor Lamb (rep. from Pennsylvania); Mari Manoogian (Michigan state representative); Victoria Neave (Texas state representative); Jonathan Nez (president of the Navajo Nation); Sam Park (Georgia state representative); Dennis Ruprecht (New Hampshire state representative); Randall Woodfin (mayor of Birmingham, Alabama))	—N/a	2020 DNC	
2024	Angela Alsobrooks (Prince George's County executive & senate nominee in Maryland)	—N/a	2024 DNC	

=== Historic firsts ===
- At the 1884 Republican National Convention, Lynch was the first African American to deliver a keynote address at a major party convention, and the only person of color to do so until 1968
- The 1952 keynotes were the first to be nationally televised live
- At the 1968 Democratic convention, Inouye was the first person of color to deliver a Democratic Party keynote speech, and the first to deliver one at either major party's convention since 1884
- At the 1972 Republican convention, Armstrong was the first woman to deliver a major party's convention keynote
- At the 1976 Democratic convention, Jordan was the first black person to deliver the Democratic Party keynote address
- At the 1976 Democratic convention, Jordan was the first woman to deliver the Democratic Party convention keynote speech
- At the 2000 Democratic convention, Ford was the first black man to deliver the Democratic convention keynote (Barbara Jordan, a black woman, had twice preceded him)
- At the 2012 Democratic convention, Castro was the first Hispanic person to deliver the Democratic convention keynote
- At the 2020 Democratic convention, Garcia, Kenyatta, and Park became the first openly LGBTQ speakers to deliver a keynote address at a Democratic National Convention (all three being openly-gay men). Park was also the first Korean-American to deliver a major party keynote address

== Examples of keynote speakers at third party conventions ==
Examples of third party convention keynote speakers include:

=== Progressive Party (1910s) ===
- Raymond Robins (economist) at 1916 Progressive National Convention

=== Progressive Party (1940s and 1950s) ===
- Charles P. Howard Sr. (an African American editor) at 1948 Progressive National Convention
- W. E. B. Du Bois (civil rights activist) at 1952 Progressive National Convention

=== Communist Party ===
- Earl Browder (Communist Party USA general secretary) at 1944 Communist National Convention
- William Z. Foster (Communist Party USA general secretary) at the 1948 Communist National Convention

=== Populist Party ===
- Marion Butler (senator from North Carolina & North Carolina state senator) at the 1892 Populist National Convention and 1896 Populist National Convention

=== Prohibition Party ===
- Clinton N. Howard at the 1912 and 1932 Prohibition National Conventions
- Aaron S. Watkins (1908 & 1912 vice presidential nominee and 1920 presidential nominee of Prohibition Party) at 1920 Prohibition National Convention
- D. Leigh Colvin (1920 Vice presidential and 1936 presidential nominee of the Prohibition Party) at the 1936 Prohibition National Convention and 1943 Prohibition National Convention
- Claude A. Watson (attorney) at 1940 Prohibition National Convention
- Edward E. Blake (chairman of the national committee of the Prohibition Party) at the 1947 Prohibition National Convention
- William Langer (Republican Party senator from North Dakota) at the 1955 Prohibition National Convention

=== Other ===
- William Randolph Hearst (newspaper publisher and former rep. from New York) at the 1908 Independence National Convention

== See also ==
- Speeches by spouses of nominees at United States presidential nominating conventions
