= The Level Club =

Residential building in New York City

- Level Club
- U.S. National Register of Historic Places
- New York State Register of Historic Places
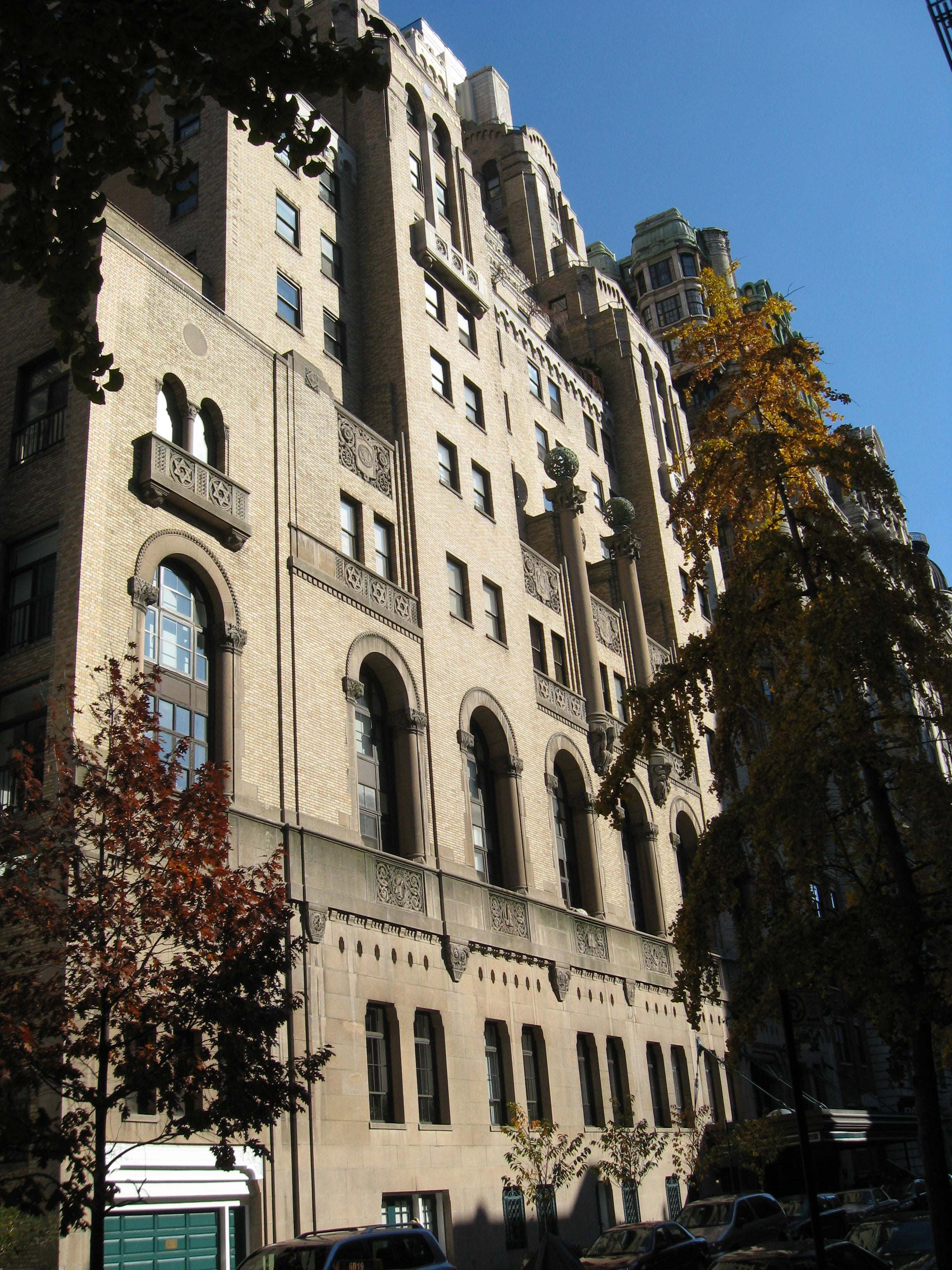
- The Level Club, November 2008

- Location within New York City Location within New York Location within the United States
- Location: 253 W. 73rd St., New York, New York
- Coordinates: 40°46′49″N 73°59′0″W
- Area: 0.3 acres (0.12 ha)
- Built: 1925
- Architectural style: Romanesque
- NRHP reference No.: 84002784
- NYSRHP No.: 06101.001709

Significant dates
- Added to NRHP: April 9, 1984
- Designated NYSRHP: February 10, 1984

The Level Club is a residential building at 253 West 73rd Street on the Upper West Side of Manhattan in New York City. It was built as a men's club by a group of Freemasons in 1927; it served this original function for just about three years. Afterwards, the building was used, in turn, as a hotel and a drug re-hab center. It has now been remodeled as a condominium.

== History ==
The building was erected in 1927.

The bank foreclosed on the club's mortgage in 1931. It became a hotel for men that rented rooms by the week in the 1930s, and a kosher hotel in the 1940s and 1950s, and a single-room-occupancy hotel in the 1960s. From 1936, it was known as The Hotel Riverside Plaza. At the height of the urban decay of the 1970s it was purchased by the nonprofit drug and alcohol rehabilitation organization Phoenix House. It was turned into an upscale condominium in 1984. The New York Daily News describes it as the city's "most mystical and intriguing condominium." The Capitol Records artist Stan Kenton recorded the album Cuban Fire in this building in 1956 .

== Architecture ==
The Neo-Romanesque building was designed by the New York architectural firm Clinton Russell Wells George and Holton.

The facade was designed as an homage to Freemasonry, particularly by incorporating aspects of biblical descriptions of the Temple of Solomon, a significant building in Masonic tradition. The facade also features many carvings of symbols adopted by the Masons, such as the all-seeing eye, the hourglass, the level, the hexagram, the beehive and the Bible. The door is framed by two large pillars representing Boaz and Jachin, the pillars that stood at the entrance to King Solomon's Temple. The figures at the base of the pillars represent two figures of Masonic significance Hiram Abiff and King Solomon. According to Bruno Bertuccioli, author of The Level Club: A New York City Story of the Twenties: Splendor, Decadence and Resurgence of a Monument to Human Ambition, the building was built as a Replica of the Jewish Temple. Bertuccioli describes the building as "the only true-to-size rendering of King Solomon's Temple that exists in the world today."

The building's original grand lobby, featuring a two-story atrium with balcony and grand staircases is intact. The building originally included "a swimming pool, bowling alley, 4,000-seat auditorium, dining halls, gymnasium, racquetball courts, a club floor, billiards room and rooftop gardens." It did not include lodge meeting rooms. While none of these survive, the facade is "perfectly preserved." The building was listed on the National Register of Historic Places in 1984.

== Books ==
- The Level Club: A New York City Story of the Twenties: Splendor, Decadence and Resurgence of a Monument to Human Ambition, by Bruno Bertuccioli and Andrea Bassan, 1991.
