= Blanton =

Blanton may refer to:

== People with the surname ==
- Aaron Blanton (born 1991), American producer/director
- Annie Webb Blanton (1870–1945), American educator, politician
- Brett Blanton (fl. 2020–2023), 12th Architect of the Capitol
- Carsie Blanton (born 1985), American singer-songwriter
- Elizabeth Blanton (born 1970), American astronomer
- Jack C.F. Blanton (1921–2002), American politician from Texas
- Joe Blanton (born 1980), American baseball pitcher
- John Blanton (born 1968), American politician from Kentucky
- Jimmy Blanton (1918–1942), American jazz double bassist
- Kendall Blanton (born 1995), American football player
- Kirby Bliss Blanton (born 1990), American actress.
- Ray Blanton (1930–1996), American politician from Tennessee
- Stone Blanton (born 2002), American football player
- Thomas L. Blanton (1872–1957), American politician from Texas
- Virginia Blanton (fl. 2008–2024), American professor
- Ward Blanton (fl. 2007–2016), British scholar
- William W. Blanton (1924–2014), American politician from Texas

== People with the given name ==
- Blanton Duncan (1827–1902), American landholder, printer, political organizer, and Confederate Army officer
- Blanton Winship (1869–1947), American military lawyer and veteran

== Places ==
- Blanton, Georgia
- Blanton, Oklahoma
- Blanton Museum of Art

== See also ==
- Blanton's
- Blanton v. City of North Las Vegas
