= Jack Blanton =

Jack Blanton may refer to:

- Jack S. Blanton (1927–2013), American oil industry executive, civic leader and philanthropist
- Jack C.F. Blanton (1921–2002), American politician, businessman, and newspaper editor
