= Liberal Republican Party (United States) =

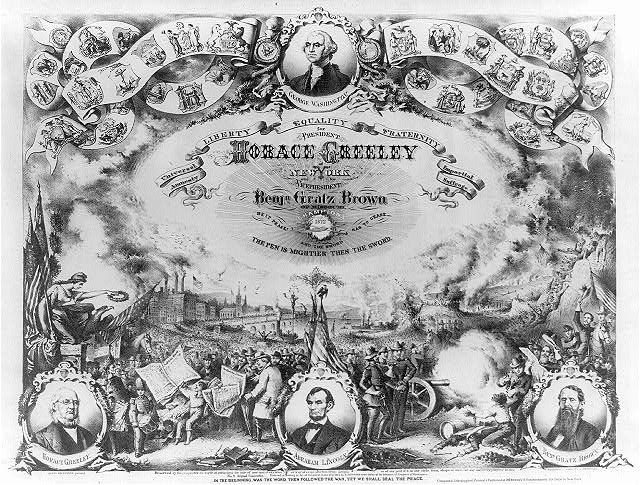
- Liberal Republican campaign poster
- Historical leaders: Carl Schurz; Lyman Trumbull; Horace Greeley
- Founded: 1870; 156 years ago
- Dissolved: 1872; 154 years ago
- Split from: Republican Party: Moderate faction
- Merged into: Republican Party: Moderate faction; Democratic Party
- Succeeded by: Half-Breed faction of the Republican Party; Mugwump faction of the Republican Party; Democratic Party
- Ideology: Anti-Grantism; Anti-Reconstruction; Classical liberalism; Economic liberalism
- National affiliation: Democratic Party (1872)

The Liberal Republican Party was an American political party that was organized in May 1872 to oppose the reelection of President Ulysses S. Grant and his Radical Republican supporters in the presidential election of 1872. The party emerged in Missouri under the leadership of Senator Carl Schurz and soon attracted other opponents of Grant; the Liberal Republicans decried the scandals of the Grant administration and sought civil service reform. The party opposed Grant's Reconstruction policies, particularly the Enforcement Acts. It lost in a landslide, and disappeared from the national stage after the 1872 election.

The Republican Party had emerged as the dominant party in the aftermath of the Civil War, but many original Republicans became dissatisfied with the leadership of President Grant. Prominent liberal leaders like Schurz and Lyman Trumbull had been leaders in the fight against slavery and for the first stages of Reconstruction. They considered the task accomplished, and thought continued radical policies to be oppressive. By 1872, they demanded an end to Reconstruction and a restoration of self-government to the South.

The 1872 Liberal Republican convention nominated a ticket consisting of Horace Greeley, longtime publisher of the New-York Tribune, and Missouri Governor Benjamin Gratz Brown. Seeking to defeat Grant, the Democratic Party nominated the Liberal Republican ticket and endorsed the Liberal Republican platform. However, Grant emerged triumphant in the election, capitalizing on superior party organization. Democrats lacked enthusiasm for Greeley, who for decades had denounced them. Greeley received 44% of the popular vote, winning the states of Texas, Missouri, Kentucky, Tennessee, Georgia and Maryland. Grant received 286 of the 352 electoral college votes. Greeley died shortly after the election.

The Liberal Republican Party vanished immediately after the election, though a handful of its leaders continued to serve in Congress. Former party members scattered into the Democratic and Republican parties.

== History of the party ==
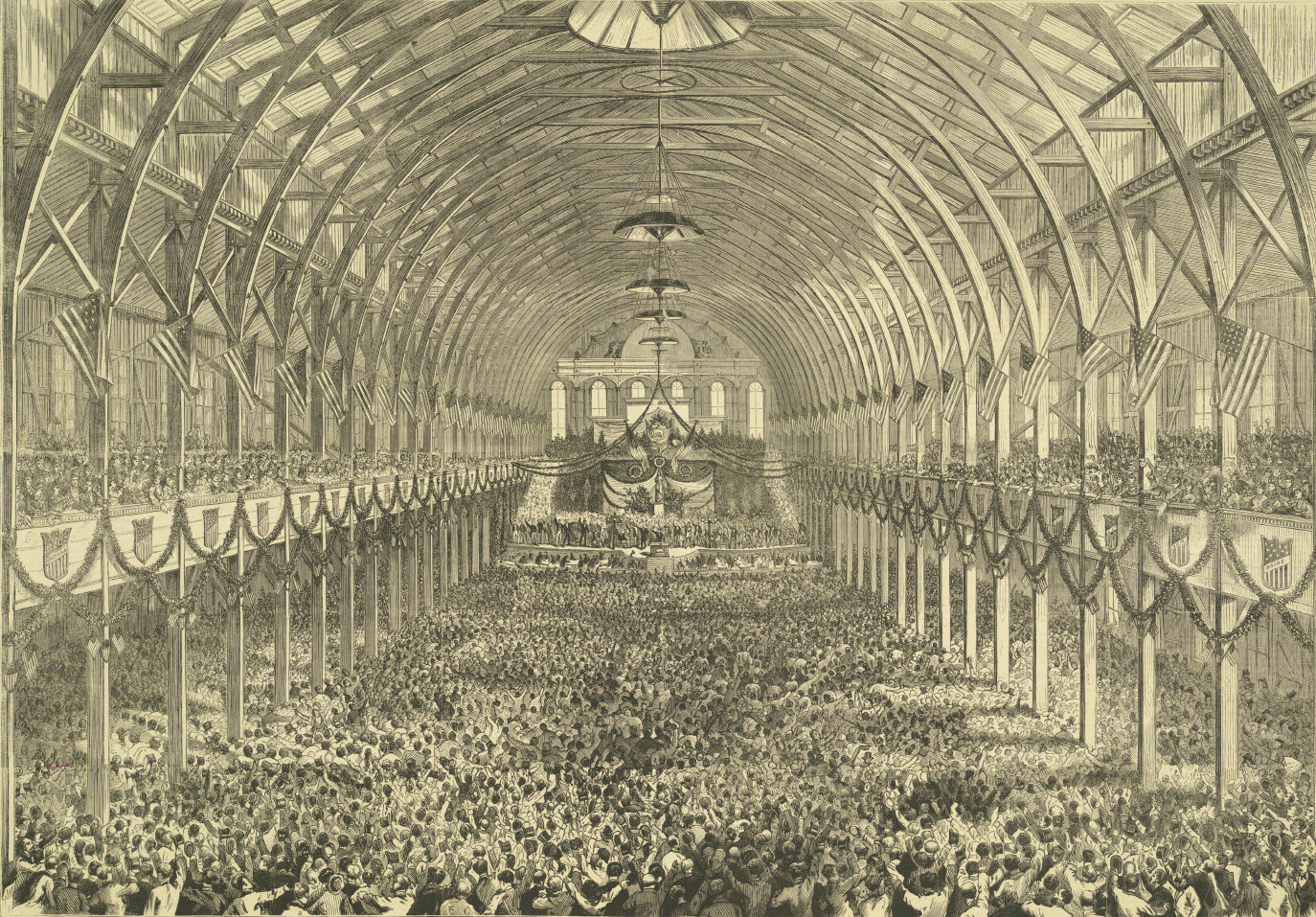
Interior of the convention hall during the announcement of Horace Greeley as the party's nominee for president in 1872

=== Formation ===
Originally, liberal Republicans advocated for a return to traditional classical republicanism, were concerned about corruption and centralized power creeping into the federal government, and wanted to reform the Republican Party. As the liberal Republicans began to form a political party, a few years later, it was taken over by others who were anti-Grant and anti-reconstruction. The party began in Missouri in 1870 under the leadership of Carl Schurz and spread nationwide. It had strong support from powerful Republican newspaper editors such as Murat Halstead of the Cincinnati Commercial, Horace White of the Chicago Tribune, Henry Watterson of the Louisville Courier-Journal, Samuel Bowles of the Springfield Republican and especially Whitelaw Reid and Horace Greeley of the New-York Tribune. Many Liberal Republican leaders had been Democrats and members of the Free Soil Party before joining the Republican Party after its creation in the 1850s.

The Liberal Republicans thought that the Grant administration and the President personally were fully corrupt. More importantly, they thought that the goals of Reconstruction had been achieved. These goals were firstly the destruction of slavery, and secondly the destruction of Confederate nationalism. With these goals achieved the tenets of republicanism demanded that federal military troops be removed from the South, where they were propping up allegedly corrupt Republican regimes. Many of the original founders of the Republican party and leaders of the Civil War joined the movement, including its nominee Horace Greeley, Charles Sumner of Massachusetts, Lyman Trumbull of Illinois, Cassius Marcellus Clay of Kentucky and Charles Francis Adams of Massachusetts. The party platform demanded "the immediate and absolute removal of all disabilities imposed on account of the rebellion" and local self-government for the southern states. It regarded "a thorough reform of the civil service as one of the most pressing necessities of the hour". Many Liberal Republicans also sought a downward revision of the tariff, believing that powerful industries had unfairly won the protection of certain goods.

The Liberal Republicans argued that the goal of ensuring civil and political rights for African Americans had been achieved. Hence, they contended it was time for "amnesty", which meant restoring to ex-Confederates the right to vote and hold office. A key motivation for many Liberal Republicans was a belief in states' rights and a fear of a strong federal government. Many Liberal Republicans had joined the Republican Party in the 1850s in opposition to the expansion of slavery into the territories, but with slavery no longer an issue and the Civil War over, other issues such as federal power re-emerged. Many of the Liberal Republicans, including Trumbull, had opposed the impeachment of Andrew Johnson and were wary of an upset of the traditional constitutional balance of power. According to historian Eric Foner, all four of the remaining Republican senators who voted to acquit President Johnson had joined the Liberal Republican Party in 1872.

=== 1872 convention ===
Led by Schurz, judge Stanley Matthews and editor William Grosvenor, the Liberal Republican Party organized a national convention in Cincinnati in May 1872. In Missouri, Democrats and Liberal Republicans had successfully defeated the incumbent Republican governor and the Liberal Republicans hoped to nominate a presidential candidate who could likewise win the support of Democrats. Though Schurz had founded the party, he was ineligible to run for president as he had been born in Germany and instead became the chairman of the convention. Those who attended the convention had various motivations, though all were united in opposition to Grant. Many delegates were attracted to the party's support for civil service reform and an end to Reconstruction. Others like Reuben Fenton hoped to recapture control of state party organizations. In Missouri, the Liberal Republicans had become established as a major party, but the other states lacked a party organization and their delegations were little more than self-appointed committees.

Entering the convention, Supreme Court Justice David Davis, Senator Lyman Trumbull of Illinois and former Congressman Charles Francis Adams of Massachusetts were among the major candidates for the presidential nomination Schurz favored Adams, but was unwilling to publicly back a candidate as he wished to retain the appearance of impartiality. Davis entered the week of the convention with perhaps the strongest backing, but saw his candidacy damaged by unfavorable coverage from newspapers aligned with the Liberal Republican movement. Newspaper publisher Horace Greeley of New York won the support of many former Davis backers, despite some concern about his lack of support for tariff reduction.

On the first ballot of the convention, Adams and Greeley emerged as the two strongest contenders for the nomination. Most delegates voted for Adams or Greeley on subsequent ballots, though Trumbull retained significant support. On the sixth and final ballot, Greeley picked up just enough to clinch the nomination. Following the presidential nomination, the convention chose Missouri Governor Benjamin Gratz Brown as the party's vice presidential nominee. Brown had supported Greeley's nomination as a way to increase his power within the state party at the expense of Schurz, and Brown won the support of most pro-Greeley delegates on the vice presidential ballot.

=== 1872 campaign ===
Prior to the Liberal Republican convention, Democratic leaders had given the Liberal Republicans assurances that they would nominate the Liberal Republican ticket. The Democrats believed that they could not win the 1872 election without anti-Grant Republicans and Democratic leaders hoped that they would reap patronage rewards from a Liberal Republican presidency. However, Democratic leaders were dismayed by the nomination of Greeley. Many Southern Democrats were eager to elect any candidate that might put an end to Grant's Reconstruction policies, but Greeley's frequent attacks on the Democratic Party had earned the enmity of many Democrats, especially in the Northeast. Despite these qualms, most Democrats decided that Greeley was better than Grant and represented their only chance to defeat the Republican president. Though several state conventions endured considerable debate, every state Democratic convention other than Delaware's convention ultimately endorsed Greeley. By a wide margin, the July 1872 Democratic National Convention voted to endorse the Liberal Republican ticket and accept the party's platform without modification. After the convention, a group of disaffected Democrats led by Blanton Duncan nominated Charles O'Conor and John Quincy Adams II on the Straight-Out Democratic Party ticket, but both refused the nomination and neither actively campaigned.

The Liberal Republican Party fused with the Democratic Party in all states except for Louisiana and Texas. In states where Republicans were stronger, the Liberal Republicans fielded a majority of the joint slate of candidates for lower offices; while in states where Democrats were stronger, the Democrats fielded the most candidates. In many states, such as Ohio, each party nominated half of a joint slate of candidates. Even initially reluctant Democratic leaders like Thomas F. Bayard came to support Greeley.

The 1872 campaign was primarily conducted on personalities rather than issues, with Greeley and Grant both sustaining numerous personal attacks. Greeley favored protectionism and did not emphasize civil service reform, two of the motivating issues for the party's founders. Greeley attacked many of Grant's many appointments as corrupt, but Greeley's past associations with Republican leaders undermined the corruption argument. Nonetheless, Liberal Republican leaders like Schurz and Sumner coalesced behind Greeley and most actively campaigned for the party's nominee. Grant's backers accused the Liberal Republicans of seeking to overturn the results of the Civil War and the Republicans mobilized veteran's organizations in support of Grant. Liberal Republicans argued that they sought reconciliation of North and South and that the time had come to end radical Reconstruction policies. Each party sought to appeal to African Americans, with the Liberal Republican appeal centering on Greeley's long history of abolitionism. However, Frederick Douglass successfully organized blacks in support of Grant. Many inside and outside of the Liberal Republican Party believed that their coalition would triumph in the 1872 election and the outcome of the election remained in doubt until October. However, the Republicans utilized superior organization, the backing of financiers like Jay Cooke and lingering Democratic doubts about Greeley to win most contests throughout the country.

Foner writes that in spite of Greeley's personal record of advocating civil rights, blacks held a sharp distrust due to his association in the election cycle with the Democratic Party, and furthermore recognized that civil service reform would inhibit their social and economic progress by effectively barring "the whole colored population" from public office.

In the election, Greeley won 43.8% of the popular vote and just 66 of the 352 electoral votes, while O'Conor won 0.3% of the popular vote. Greeley died on November 29, 1872, before the presidential electors met on December 4 to cast the electoral votes. The Greeley electors were not able to coordinate their votes before meeting, but their action made no difference in the face of Grant's electoral college landslide. (Note: Most Greeley electors (42 of 66) voted for Thomas A. Hendricks for President. Greeley electors who were Liberal Republicans cast 18 electoral votes for B. Gratz Brown (8 in Missouri, 6 in Georgia, and 4 in Kentucky). Two Greeley electors voted for Charles Jenkins, one for David Davis, and three electors (in Georgia) voted for Greeley, even though he had died. Congress refused to count the three electoral votes cast for Greeley.)

=== Aftermath ===
Although the Liberal Republican Party did not survive Greeley's death, several of its reforms materialized in the following decade. Reform Republicans accomplished the nomination and then election of Rutherford B. Hayes in 1876, who brought Reconstruction to an end and removed some of Grant's appointments. The Liberal Republican call for civil service reform was passed during the administration of President Chester Arthur. However, Greeley's relatively poor performance (he fared worse than Horatio Seymour had in 1868) also put an end to the Democratic experiment with fusion tickets.

Though the national party organization disappeared, several Liberal Republican members continued to serve in Congress after the 1872 elections. While those in the House were allowed to keep their committee assignments and chairmanships, Liberal Republican Senators became de facto independents and received inferior committee assignments. Most Liberal Republican Congressmen eventually joined the Democratic Party. Outside of the South, some Liberal Republicans sought the creation of a new party opposed to Republicans, but Democrats were unwilling to abandon their old party affiliation and even relatively successful efforts like Wisconsin's Reform Party collapsed. Even the Missouri Liberal Republican Party collapsed as the Democrats became the major opposition party to the Republicans.

Democrats won several seats in Congress and numerous other offices in the 1874 elections, aided by dissatisfaction with Grant and the defection of former Liberal Republicans. As Republicans became increasingly worried about their chances in the 1876 elections, they courted former Liberal Republican leaders like Schurz and Fenton. Both parties made direct appeals to former Liberal Republicans in the 1876 elections and former party supporters split roughly evenly between the two presidential candidates. Schurz actively campaigned for Hayes and became the Secretary of Interior after Hayes won the election. In the following years, former Liberal Republicans became members in good standing of both major parties. In the 1880s, many would join the Mugwump movement in opposition to James G. Blaine. Many also joined the Greenback Party, which sought inflationary policies and labor reforms.

== Interpretations ==
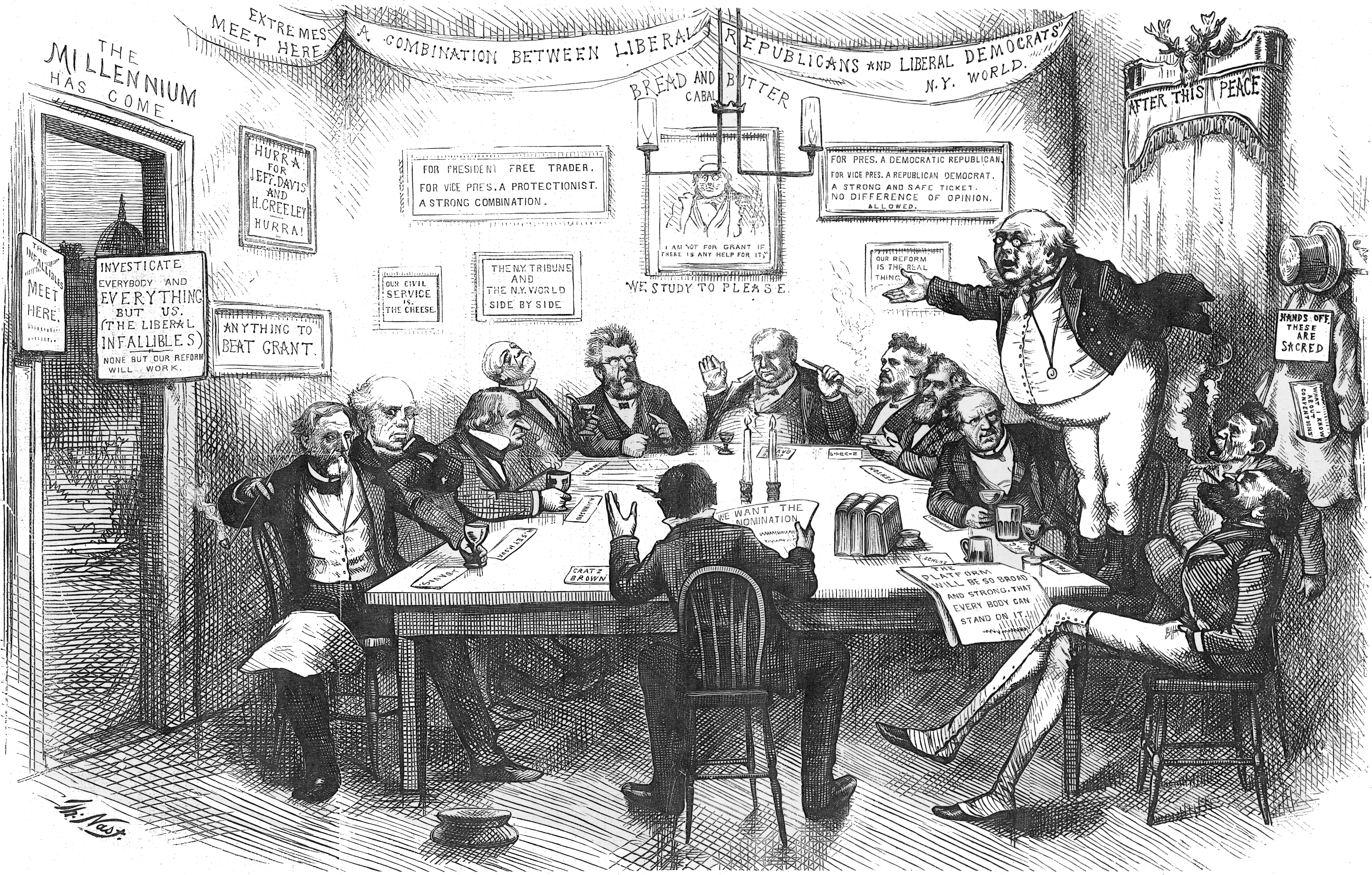
Thomas Nast's caricature of the Cincinnati Convention from Harper's Weekly, April 13, 1872

Historian Richard Gerber argues that most authors and historians portray the Liberal Republicans as an aberration, noting the many unresolved issues of the Reconstruction Era. He groups the historical interpretations of the party that prevailed after 1872 into two main categories. One historical interpretation emphasizes the Liberal Republican push for the re-establishment of self-government in the South and the restoration of national unity. The second interpretation sees the Liberal Republicans as primarily motivated by opposition to the corruption of the Grant administration and support for lower tariffs.

Downey argues Greeley was nominated as a result of a crass political bargain imposed against the will of a convention that really wanted Charles Francis Adams. Men like Schurz supported Adams, but were inexperienced political idealists and not professional politicians. They neither acted nor voted as a bloc, particularly after the collapse of a boom for David Davis, a collapse engineered by a group of leading reformist Republican editors. The shift of particular votes to Greeley was not decisive, but the feeling of the delegates that Adams could not win support among Irish workers, the Western masses, or Democratic voters.

Lunde argues Grant supporters hailed the Civil War as a great triumph which had bound the United States into a united nation, linked not only by sentiment but by rapidly increasing networks of railroads. The Democrats and their Liberal Republican allies thought the war was a tragedy, recoiled against centralization and sought to recapture the purity of prewar days through reconciliation and respect for the autonomy of the states. Greeley's benevolent image of nationalism was defeated by the centralizing, "blood and iron" concept of Grant.

McPherson argues that three-quarters of ex abolitionists favored Grant, although such antislavery Republicans as Charles Francis Adams, Carl Schurz and Charles Sumner were key supporters of Greeley. Focused on the welfare of the freedmen, abolitionists were appalled by Greeley's formula for cooperation with "better class" southern whites by granting amnesty to all Confederates and adopting a hands-off policy toward the South. They supported Grant in the belief that his Southern policy promised the best protection for the African Americans. Most abolitionists believed that, moral suasion having failed earlier, true equality could be achieved only through relentless law enforcement.

Slap (2006) defends the reputation of the Liberal Republicans from allegations of opportunism (as presented by Ari Hoogenboom), of elitism (as presented by John G. Sproat) and racism as presented by the neoabolitionists. He joins Heather Cox Richardson and David Quigley in concluding that Reconstruction ended not because of politicized violence in the South, but because of the Northern decision that the war goals had been achieved and it would thwart republican ideals to continue Army rule of the South.

== Prominent party members ==
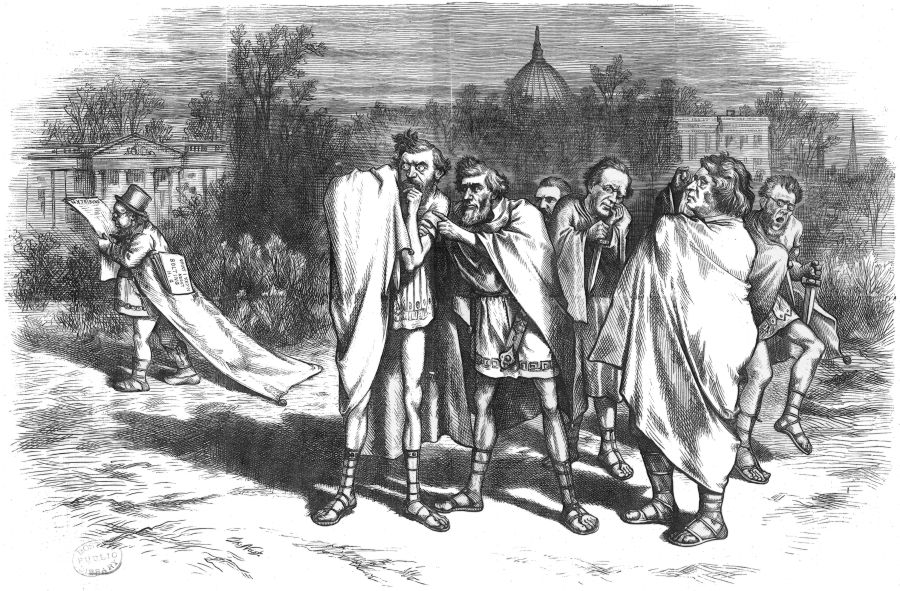
Liberal Republican "conspirators" in a political cartoon from Harper's Weekly of March 16, 1872

- Charles Francis Adams Sr., former congressman and ambassador, son of President John Quincy Adams.
- Nathaniel P. Banks, chairman of the House Committee on Foreign Affairs and former Speaker of the House.
- John Cochrane, Union General, New York Attorney General. As leader of the New York delegation to the Liberal Republican Convention at Cincinnati in 1872, he was instrumental in securing the nomination of Horace Greeley for the presidency.
- John Baxter, federal judge.
- B. Gratz Brown, a governor of Missouri and vice presidential candidate in the 1872 United States presidential election.
- Caspar Butz, "Forty-Eighter", Leader of the Radical Democracy Party (1864) and author of German-American literature.
- Salmon P. Chase, Chief Justice of the United States, former U.S. Senator from Ohio and treasury secretary.
- David Davis, U.S. Supreme Court justice, later senator from Illinois.
- Reuben Fenton, while U.S. Senator from New York
- Thomas W. Tipton, while U.S. Senator from Nebraska
- Jacob Dolson Cox, Secretary of the Interior under the Grant administration.
- John McAuley Palmer, Governor of Illinois from 1869 to 1873.
- Horace Greeley, newspaper editor, presidential candidate in the 1872 United States presidential election.
- George Washington Julian, congressman from Indiana and women's suffrage advocate.
- Alexander McClure, Pennsylvania state senator
- T.A.R. Nelson, congressman from Tennessee.
- Carl Schurz, former ambassador, Civil War general, power-broker and senator from Missouri.
- Charles Sumner, senator from Massachusetts and anti-slavery advocate.
- Lyman Trumbull, Illinois Senator and author of the Thirteenth Amendment to the United States Constitution, which officially outlawed slavery.
- Cassius M. Clay, ambassador, member of the Kentucky House of Representatives
- J. B. C. Drew, Union officer and Florida Attorney General

== See also ==
- 1872 United States presidential election
- American election campaigns in the 19th century
- Brooks-Baxter War
- History of the United States Republican Party
- Reconstruction
- Third Party System
