= 1872 Liberal Republican convention =

American political convention

1872 Liberal Republican National Convention
- 1872 presidential election
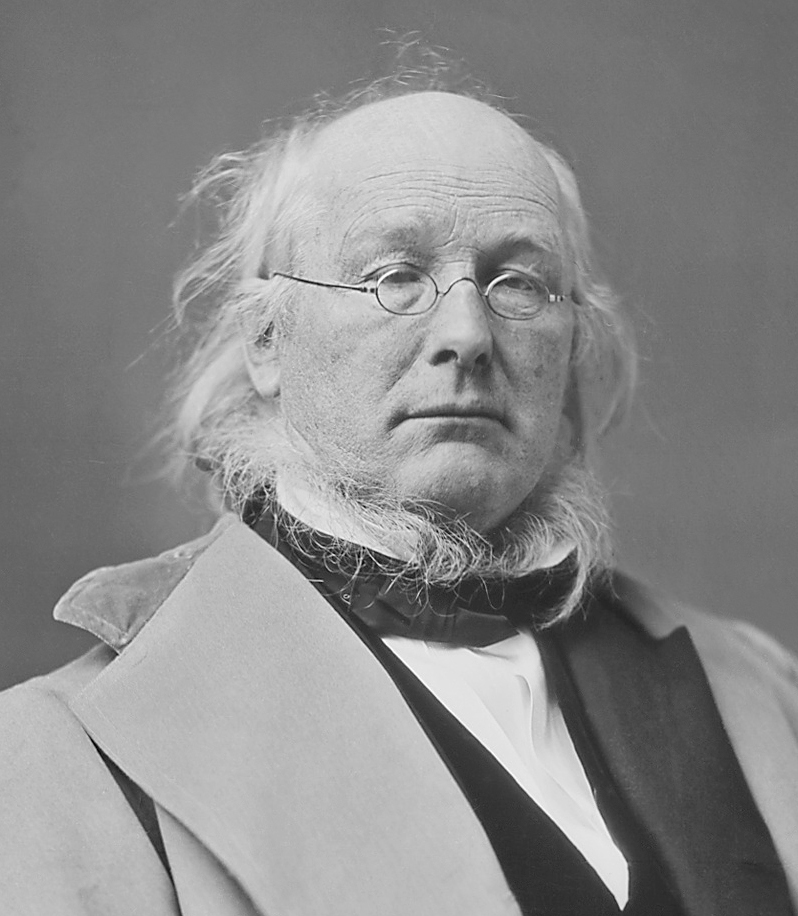
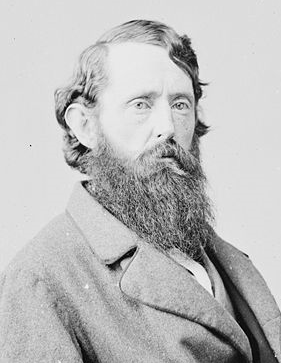
- Nominees; Greeley and Brown

Convention
- Dates: May 1–3, 1872
- City: Cincinnati, Ohio

Candidates
- Presidential nominee: Horace Greeley of New York
- Vice-presidential nominee: Benjamin Gratz Brown of Missouri

An influential group of dissident Republicans split from the party to form the Liberal Republican Party in 1870. At the party's only national convention, held in Cincinnati in 1872, New York Tribune editor Horace Greeley was nominated for president on the sixth ballot, defeating Charles Francis Adams. Missouri Governor Benjamin Gratz Brown was nominated for vice-president on the second ballot. They were also nominated at the 1872 Democratic National Convention two months later.

== Platform ==
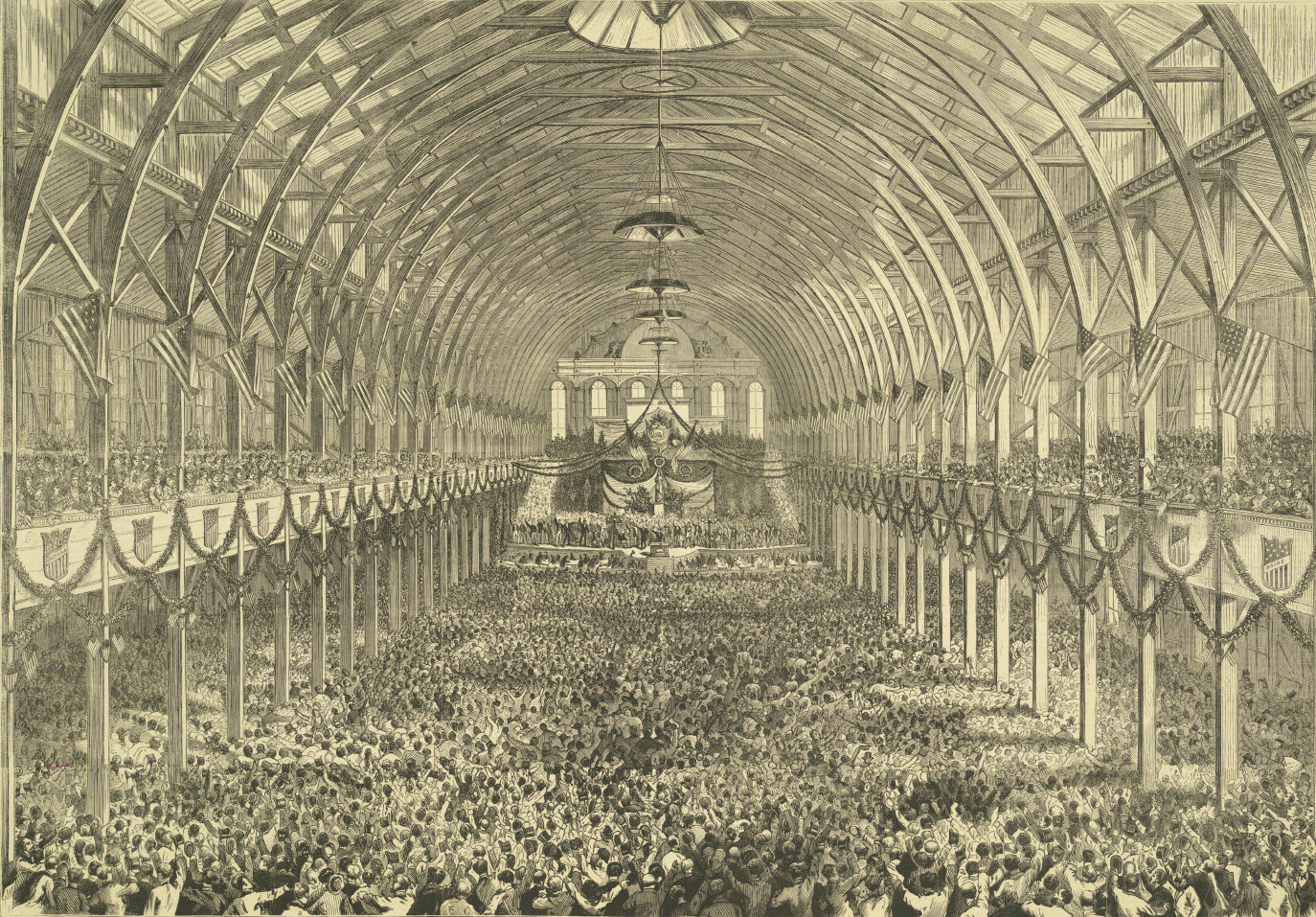
Illustration of the convention

The platform drawn up by the delegates was a sizzling indictment of Grant and his followers. The Liberal platform called for an end to the hatreds of the American Civil War and Reconstruction (sections 2 and 3), demanded civil service reform to curb corruption (section 5), and hedged on the tariff issue (section 6).

We, the Liberal Republicans of the United States in National Convention assembled at Cincinnati, proclaim the following principles as essential to just government.

First: We recognize the equality of all men before the law, and hold that it is the duty of Government in its dealings with the people to mete out equal and exact justice to all of whatever nativity, race, color, or persuasion, religious or political.

Second: We pledge ourselves to maintain the union of these States, emancipation, and enfranchisement, and to oppose any re-opening of the questions settled by the Thirteenth, Fourteenth, and Fifteenth Amendments to the Constitution.

Third: We demand the immediate and absolute removal of all disabilities imposed on account of the Rebellion, which was finally subdued seven years ago, believing that universal amnesty will result in complete pacification in all sections of the country.

Fourth: Local self-government, with impartial suffrage, will guard the rights of all citizens more securely than any centralized power. The public welfare requires the supremacy of the civil over the military authority, and freedom of person under the protection of the habeas corpus. We demand for the individual the largest liberty consistent with public order; for the State, self-government, and for the nation a return to the methods of peace and the constitutional limitations of power.

Fifth: The Civil Service of the Government has become a mere instrument of partisan tyranny and personal ambition and an object of selfish greed. It is a scandal and reproach upon free institutions and breeds a demoralization dangerous to the perpetuity of republican government. We therefore regard such thorough reforms of the Civil Service as one of the most pressing necessities of the hour; that honesty, capacity, and fidelity constitute the only valid claim to public employment; that the offices of the Government cease to be a matter of and patronage, and that public station become again a post of honor. To this end it is imperatively required that no President shall be a candidate for re-election.

Sixth: We demand a system of Federal taxation which shall not unnecessarily interfere with the industry of the people, and which shall provide the means necessary to pay the expenses of the Government economically administered, the pensions, the interest on the public debt, and a moderate reduction annually of the principal thereof; and, recognizing that there are in our midst honest but irreconcilable differences of opinion with regard to the respective systems of Protection and Free Trade, we remit the discussion of the subject to the people in their Congress Districts, and to the decision of Congress thereon, wholly free of Executive interference or dictation.

Seventh: The public credit must be sacredly maintained, and we denounce repudiation in every form and guise.

Eighth: A speedy return to specie payment is demanded alike by the highest considerations of commercial morality and honest government.

Ninth: We remember with gratitude the heroism and sacrifices of the soldiers and sailors of the Republic, and no act of ours shall ever detract from their justly-earned fame or the full reward of their patriotism.

Tenth: We are opposed to all further grants of lands to railroads or other corporations. The public domain should be held sacred to actual settlers.

Eleventh: We hold that it is the duty of the Government, in its intercourse with foreign nations to cultivate the friendship of peace, by treating with all on fair and equal terms, regarding it alike dishonorable either to demand what is not right, or to submit to what is wrong.

Twelfth: For the promotion and success of these vital principles and the support of the candidates nominated by this Convention, we invite and cordially welcome the co-operation of all patriotic citizens, without regard to previous affiliations.

== Presidential nomination ==
=== Presidential candidates ===
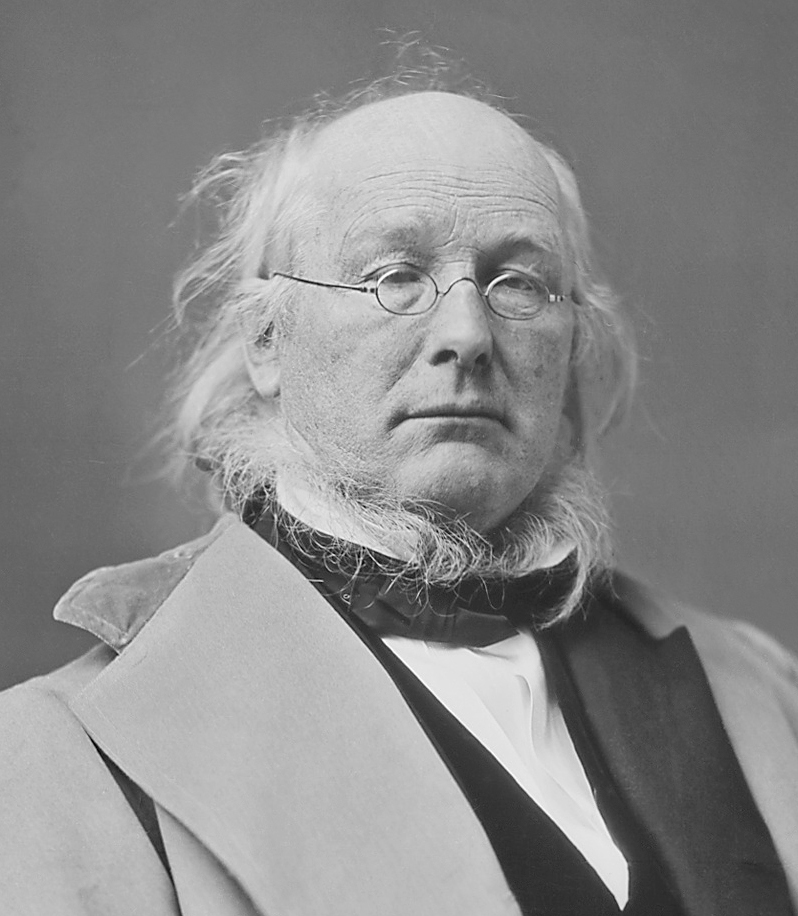
Former Representative Horace Greeley
of New York

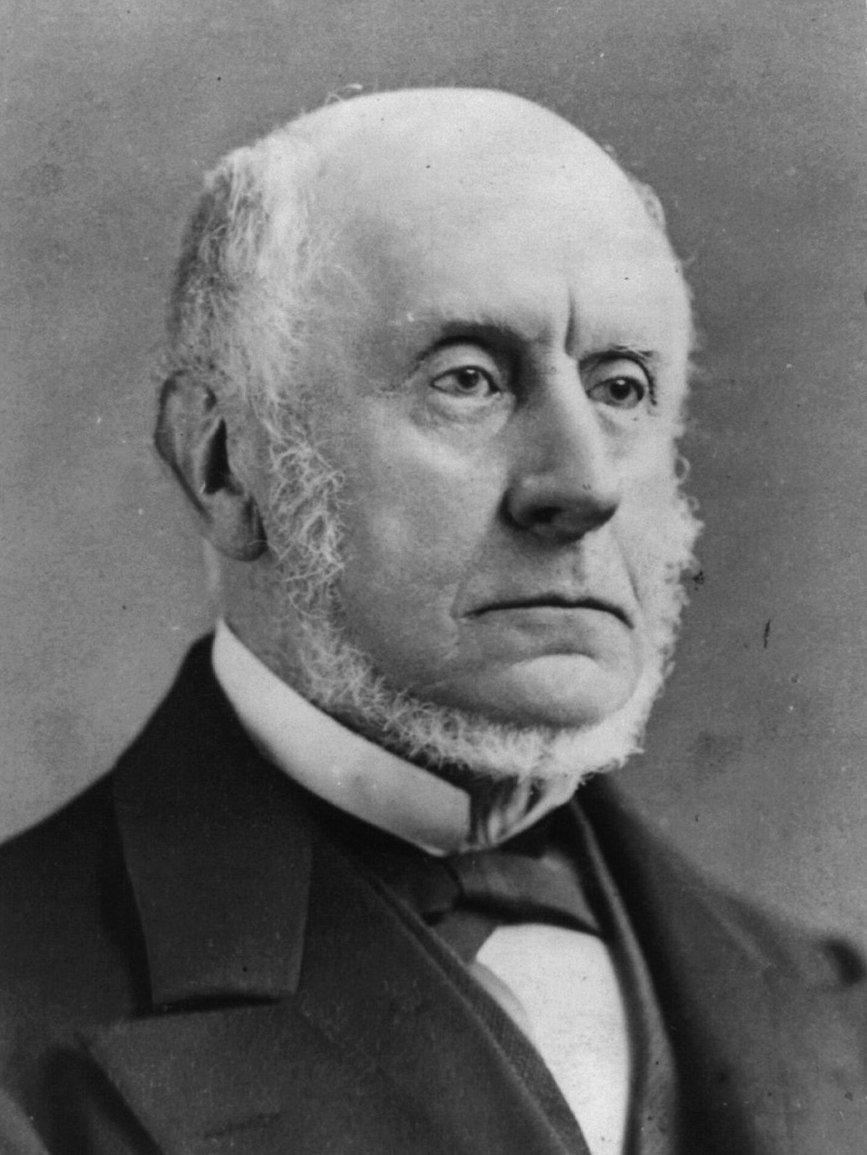
Former Representative Charles Francis Adams of Massachusetts

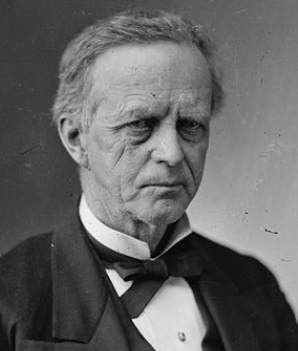
Senator
Lyman Trumbull
of Illinois

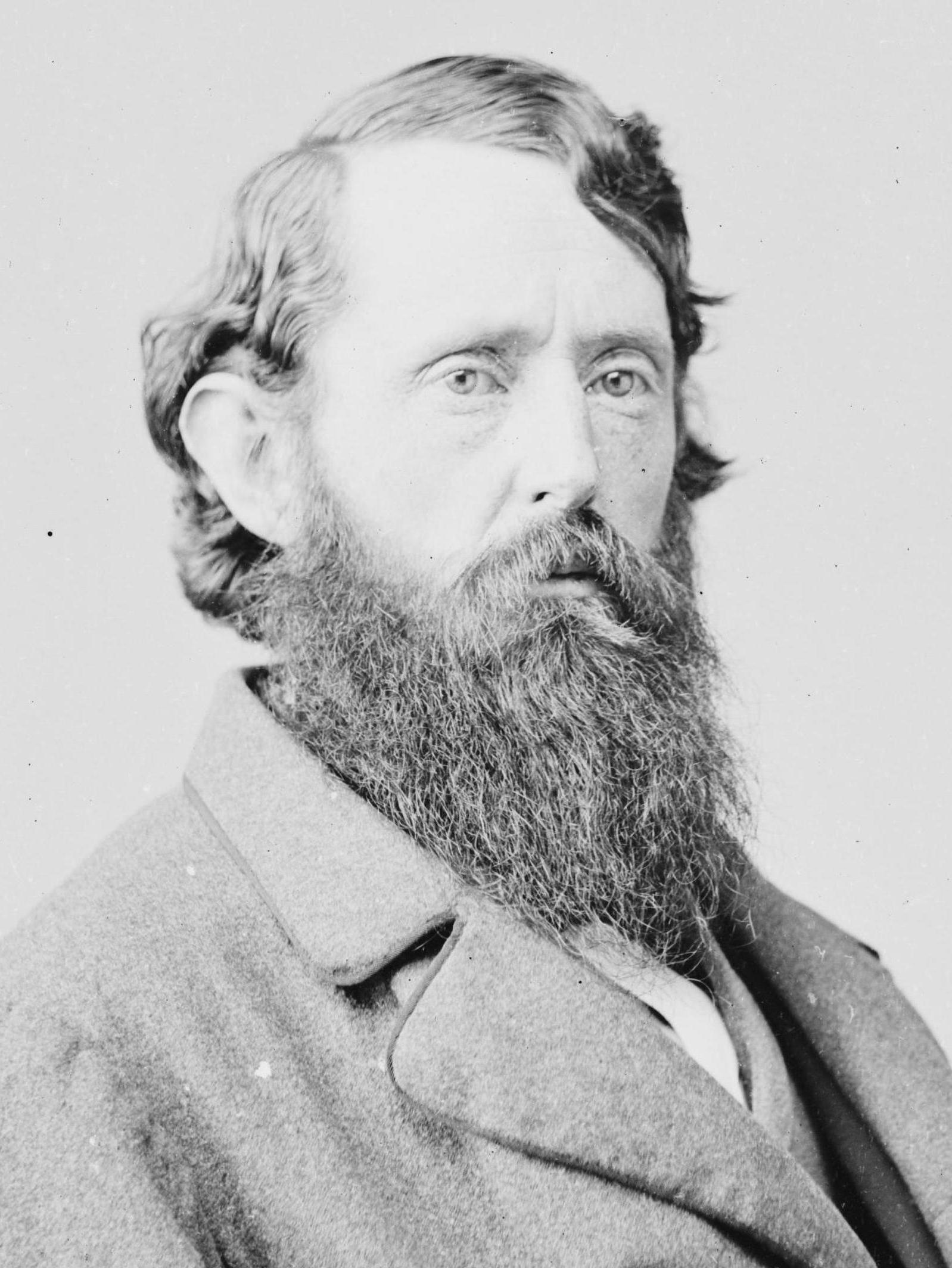
Governor
Benjamin Gratz Brown
of Missouri
(Withdrew during 1st Ballot - Endorsed Greeley)

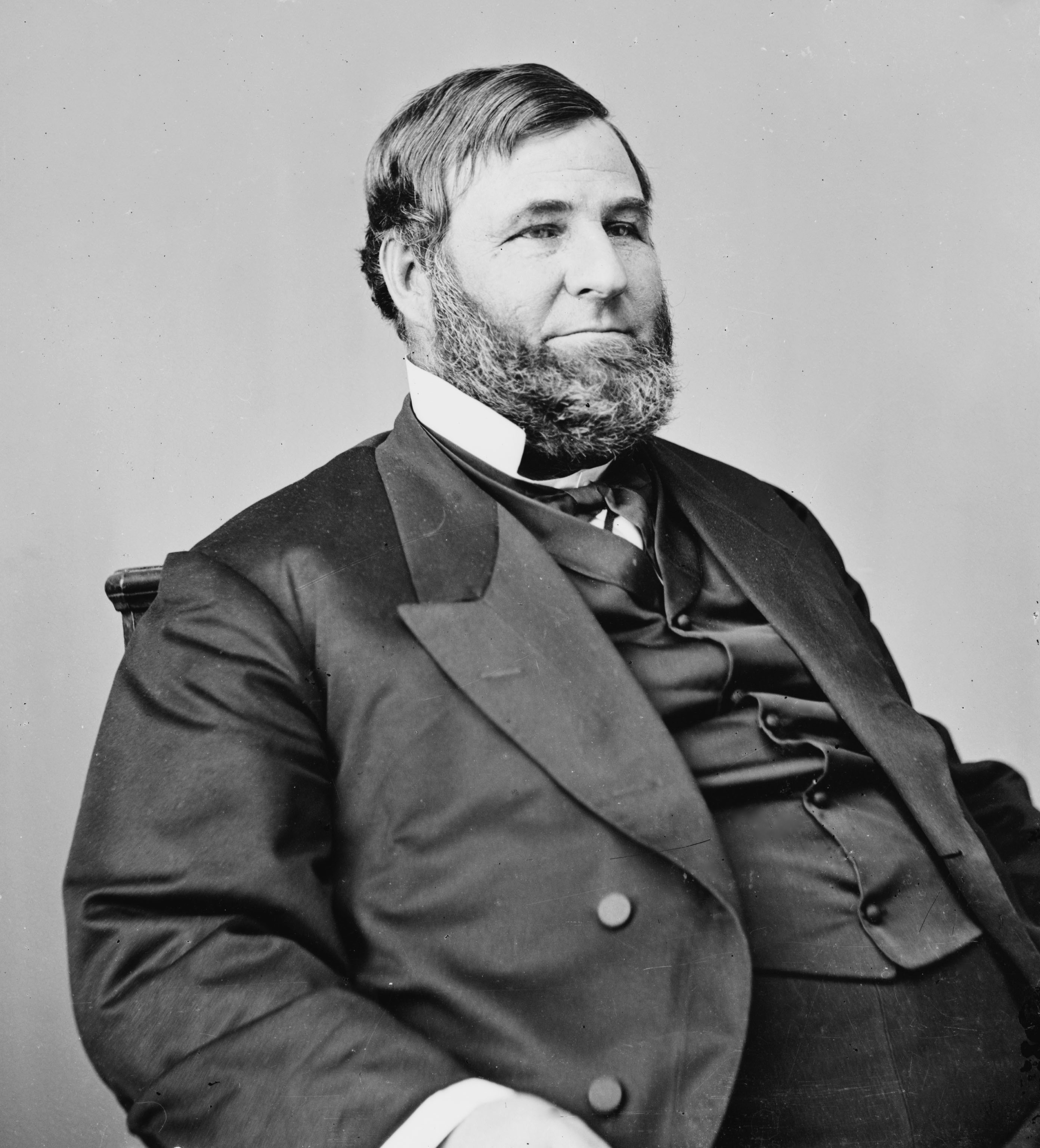
Associate Justice
David Davis
of Illinois

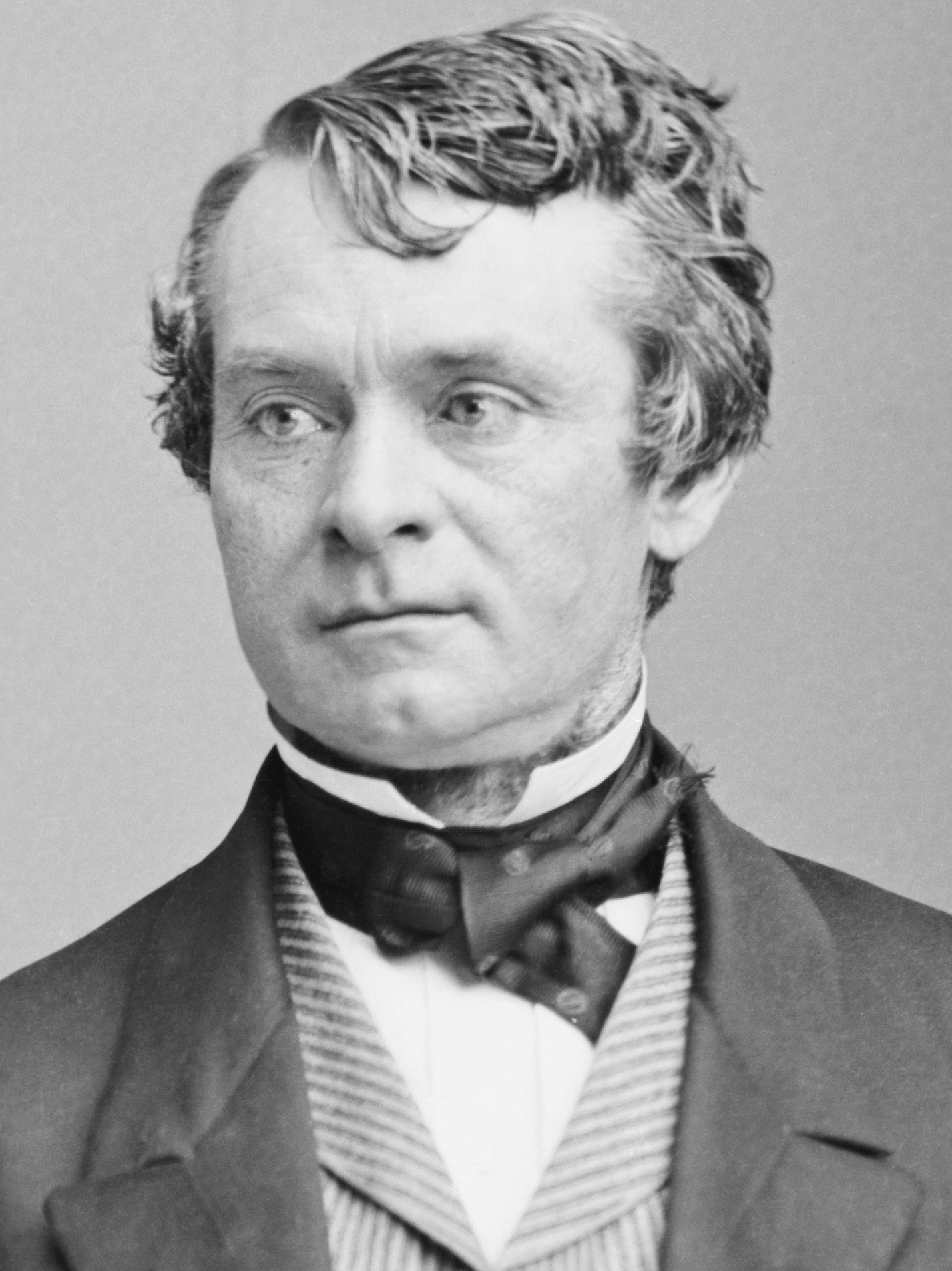
Former Governor Andrew Curtin
of Pennsylvania
(Withdrew after 1st Ballot)

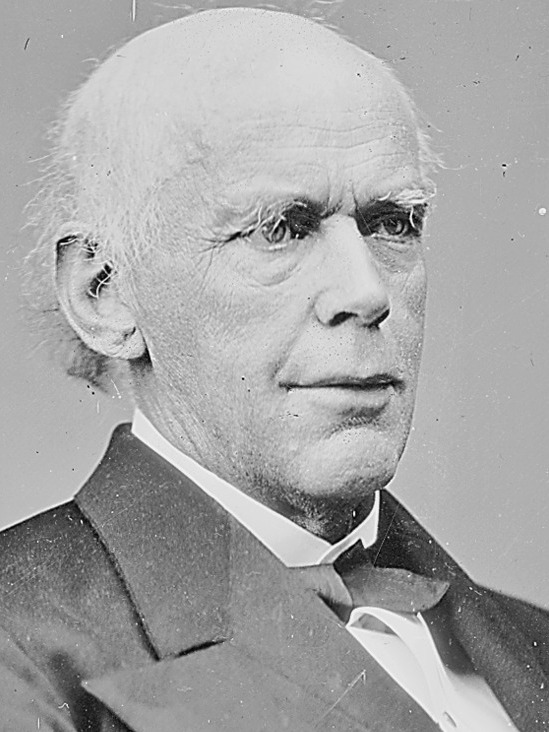
Chief Justice
Salmon P. Chase
of Ohio

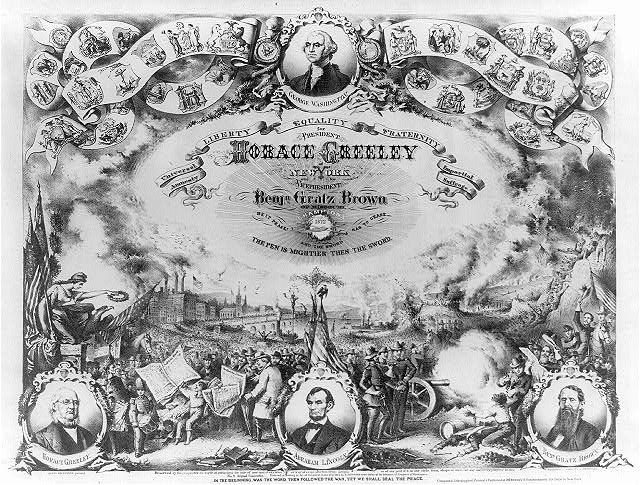
Liberal Republican campaign poster

Balloting for a presidential candidate began without a formal presentation of candidates. The strongest candidate of the convention was arguably Charles Francis Adams, whose family already had provided two presidents for the nation. But Adams was not receptive to the anticipated offer since he preferred to remain out of the national spotlight. Greeley was the second choice of the convention, having been jockeyed into this position by the overzealous opposition. Greeley's original strength was confined chiefly to the Southern states and his home state of New York.

Adams started strongly on the first ballot and led on four out of the five initial ballots. The announcement of Adams' vote after the fifth ballot was "received with great cheers" as he was only 49 votes shy of the nomination. But when it was realized Adams would never be accepted by the Democrats of the South, with whom the Liberal Republicans were hoping to form an alliance, Greeley's strength increased. It was generally accepted that Greeley, with the possible exception of Judge Davis, was less objectionable to the South than any of the candidates brought before the convention.

After an unrevised sixth ballot, Greeley was 26 votes short of clinching the nomination. Before the vote was announced, various states changed their vote in a scene of great confusion and noise, thereby making it impossible for reporters and secretaries to track. Greeley was apparently nominated when the chair finally announced the result of the revised sixth ballot. The chair stated that the secretaries said it was impossible to read the votes by states, as the clerks would only note the many changes which had occurred without recording the states in which they occurred. Mr. Cochrane inquired if Greeley had a majority. The chair replied in the affirmative and declared Greeley's nomination as the presidential candidate of the convention.

Mr. Case moved that the nomination be declared unanimous but the motion was lost as there were many noes from Adams' more ardent supporters.

Presidential Ballot
Ballot	1st	2nd	2nd (Note: after revisions)	3rd	4th	5th	6th	6th
Greeley	147	239	245	258	251	258	332	482
Adams	205	243	243	264	279	309	324	187
Trumbull	110	148	148	146	141	91	19	
Brown	95	2	2	2	2	2	0	
Davis	92.5	81	75	44	41	30	6	
Curtin	62	0	0	0	0	0	0	
Chase	2.5	1	1	0	0	24	32	
Palmer	0	0	0	0	0	0	1	
Scattered	0	0	0	0	0	0	0	45
Not Represented	18	18	18	18	18	18	18	18

Presidential Balloting / 3rd Day of Convention (May 3, 1872)

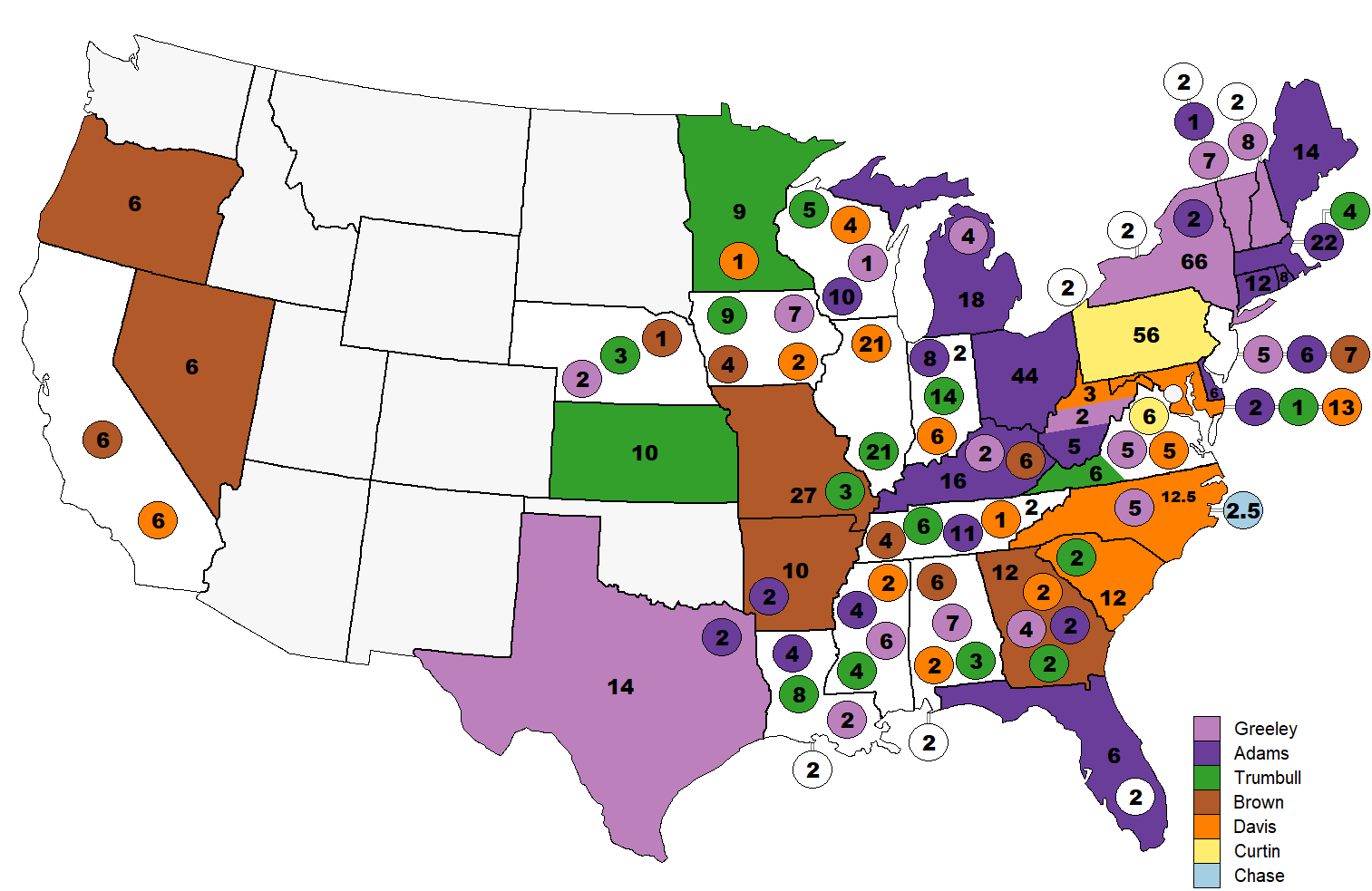
1st Presidential Ballot

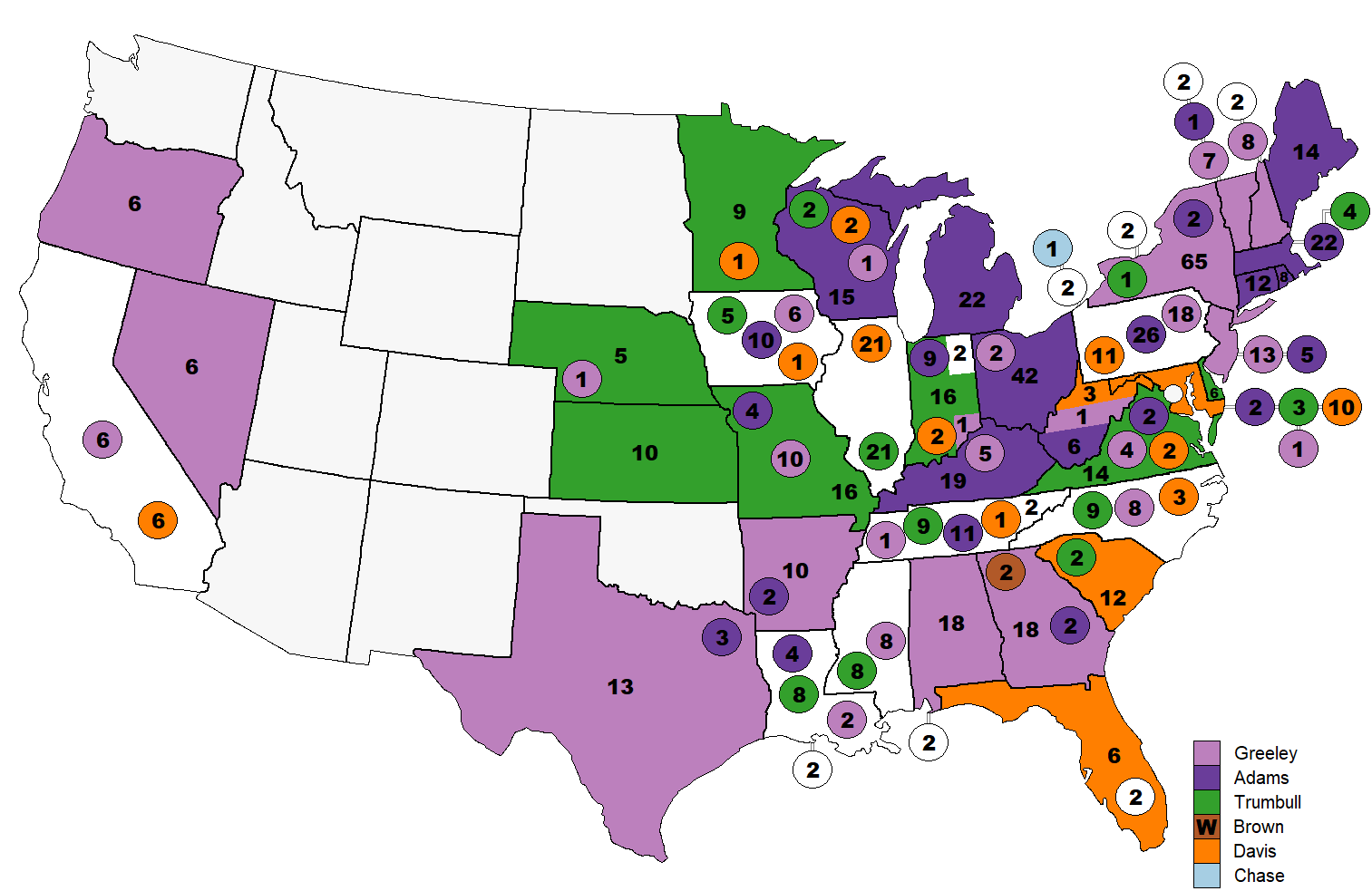
2nd Presidential Ballot
(Before Shifts)

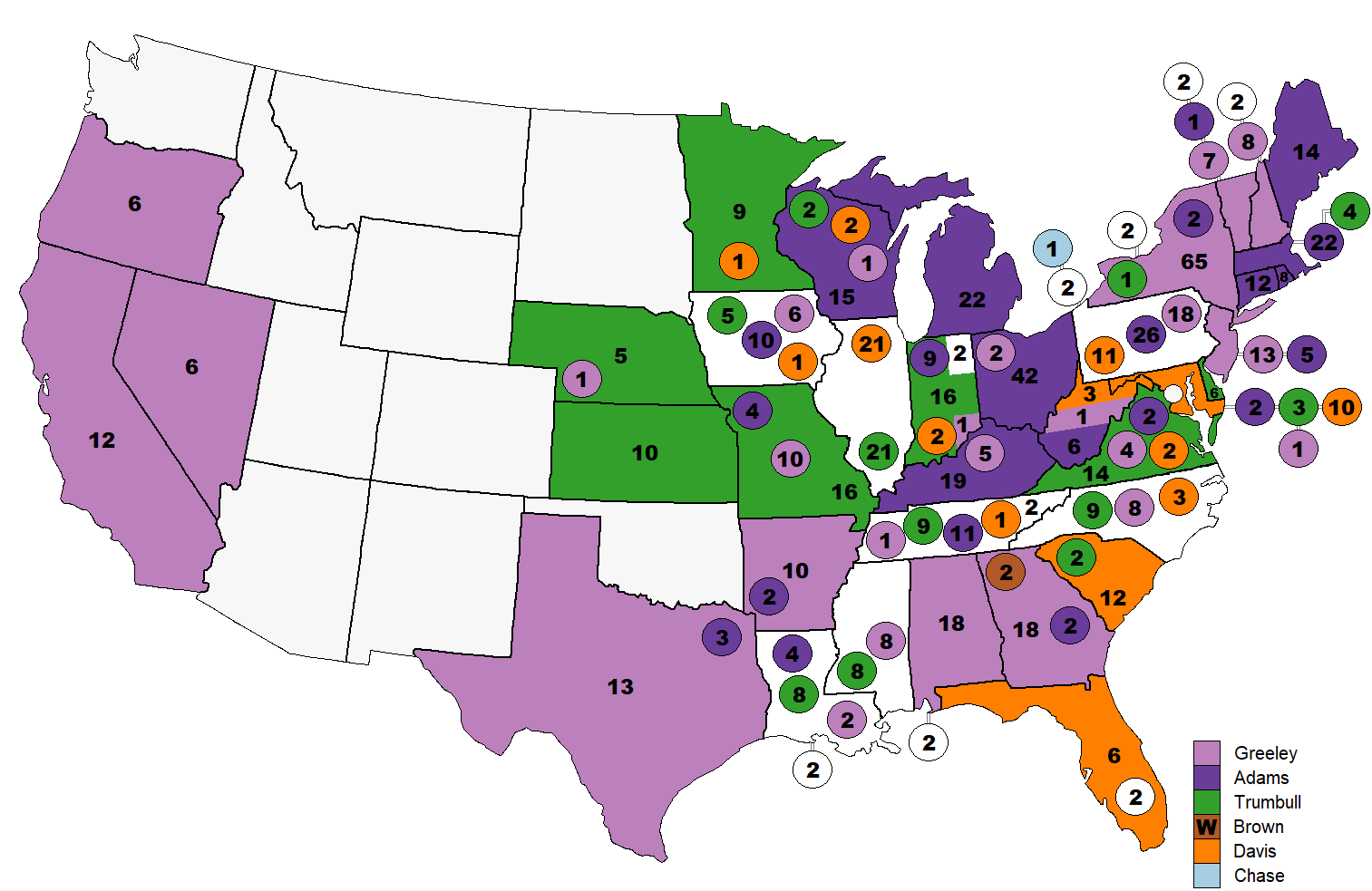
2nd Presidential Ballot
(After Shifts)

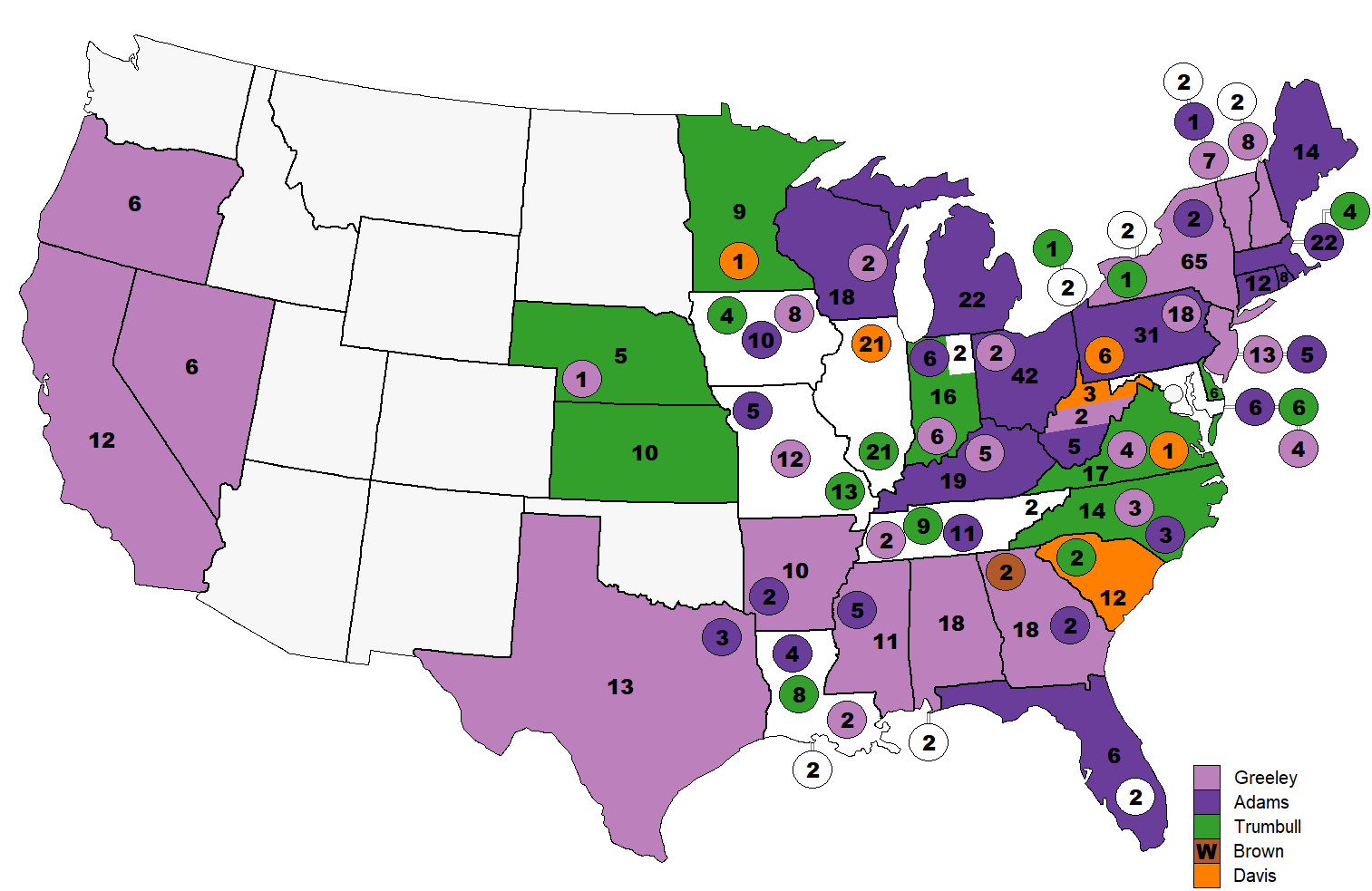
3rd Presidential Ballot

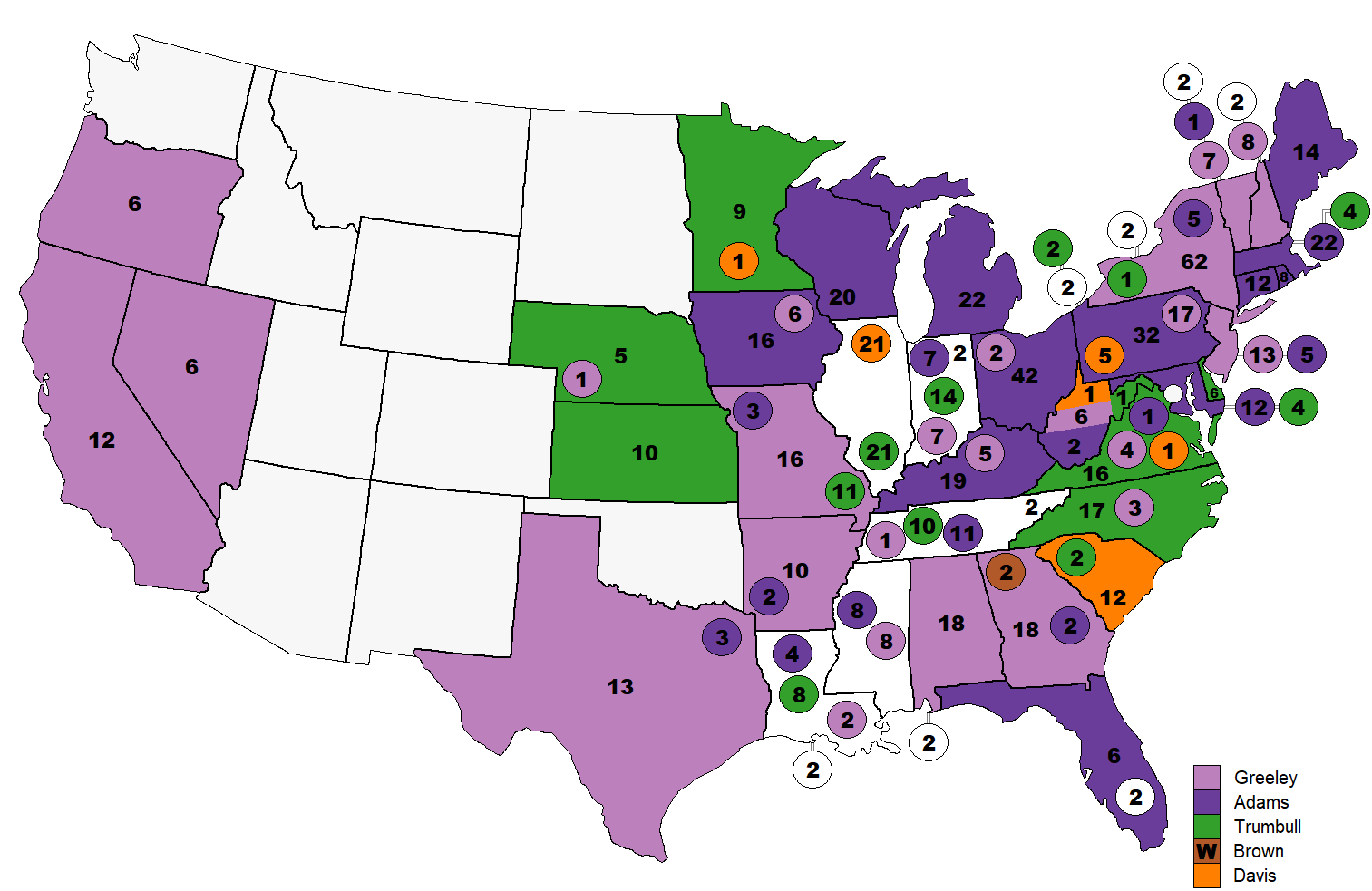
4th Presidential Ballot

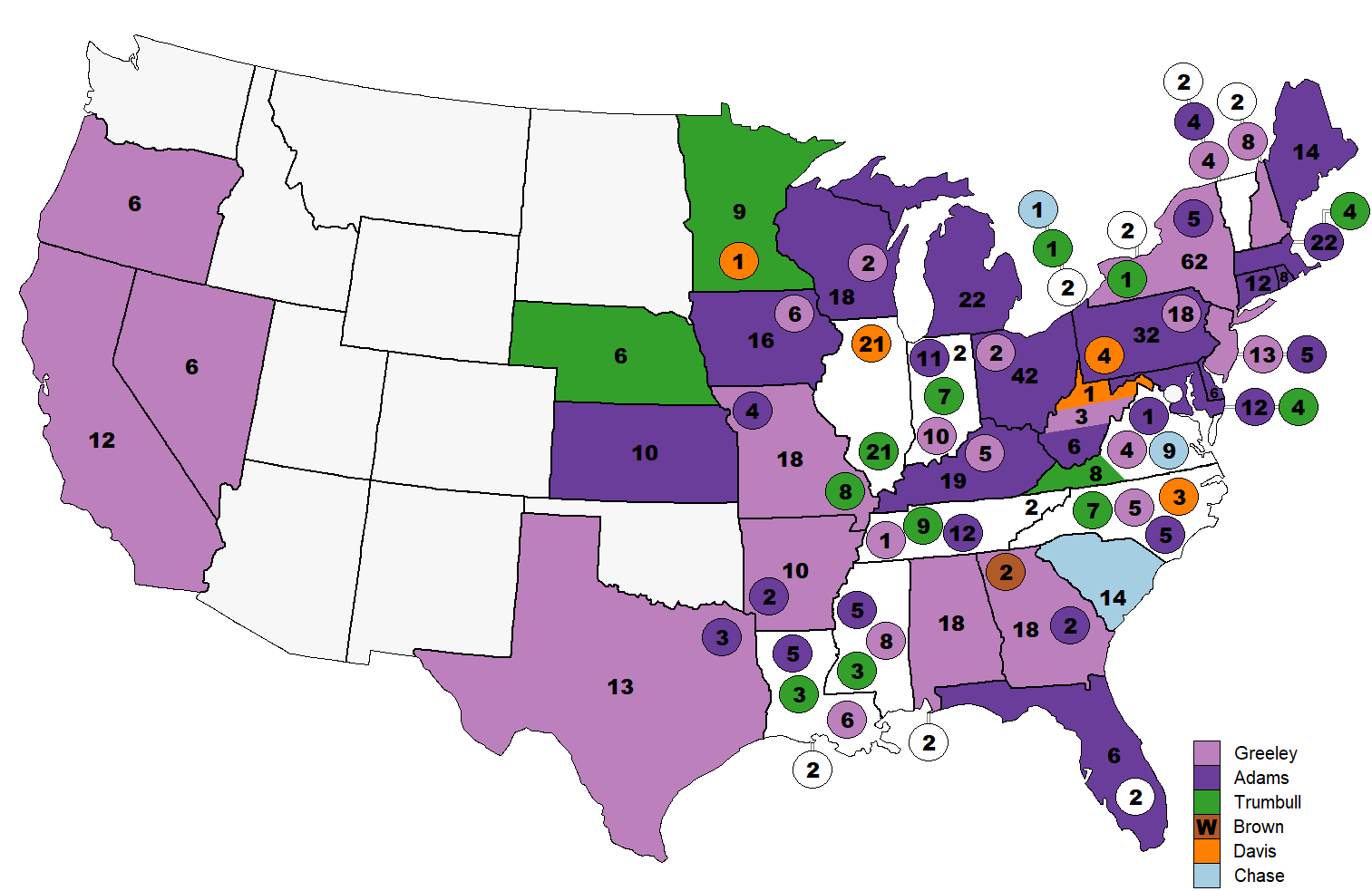
5th Presidential Ballot

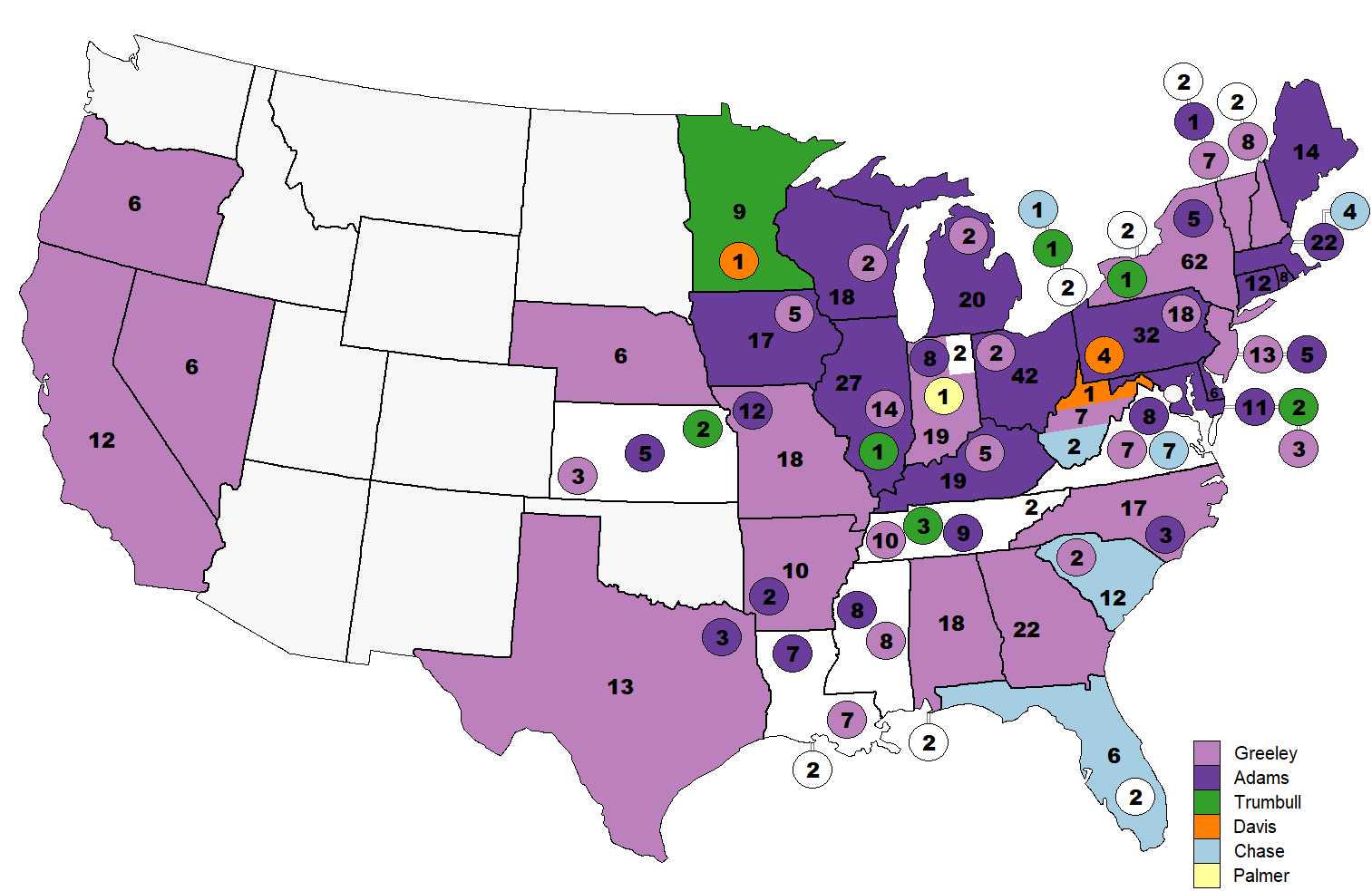
6th Presidential Ballot
(Before Shifts)

== Vice Presidential nomination ==
=== Vice Presidential candidates ===
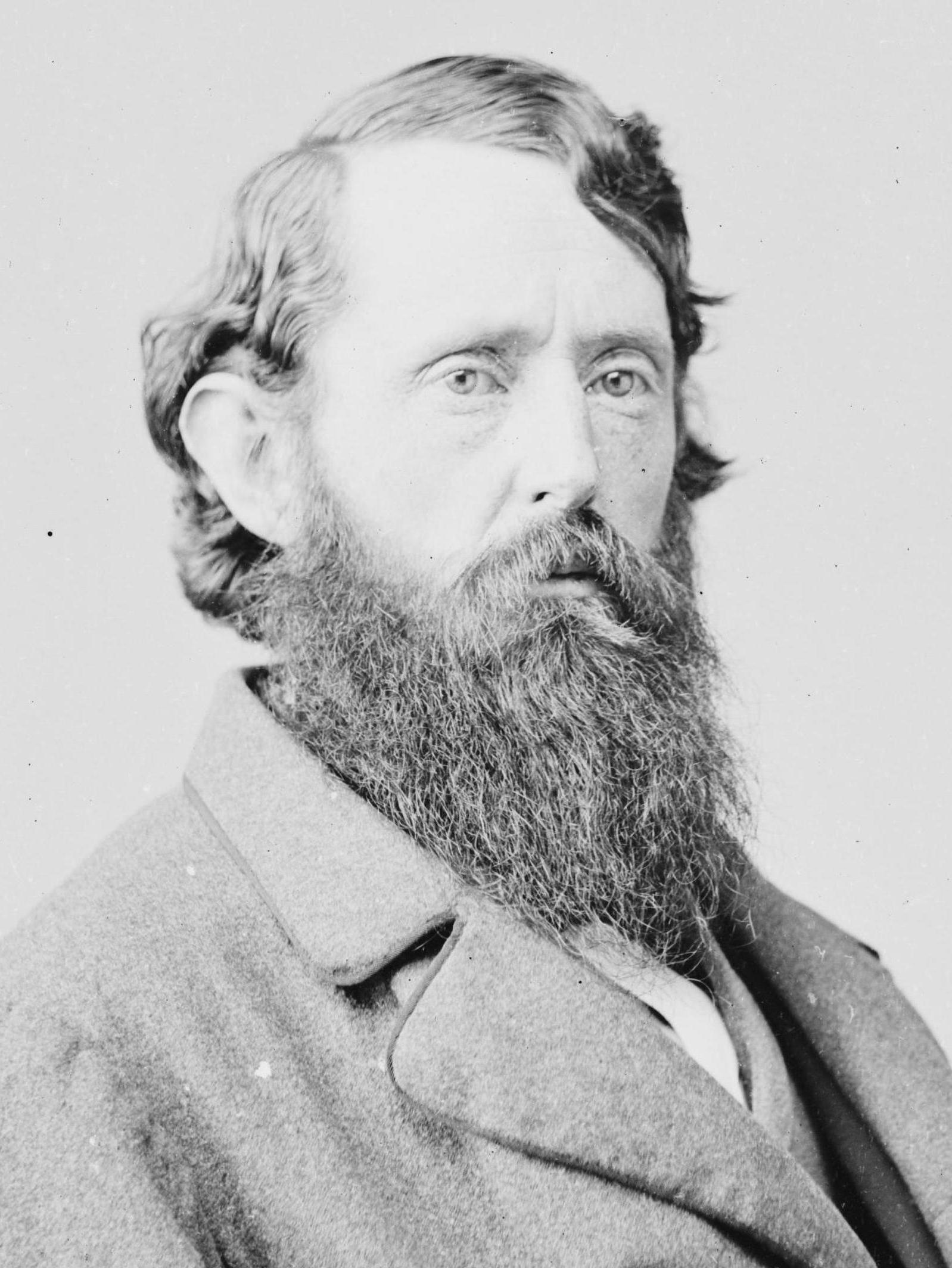
Governor
Benjamin Gratz Brown
of Missouri

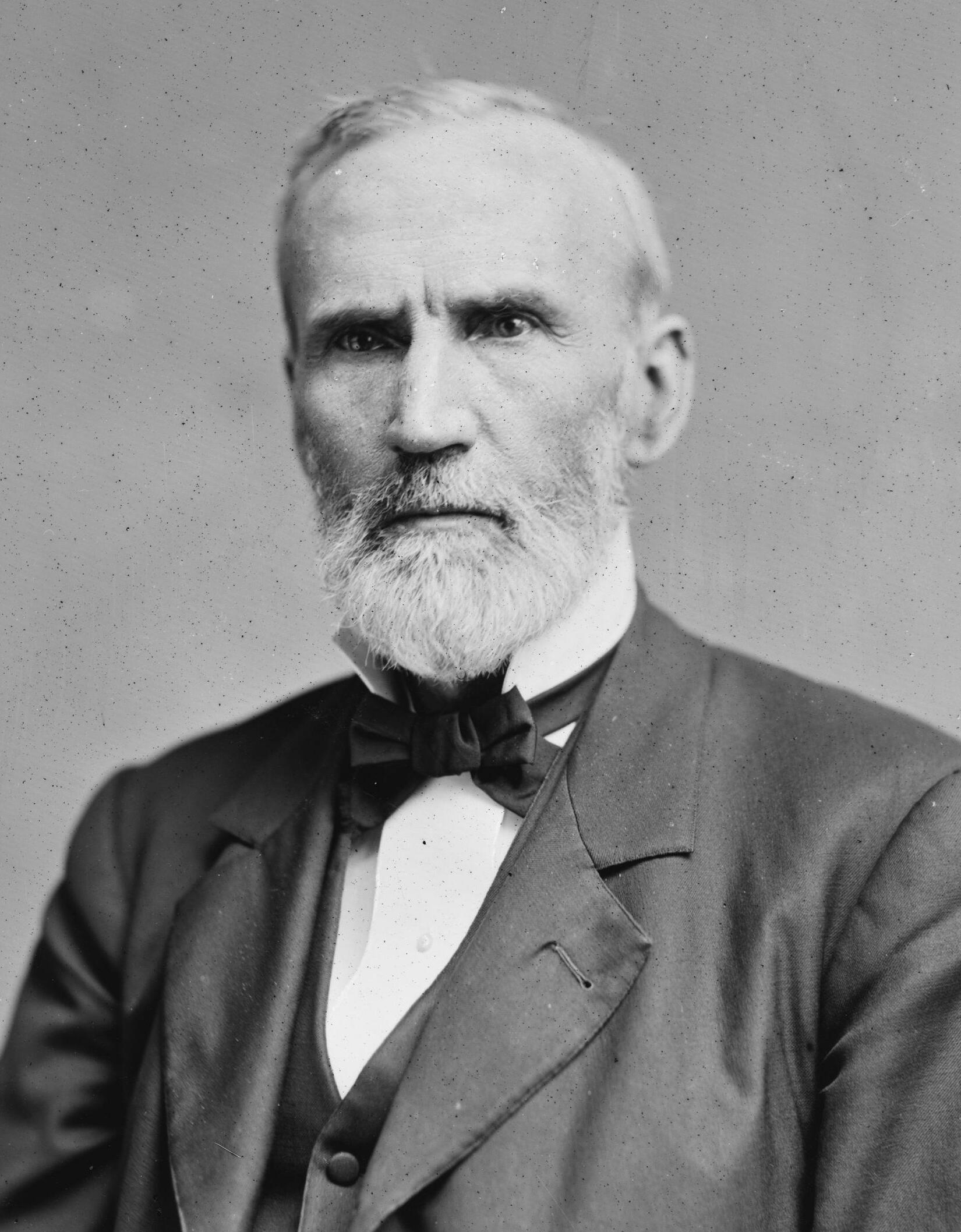
Former Representative George W. Julian
of Indiana

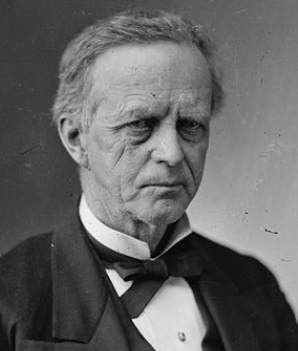
Senator
Lyman Trumbull
of Illinois
(Declined)

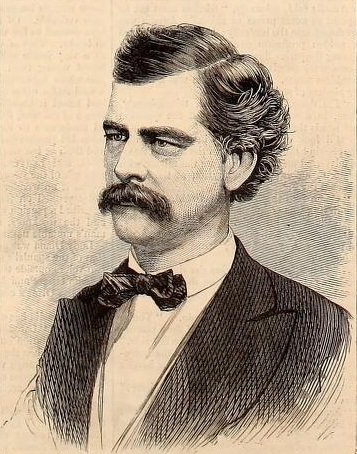
Governor
Gilbert Walker
of Virginia

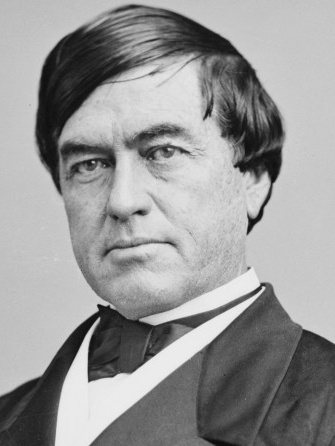
Former Ambassador Cassius M. Clay
of Kentucky
(Declined - Endorsed Brown)

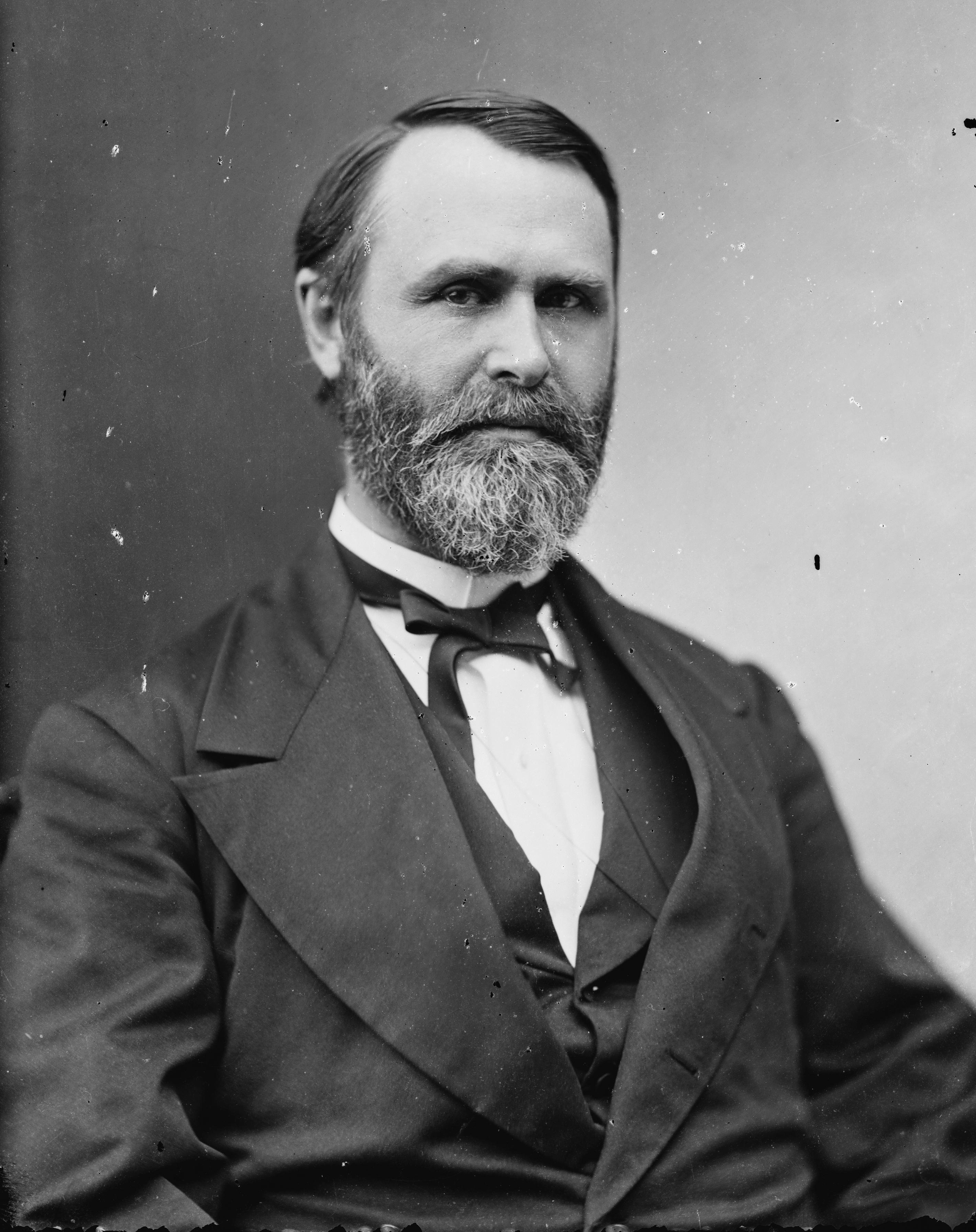
Former Interior Secretary
Jacob D. Cox
of Ohio
(Declined)

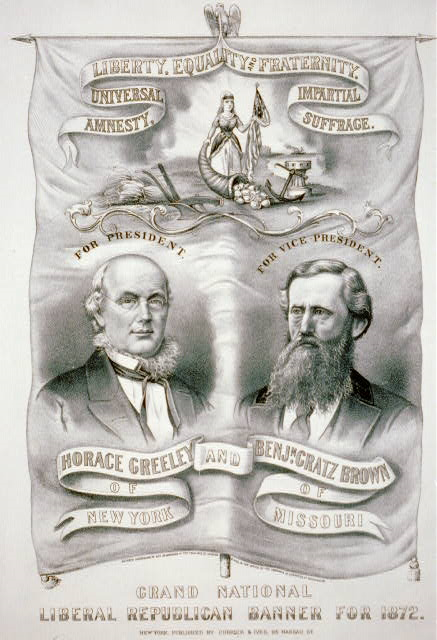
Greeley/Brown campaign poster

On motion, it was ordered to proceed to the nomination of a vice presidential candidate immediately.

Several potential candidates withdrew themselves from consideration. When a delegate inquired whether Senator Trumbull was a candidate for vice president and if he would accept, Governor Koerner replied on Trumbull's behalf that the Illinois senator would not accept under any circumstances. When Illinois and Kentucky cast votes for Cassius Clay, the former ambassador to Russia made it known that he was not to be considered a candidate. Instead, Clay urged his friends to vote for Governor Brown. An Iowa delegate nominated former Interior Secretary Cox, commending him as "the man who was too pure to stay in the stink-hole of Washington." After garnering 25 votes on the first ballot, a delegate from Ohio announced that Mr. Cox's name was not before the convention. Cox was against Greeley's nomination and would eventually withdraw his support for the Liberal Republican Revolt.

Brown was declared the Vice Presidential nominee after the second ballot. A motion was made to make the vote unanimous, and it was declared carried, though there were some dissenting votes.

Vice Presidential Ballot
Ballot	1st	2nd
Brown	236	435
Julian	134.5	175
Trumbull	158	0
Walker	84.5	75
Clay	44	0
Cox	25	0
Scovel	12	0
Tipton	8	3
Palmer	0	8
Not Represented	18	18
Not Voting	12	18

Vice Presidential Balloting / 3rd Day of Convention (May 3, 1872)

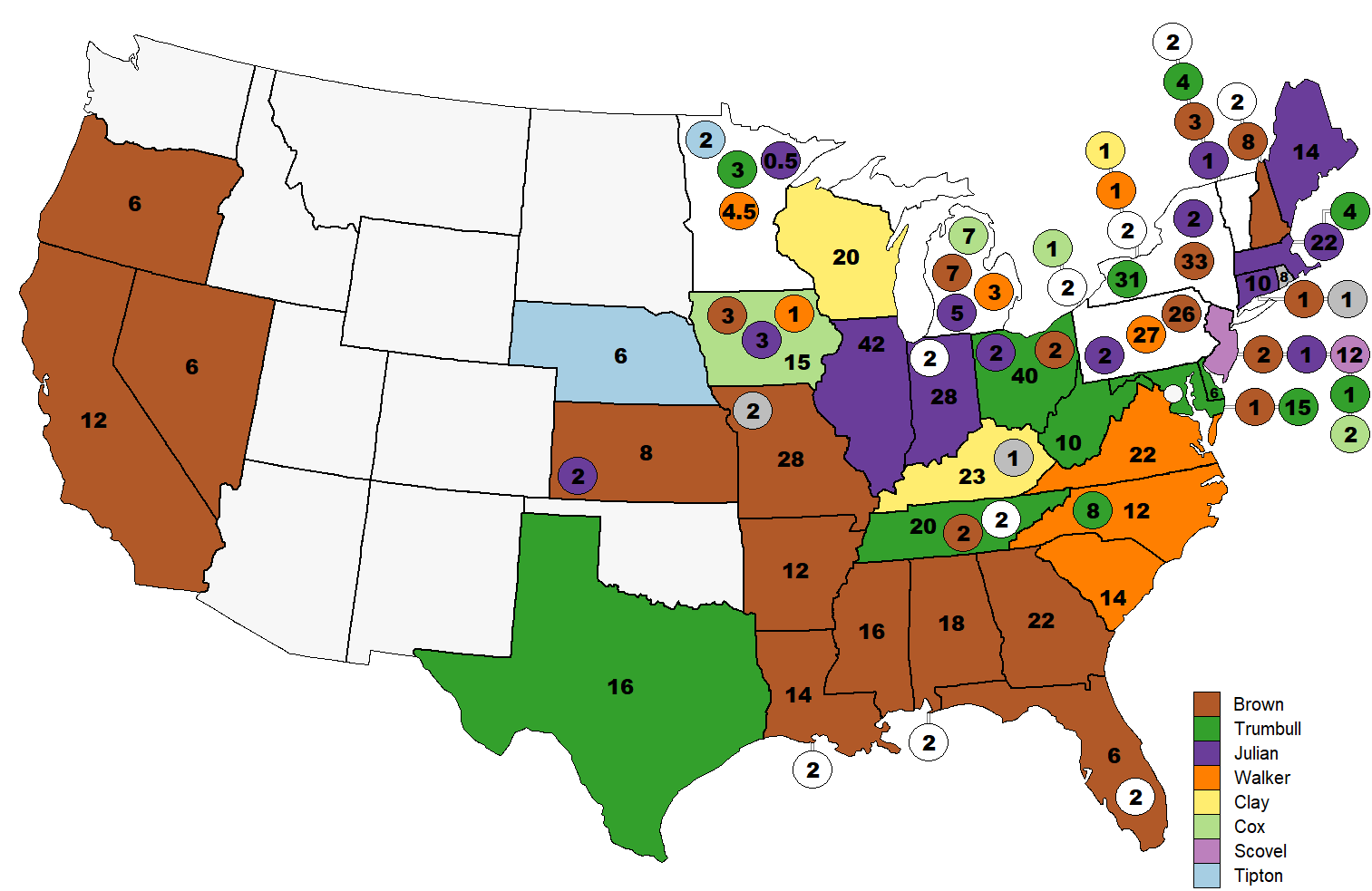
1st
Vice Presidential Ballot

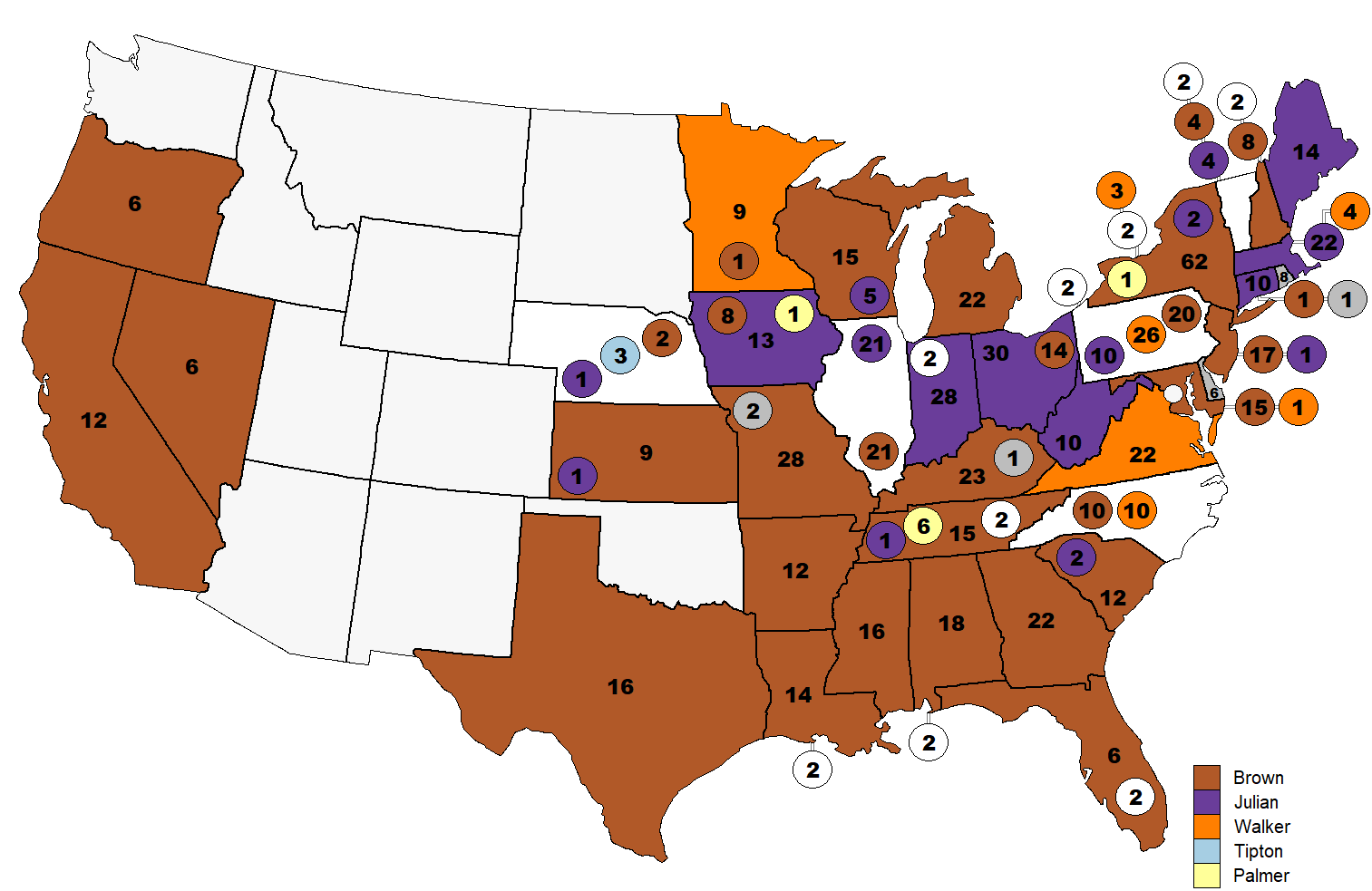
2nd
Vice Presidential Ballot
