= 1872 Democratic National Convention =

U.S. political event held in Baltimore, Maryland

- 1872 presidential election
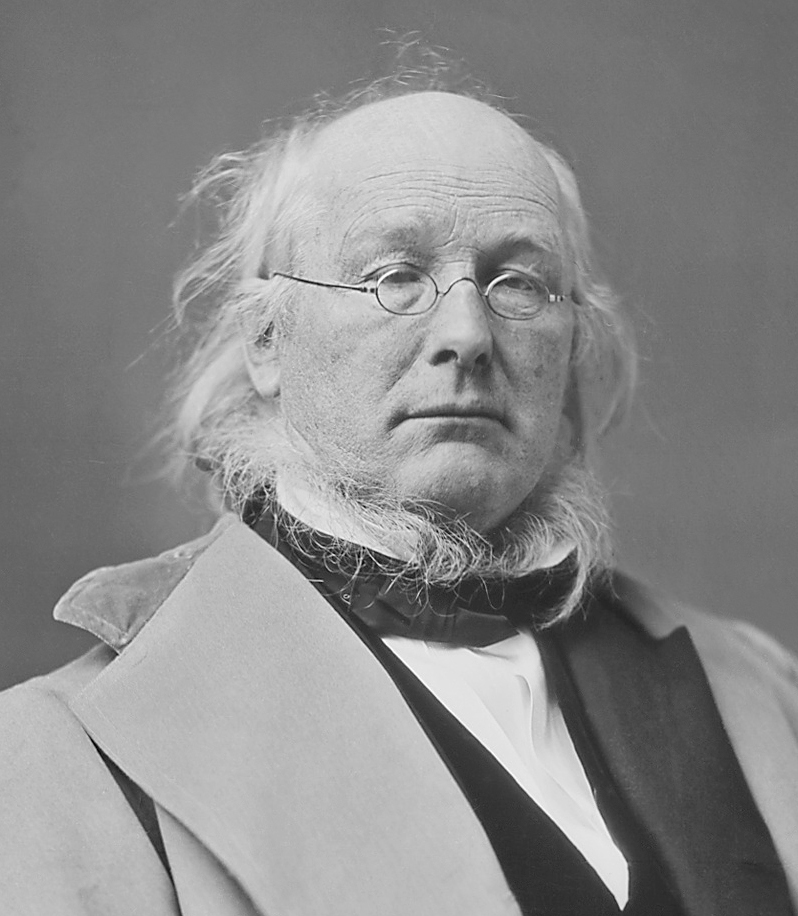
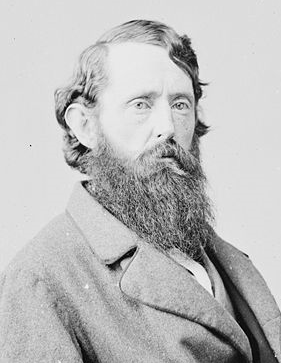
- Nominees; Greeley and Brown

Convention
- Date(s): July 9–10, 1872
- City: Baltimore, Maryland
- Venue: Ford's Grand Opera House, East Fayette Street (between North Howard & Eutaw Streets)

Candidates
- Presidential nominee: Horace Greeley of New York
- Vice-presidential nominee: Benjamin Gratz Brown of Missouri

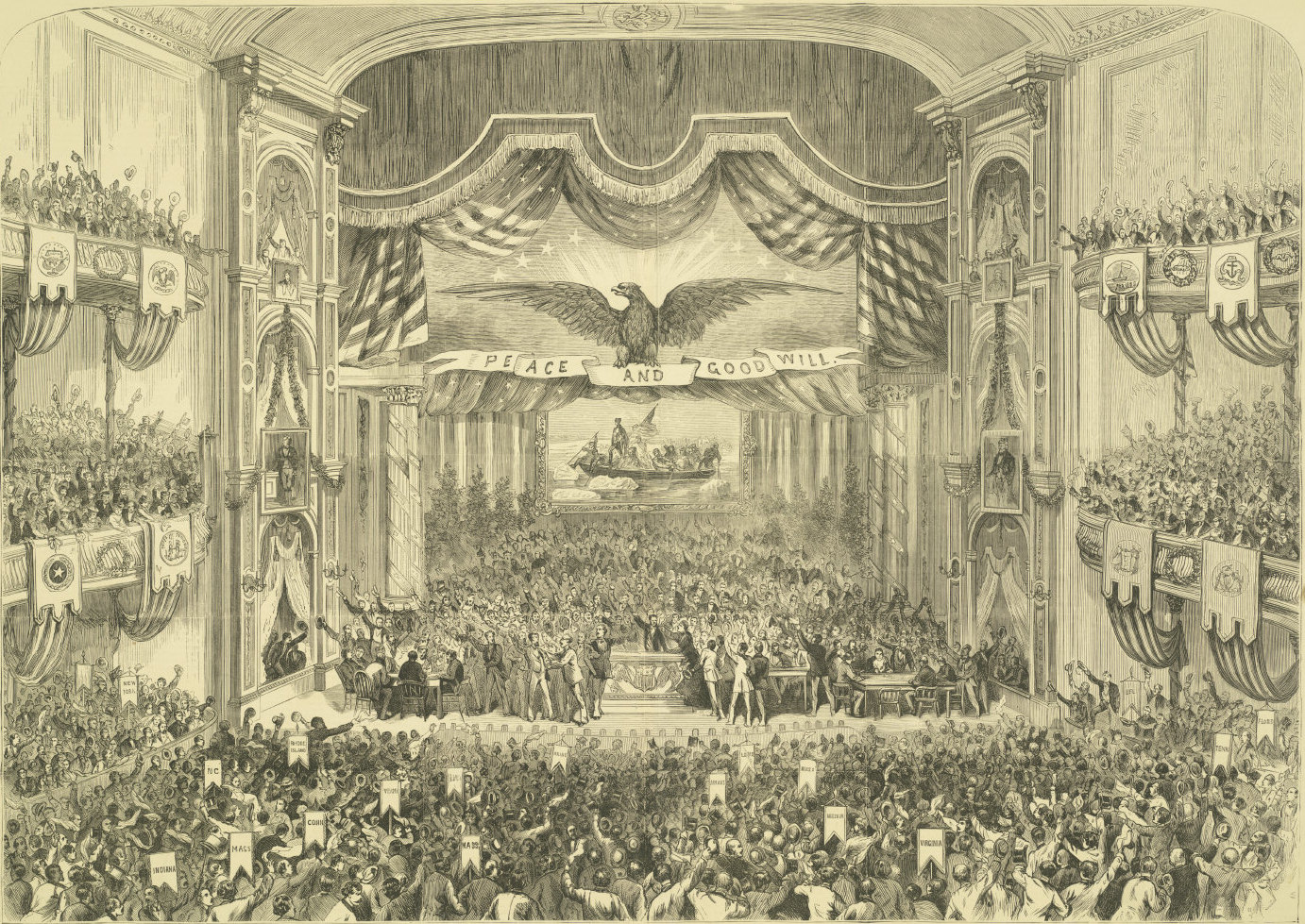
Interior of Ford's Grand Opera House of John T. Ford (1829–1894) on East Fayette Street between North Howard and Eutaw Streets in Baltimore during the 1872 Democratic National Convention. Built 1871, razed 1964.

The 1872 Democratic National Convention was a presidential nominating convention held at Ford's Grand Opera House on East Fayette Street, between North Howard and North Eutaw Streets, in Baltimore, Maryland on July 9 and 10, 1872. It resulted in the nomination of newspaper publisher Horace Greeley of New York and Governor Benjamin Gratz Brown of Missouri for president and vice president, a ticket previously nominated by the rump Liberal Republican faction convention meeting, also held in Baltimore's newly built premier Opera House of nationally well-known theatre owner/operator John T. Ford (infamous as the owner of the Ford's Theatre in Washington, D.C. where 16th President Abraham Lincoln was assassinated in April 1865) of the major Republican Party, which had already re-nominated incumbent President Ulysses S. Grant of the regular Republicans for another term.

The convention was called to order by Democratic National Committee chairman August Belmont. Thomas Jefferson Randolph served as the convention's temporary chairman and James R. Doolittle served as permanent president. At six hours in length, stretched over two days, the convention was the shortest meeting of a major political party convention in history.

== The convention ==
Accepting the "Liberal Republican" platform meant the Democrats had accepted the "New Departure", rejecting the anti-Reconstruction platform of 1868: they realized that in order to win, they had to look forward and not try to refight the Civil War.

While Greeley's long reputation in the years before as the most aggressive attacker of the earlier Democratic Party, its principles, its leadership, and its activists cooled enthusiasm among many of the delegates for the potential nominee, it was accepted that the Democrats would only split the anti-Grant vote and all but assure Grant of re-election if they nominated any other candidate.

== Presidential nomination ==
=== Presidential candidates ===
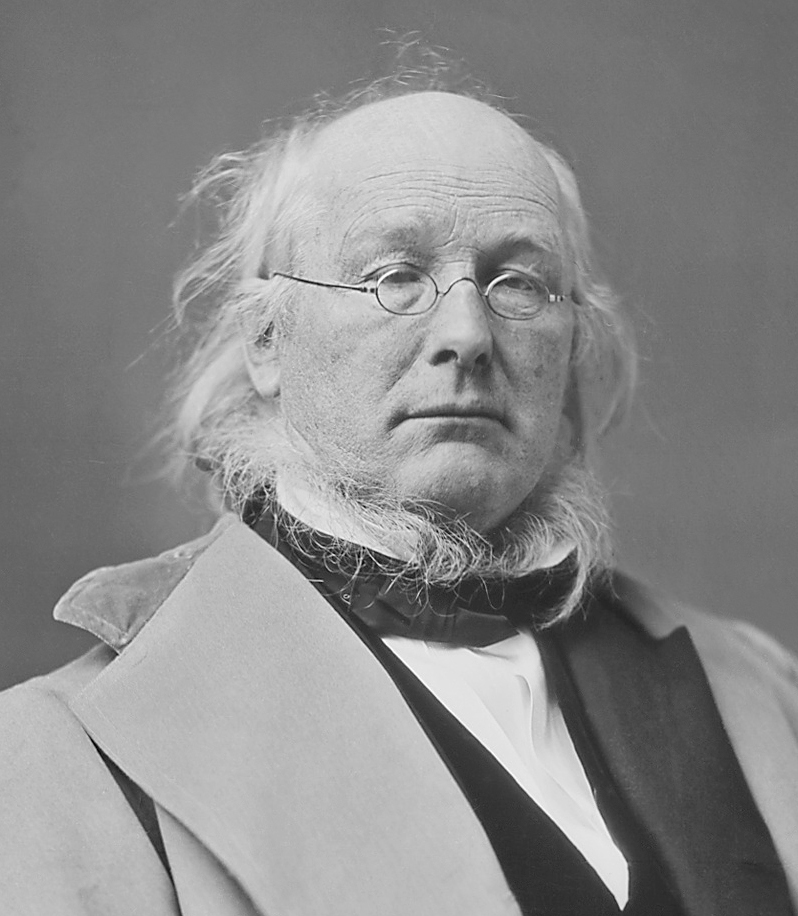
Former Representative
Horace Greeley
of New York

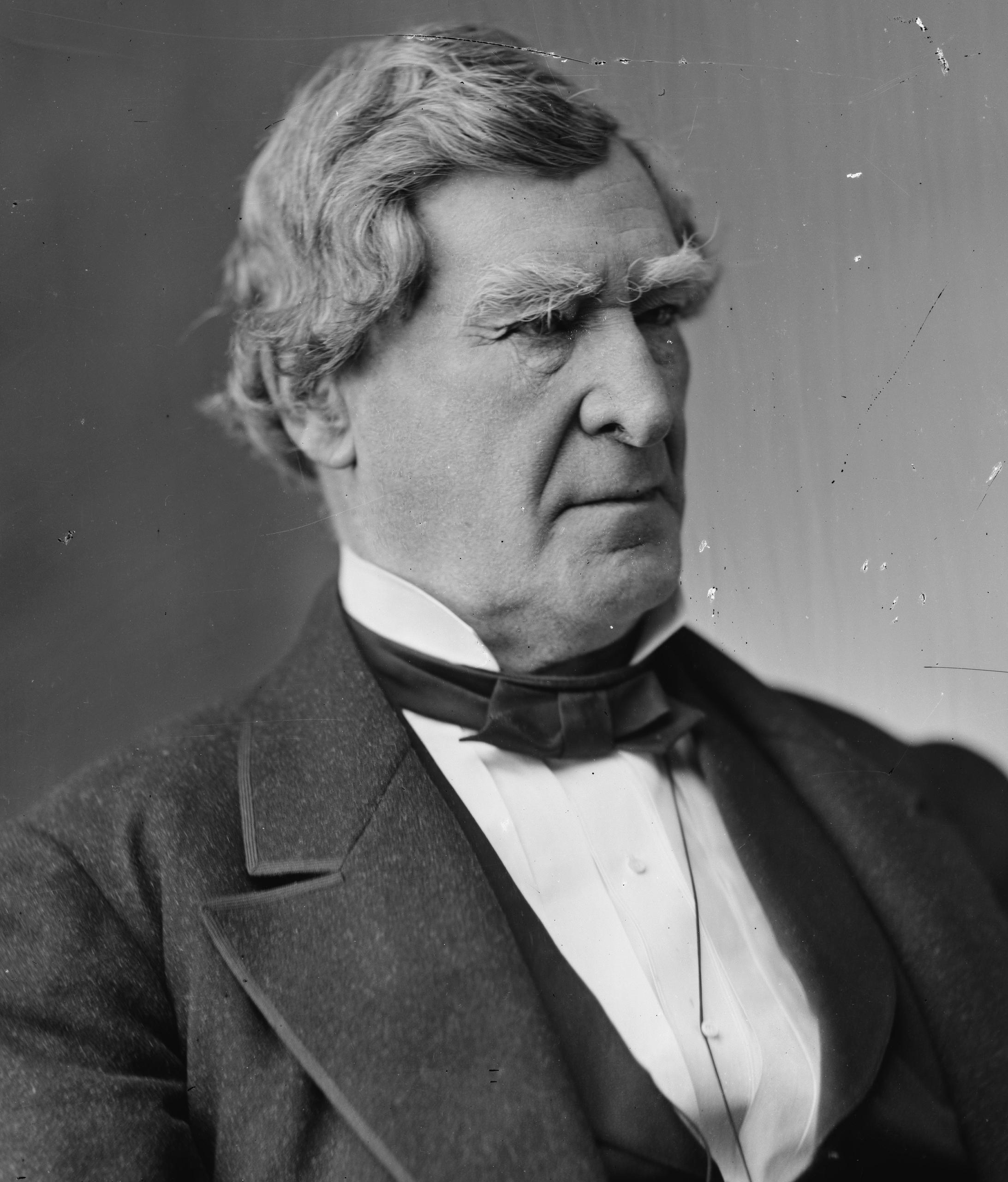
Former Secretary of State
Jeremiah S. Black
of Pennsylvania

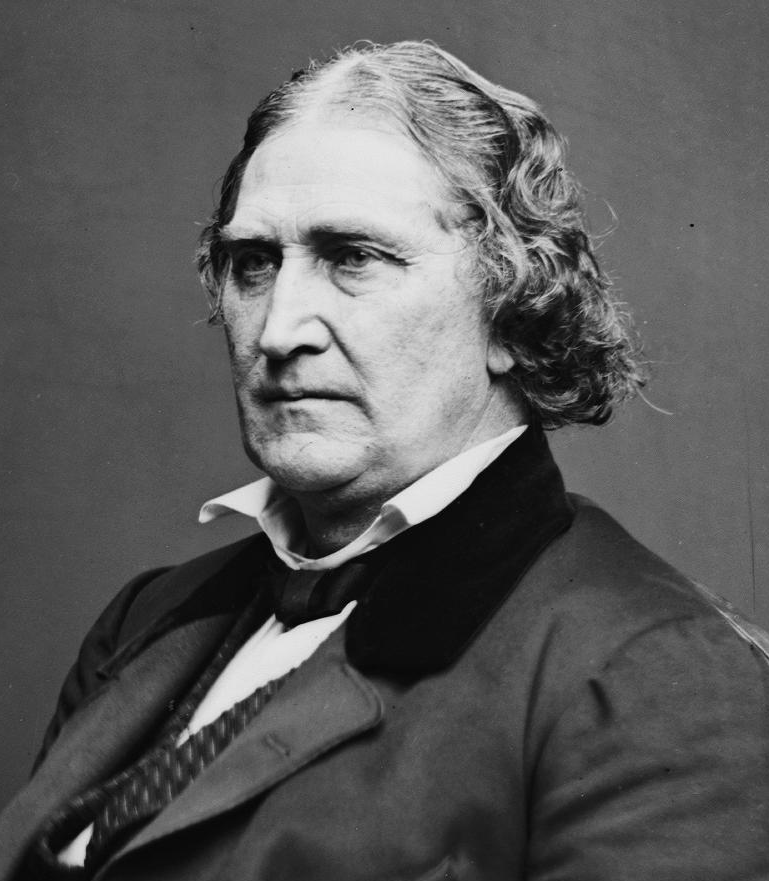
Former Senator
James A. Bayard
of Delaware

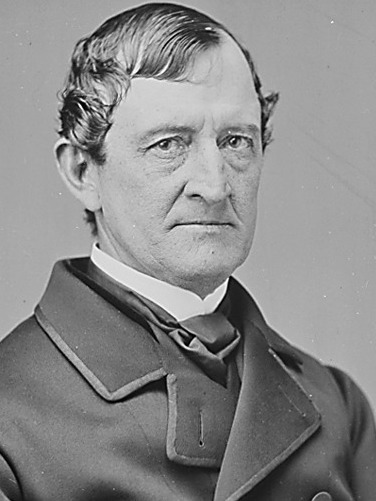
Former Representative William S. Groesbeck
of Ohio

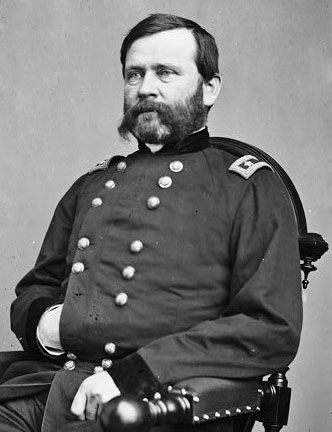
Major General
William B. Franklin
of Connecticut
(Declined Consideration)

Major General William B. Franklin was approached by a group of Democrats from Pennsylvania and New Jersey who urged him to run against Horace Greeley for the party's presidential nomination. Citing a need for party unity, Franklin declined their suggestion. On the first ballot, Pennsylvania and New Jersey would cast the majority of votes against Greeley.

Horace Greeley received 686 of the 732 delegate votes cast on the first ballot. The motion to have Greeley's nomination be declared unanimous was carried.

Presidential Ballot
	1st	Unanimous
Greeley	686	732
Black	21	0
Bayard	15	0
Groesbeck	2	0
Not Voting	8	0

Source: Official proceedings of the National Democratic convention, held at Baltimore, July 9, 1872. (September 3, 2012).

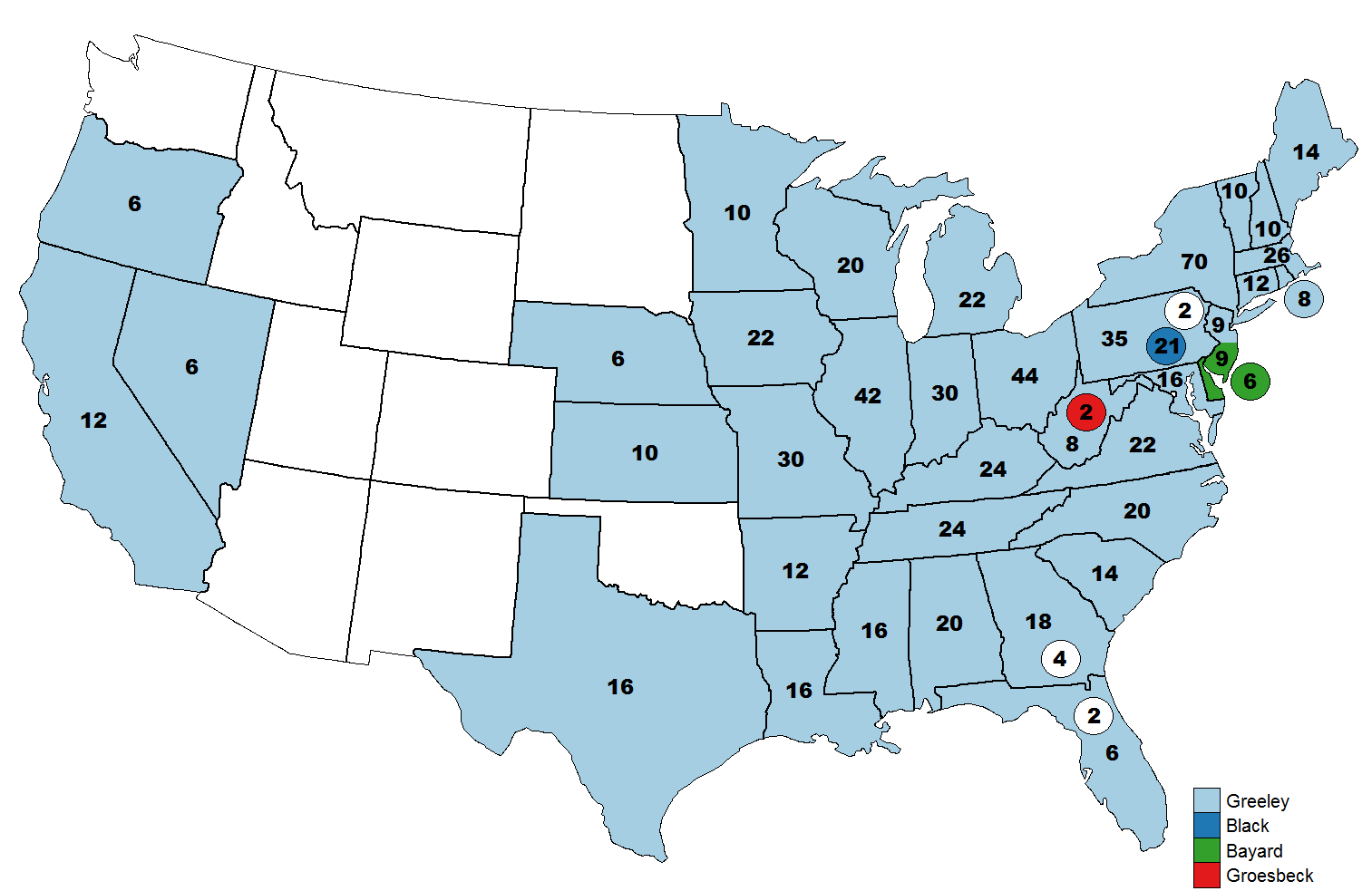
1st Presidential Ballot

== Vice presidential nomination ==
=== Vice presidential candidates ===
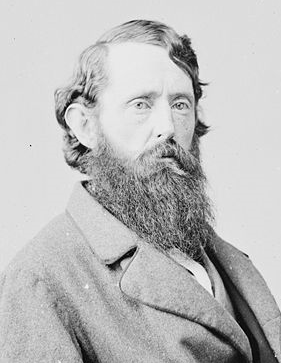
Governor
Benjamin Gratz Brown
of Missouri

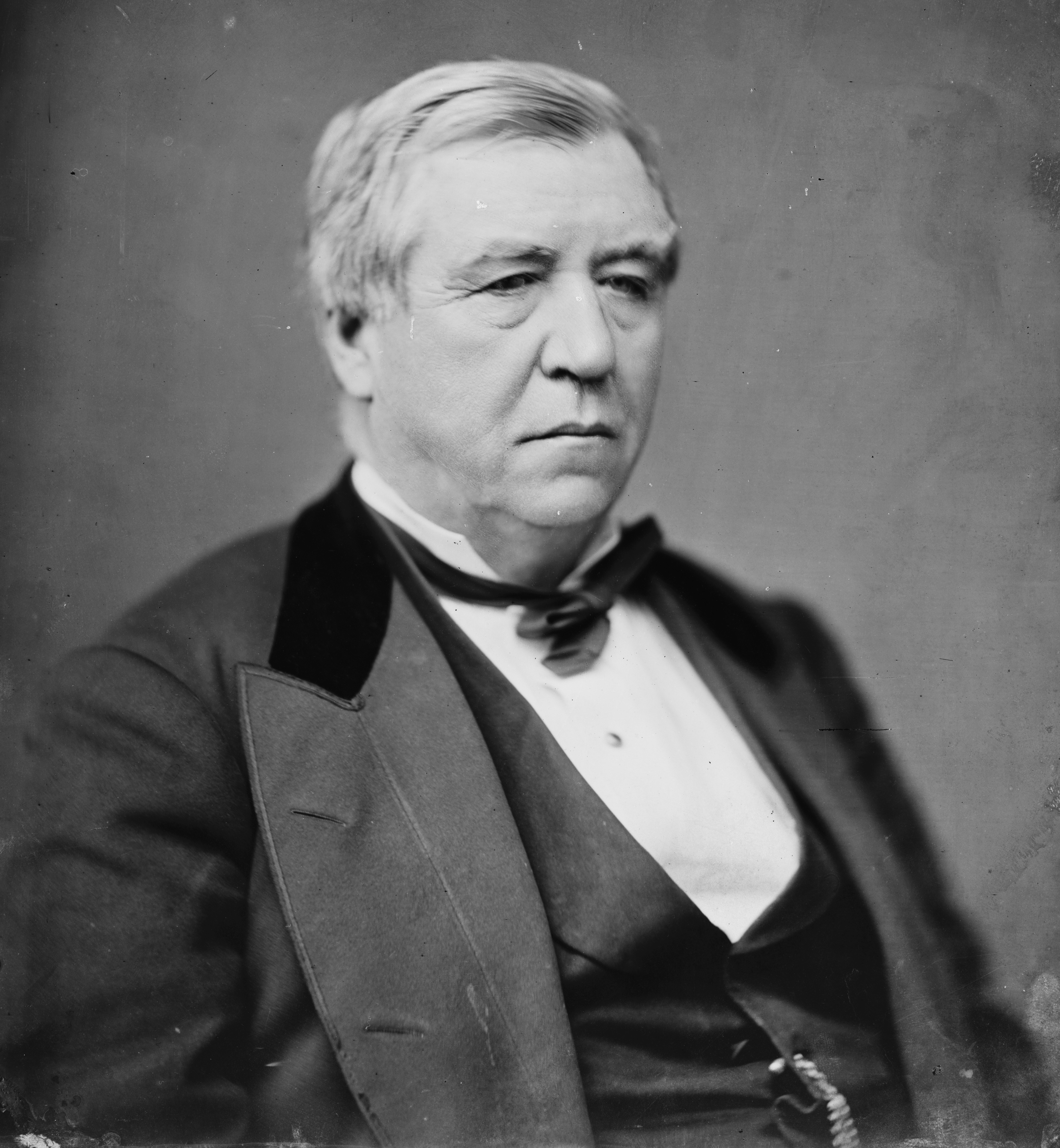
Senator
John W. Stevenson
of Kentucky

Benjamin G. Brown received 713 of the 732 delegate votes cast on the first ballot.

Vice Presidential Ballot
	1st
Brown	713
Stevenson	6
Not Voting	13

Source: Official proceedings of the National Democratic convention, held at Baltimore, July 9, 1872. (September 3, 2012).

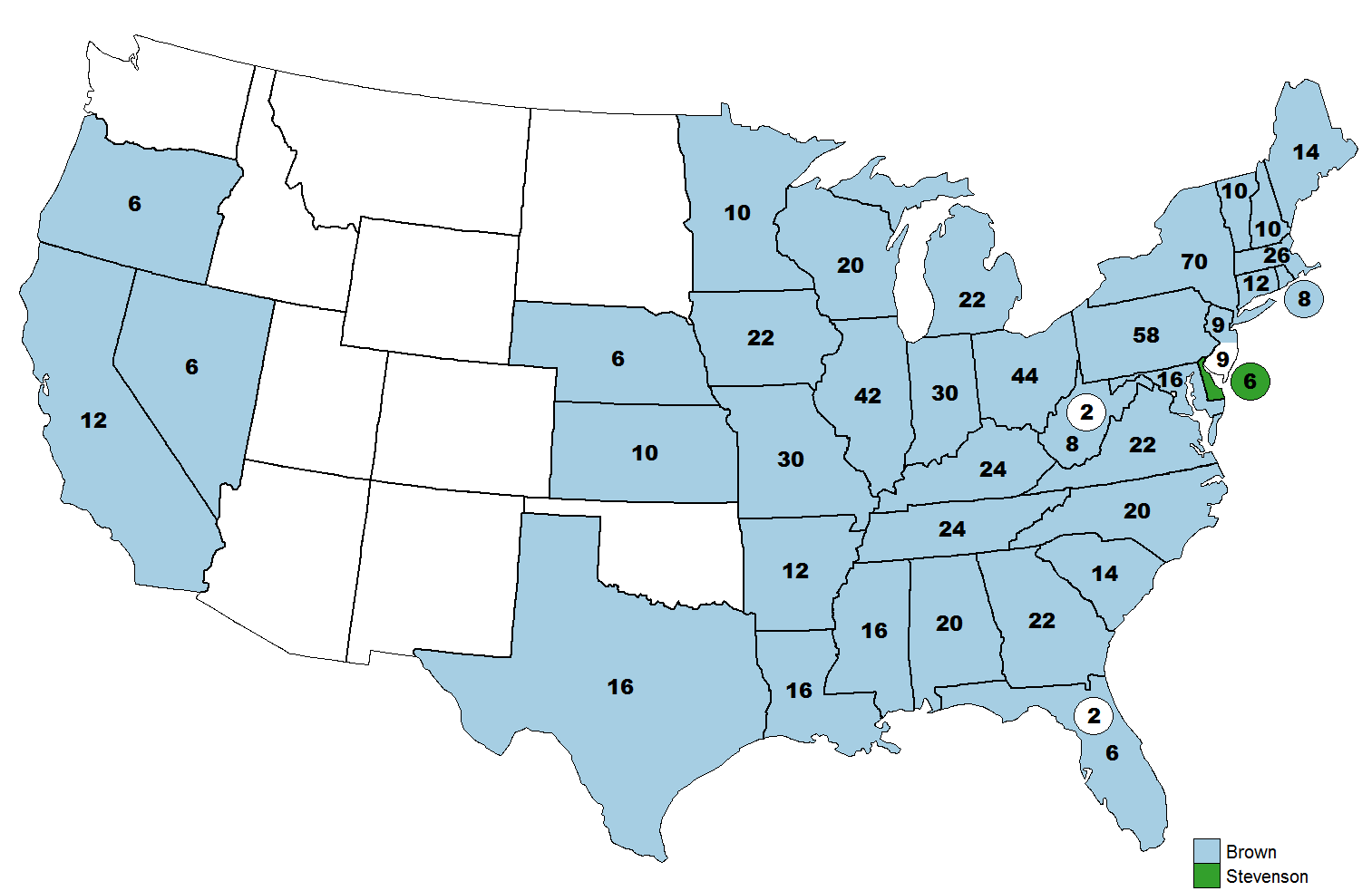
1st Vice Presidential Ballot

== Straight-Out Democrats Convention ==
A splinter, conservative group of Democrats broke off due to their dissatisfaction with the nomination of Greeley.

Calling themselves the Straight-Out Democrats, they held a Straight-Out Democratic National Convention in Louisville, Kentucky. They nominated for President Charles O'Conor, who told them by telegram that he would not accept their nomination, and John Quincy Adams II for vice president. The candidates received 23,054 votes (0.35%) in the election, and no Electoral College electors.

== See also ==
- History of the United States Democratic Party
- History of Baltimore
- U.S. presidential nomination convention
- 1872 United States presidential election
- List of Democratic National Conventions
- 1872 Liberal Republican convention
- 1872 Republican National Convention
- Ulysses S. Grant

Preceded by 1868; New York, New York	Democratic National Conventions	Succeeded by 1876; St. Louis, Missouri
