= Ward Blanton =

American scholar

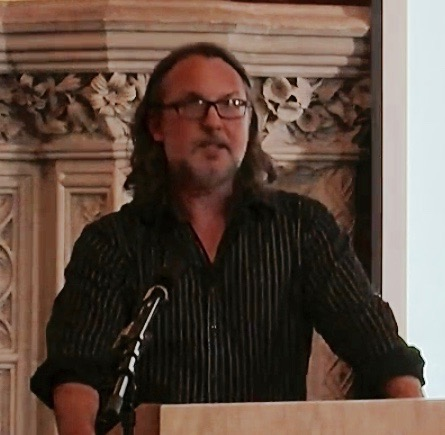

Academic background
- Education: Yale University (PhD)
- Thesis: Apocalyptic transmissions: images of early Christianity in the construction of modern critical identity (2004)
- Doctoral advisor: Dale Martin

Academic work
- Discipline: Religious studies
- Sub-discipline: biblical studies; philosophy of religion; critical thought; Saint Paul

Ward Blanton is an American scholar. He is known for his research on biblical studies and philosophy of religion.

Ward Blanton studied at Yale University where he earned his Ph.D. with the dissertation Apocalyptic transmissions: images of early Christianity in the construction of modern critical identity in 2004 under the supervision of Dale Martin. He is also the supervisor of Fatima Tofighi's Ph.

== Books ==
- An Insurrectionist Manifesto: Four New Gospels for a Radical Politics, with Clayton Crockett, Jeffrey W. Robbins, and Noëlle Vahanian, Columbia University Press, 2016
- A Materialism for the Masses: Saint Paul and the Philosophy of Undying Life, Columbia University Press, 2014
- Displacing Christian Origins: Philosophy, Secularity, and the New Testament, University of Chicago Press, 2007
- Paul and the Philosophers, edited with Hent de Vries, Fordham University Press, 2013
