= William W. Blanton =

American politician (1924–2014)

Member of the Texas House of Representatives
- In office 1977–1987

Personal details
- Born: William Wallace Blanton; March 11, 1924 Shawnee Mission, Kansas, U.S.
- Died: April 4, 2014 (aged 90) Carrollton, Texas, U.S.
- Party: Republican
- Relatives: Jack C.F. Blanton (brother)
- Occupation: Politician, businessman

Military service
- Allegiance: United States
- Branch/service: United States Army (United States Army Air Forces)
- Battles/wars: World War II

William Wallace "Bill" Blanton (March 11, 1924 – April 4, 2014) was an American politician and businessman.

Born in Shawnee Mission, Kansas, Blanton and his family moved to Carrollton, Texas, where his father ran a mill. During World War II, Blanton served as a pilot in the United States Army Air Forces. Blanton and his wife owned Schlotzsky Sandwiches Shops. Blanton served on the Carrollton-Farmers Branch school board. From 1977 to 1987, Blanton served as a Republican in the Texas House of Representatives. His brother Jack C.F. Blanton also served in the Texas Legislature. Blanton died in Carrollton, Texas.
