= Jack C.F. Blanton =

American politician, businessman, and newspaper editor

Member of the Texas House of Representatives
- In office 1969–1973

Mayor of Carrollton, Texas
- In office 1946–1948

Personal details
- Born: Chester Franklin Blanton; January 29, 1921 Shawnee, Kansas, U.S.
- Died: October 12, 2002 (aged 81) Dallas, Texas, U.S.
- Party: Democratic
- Relatives: William W. Blanton (brother)
- Education: Southern Methodist University
- Occupation: Politician, businessman, newspaper editor

Chester Franklin "Jack" Blanton (January 29, 1921 – October 12, 2002) was an American politician, businessman, and newspaper editor.

Born in Shawnee, Kansas, Blanton moved with his family to Carrollton, Texas, where his family owned a grain mill. During World War II, he helped build airfields. He received his bachelor's degree from Southern Methodist University in 1955. He was a newspaper editor and president of a bank. He served as Mayor of Carrollton, Texas from 1946 to 1948. Then, Blanton served in the Texas House of Representatives from 1969 to 1973 as a Democrat. His brother William W. Blanton also served in the Texas Legislature. Blanton died in Dallas, Texas.
