= Blanton Duncan =

American army officer

- Born: July 2, 1827; Louisville, Kentucky, U.S.
- Died: April 8, 1902 (aged 74)
- Burial place: Cave Hill Cemetery; Louisville, Kentucky, U.S.
- Relatives: William Garnett Duncan (father)
- Military career
- Commands: 1st Kentucky Infantry Regiment
- Conflicts: American Civil War

Blanton Duncan (July 2, 1827 – April 8, 1902) was an American landholder, printer, political organizer, and Confederate Army officer.

Blanton was born in Louisville, Kentucky. His father was U.S. congressman Garnett Duncan who organized support for Charles O'Conor instead of Horace Greeley.

He was an officer in the 1st Kentucky Infantry Regiment. A wealthy heir, he equipped a regiment. According to a numismatic site he was relieved of command by soldiers serving under him and sued his daughter over items she inherited from her mother. He had a contract to print Confederate money but later had it revoked. The Metropolitan Museum of Art in New York City has a five dollar bill he printed.

After the war he spent some time in Europe. He moved to Texas and then California where he owned a ranch. The Manhattan Beach Historical Society wrote about his property and history in the area.

He had one daughter. He is buried at the Cave Hill Cemetery in Louisville. The University of West Virginia has a collection of some of his Civil War era letters.
