= 1872 United States presidential election in Ohio =

- November 5, 1872

Nominee	Ulysses S. Grant	Horace Greeley
Party	Republican	Liberal Republican
Home state	Illinois	New York
Running mate	Henry Wilson	B. Gratz Brown
Electoral vote	22	0
Popular vote	281,852	244,321
Percentage	53.24%	46.15%
County results
Grant
40-50%
50–60%
60–70%
70–80%
80–90%
Greeley
50–60%
60–70%
President before election
Ulysses S. Grant
Republican
Elected President
Ulysses S. Grant
Republican

The 1872 United States presidential election in Ohio was held on November 5, 1872, as part of the 1872 United States presidential election. State voters chose 22 electors to the Electoral College, who voted for president and vice president.

Ohio was won by the Republican Party candidate, incumbent president and Ohio native Ulysses S. Grant, who won the state with 53.24% of the popular vote. The Democratic and Liberal Republican Party candidate, Horace Greeley, garnered 46.15% of the popular vote.

Seeing as it was unlikely they could pull off a victory in the general election, the Democratic Party endorsed the Liberal Republican candidate Horace Greeley, who had been involved in a split from the traditional Republican Party. A New Yorker, Greeley had been nominated in Cincinnati, Ohio, at the 1872 Liberal Republican convention.

The other two candidates who garnered votes in Ohio during the election were James Black, a member of the Prohibition Party, and Charles O'Conor, a straight-out Democrat. Black and the prohibitionists were dedicated to the outlaw of alcohol, while O’Conor and the straight-out Democrats ran dissatisfied with the Democratic nomination of Greeley.

== Results ==
1872 United States presidential election in Ohio
Party	Candidate	Votes	Percentage	Electoral votes
Republican	Ulysses S. Grant (incumbent)	281,852	53.24%	22
Liberal Republican	Horace Greeley	244,321	46.15%	0
Prohibition	James Black	2,100	0.40%	0
Straight-Out Democratic	Charles O'Conor	1,163	0.22%	0
Totals		529,436	100.0%	22

=== Results by county ===
County	Ulysses S. Grant Republican		Horace Greeley Liberal Republican		Various candidates Other parties		Margin		Total votes cast
County	#	%	#	%	#	%	#	%	Total votes cast
Adams	1,877	48.63%	1,972	51.09%	11	0.28%	-95	-2.46%	3,860
Allen	2,010	44.61%	2,463	54.66%	33	0.73%	-453	-10.05%	4,506
Ashland	2,183	47.60%	2,368	51.64%	35	0.76%	-185	-4.03%	4,586
Ashtabula	5,764	76.96%	1,678	22.40%	48	0.64%	4,086	54.55%	7,490
Athens	3,025	67.64%	1,398	31.26%	49	1.10%	1,627	21.48%	4,472
Auglaize	1,180	31.12%	2,535	66.85%	77	2.03%	-1,355	-35.73%	3,792
Belmont	4,267	53.77%	3,647	45.96%	22	0.28%	620	7.81%	7,936
Brown	2,593	43.64%	3,337	56.16%	12	0.20%	-744	-12.52%	5,942
Butler	2,993	37.55%	4,926	61.80%	52	0.65%	-1,933	-24.25%	7,971
Carroll	1,817	58.61%	1,283	41.39%	0	0.00%	534	17.23%	3,100
Champaign	3,059	58.08%	2,185	41.48%	23	0.44%	874	16.59%	5,267
Clark	4,095	60.80%	2,612	38.78%	28	0.42%	1,483	22.02%	6,735
Clermont	3,408	48.20%	3,658	51.73%	5	0.07%	-250	-3.54%	7,071
Clinton	3,105	62.65%	1,786	36.04%	65	1.31%	1,319	26.61%	4,956
Columbiana	4,773	61.78%	2,897	37.50%	56	0.72%	1,876	24.28%	7,726
Coshocton	2,252	45.68%	2,656	53.87%	22	0.45%	-404	-8.19%	4,930
Crawford	2,081	36.36%	3,595	62.81%	48	0.84%	-1,514	-26.45%	5,724
Cuyahoga	14,451	63.75%	8,033	35.44%	184	0.81%	6,418	28.31%	22,668
Darke	3,069	52.35%	2,760	47.07%	34	0.58%	309	5.27%	5,863
Defiance	1,093	38.31%	1,720	60.29%	40	1.40%	-627	-21.98%	2,853
Delaware	2,713	54.72%	2,013	40.60%	232	4.68%	700	14.12%	4,958
Erie	2,905	55.75%	2,287	43.89%	19	0.36%	618	11.86%	5,211
Fairfield	2,540	39.40%	3,888	60.31%	19	0.29%	-1,348	-20.91%	6,447
Fayette	2,140	57.88%	1,545	41.79%	12	0.32%	595	16.09%	3,697
Franklin	5,796	43.92%	7,345	55.66%	56	0.42%	-1,549	-11.74%	13,197
Fulton	2,210	71.57%	826	26.75%	52	1.68%	1,384	44.82%	3,088
Gallia	2,855	64.39%	1,554	35.05%	25	0.56%	1,301	29.34%	4,434
Geauga	2,711	81.66%	600	18.07%	9	0.27%	2,111	63.58%	3,320
Greene	4,069	66.63%	1,961	32.11%	77	1.26%	2,108	34.52%	6,107
Guernsey	2,629	57.78%	1,901	41.78%	20	0.44%	728	16.00%	4,550
Hamilton	20,083	44.60%	24,941	55.39%	1	0.00%	-4,858	-10.79%	45,025
Hancock	2,311	48.52%	2,449	51.42%	3	0.06%	-138	-2.90%	4,763
Hardin	2,238	53.08%	1,970	46.73%	8	0.19%	268	6.36%	4,216
Harrison	2,303	57.36%	1,695	42.22%	17	0.42%	608	15.14%	4,015
Henry	1,160	42.76%	1,510	55.66%	43	1.58%	-350	-12.90%	2,713
Highland	3,171	51.91%	2,933	48.01%	5	0.08%	238	3.90%	6,109
Hocking	1,350	41.69%	1,860	57.44%	28	0.86%	-510	-15.75%	3,238
Holmes	1,089	30.08%	2,530	69.89%	1	0.03%	-1,441	-39.81%	3,620
Huron	3,812	62.82%	2,182	35.96%	74	1.22%	1,630	26.86%	6,065
Jackson	2,258	58.83%	1,555	40.52%	25	0.65%	703	18.32%	3,838
Jefferson	3,776	63.78%	2,102	35.51%	42	0.71%	1,674	28.28%	5,920
Knox	2,773	49.44%	2,730	48.67%	106	1.89%	43	0.77%	5,609
Lake	2,751	73.56%	979	26.18%	10	0.27%	1,772	47.38%	3,740
Lawrence	3,624	68.17%	1,637	30.79%	55	1.03%	1,987	37.38%	5,316
Licking	3,493	43.01%	4,562	56.17%	67	0.82%	-1,069	-13.16%	8,122
Logan	2,795	58.74%	1,955	41.09%	8	0.17%	840	17.65%	4,758
Lorain	4,432	67.71%	2,097	32.03%	17	0.26%	2,335	35.67%	6,546
Lucas	5,253	62.66%	3,083	36.77%	48	0.57%	2,170	25.88%	8,384
Madison	1,934	54.25%	1,625	45.58%	6	0.17%	309	8.67%	3,565
Mahoning	3,757	59.13%	2,518	39.63%	79	1.24%	1,239	19.50%	6,354
Marion	1,340	41.42%	1,842	56.94%	53	1.64%	-502	-15.52%	3,235
Medina	2,794	61.80%	1,695	37.49%	32	0.71%	1,099	24.31%	4,521
Meigs	3,501	65.81%	1,812	34.06%	7	0.13%	1,689	31.75%	5,320
Mercer	1,026	32.65%	2,090	66.52%	26	0.83%	-1,064	-33.86%	3,142
Miami	3,753	56.03%	2,910	43.45%	35	0.52%	843	12.59%	6,698
Monroe	1,307	30.74%	2,878	67.69%	67	1.58%	-1,571	-36.95%	4,252
Montgomery	6,998	49.17%	7,183	50.47%	50	0.35%	-185	-1.30%	14,231
Morgan	2,339	58.23%	1,551	38.61%	127	3.16%	788	19.62%	4,017
Morrow	2,197	55.85%	1,689	42.93%	48	1.22%	508	12.91%	3,934
Muskingum	4,558	51.28%	4,304	48.42%	27	0.30%	254	2.86%	8,889
Noble	2,016	54.78%	1,627	44.21%	37	1.01%	389	10.57%	3,680
Ottawa	1,122	43.66%	1,439	55.99%	9	0.35%	-317	-12.33%	2,570
Paulding	979	60.32%	637	39.25%	7	0.43%	342	21.07%	1,623
Perry	1,907	46.67%	2,172	53.16%	7	0.17%	-265	-6.49%	4,086
Pickaway	2,353	46.59%	2,660	52.67%	37	0.73%	-307	-6.08%	5,050
Pike	1,284	45.01%	1,568	54.96%	1	0.04%	-284	-9.95%	2,853
Portage	3,478	58.03%	2,438	40.68%	77	1.28%	1,040	17.35%	5,993
Preble	2,715	56.14%	2,101	43.44%	20	0.41%	614	12.70%	4,836
Putnam	1,275	37.22%	2,131	62.20%	20	0.58%	-856	-24.99%	3,426
Richland	3,369	47.05%	3,772	52.67%	20	0.28%	-403	-5.63%	7,161
Ross	3,650	49.55%	3,711	50.38%	5	0.07%	-61	-0.83%	7,366
Sandusky	2,380	46.26%	2,729	53.04%	36	0.70%	-349	-6.78%	5,145
Scioto	2,888	57.53%	2,091	41.65%	41	0.82%	797	15.88%	5,020
Seneca	3,128	47.12%	3,462	52.15%	48	0.72%	-334	-5.03%	6,638
Shelby	1,717	42.44%	2,311	57.12%	18	0.44%	-594	-14.68%	4,046
Stark	5,817	52.30%	5,250	47.20%	55	0.49%	567	5.10%	11,122
Summit	4,534	62.01%	2,738	37.45%	40	0.55%	1,796	24.56%	7,312
Trumbull	5,869	70.68%	2,321	27.95%	114	1.37%	3,548	42.73%	8,304
Tuscarawas	3,178	46.96%	3,586	52.99%	3	0.04%	-408	-6.03%	6,767
Union	2,450	60.91%	1,564	38.89%	8	0.20%	886	22.03%	4,022
Van Wert	1,805	51.62%	1,686	48.21%	6	0.17%	119	3.40%	3,497
Vinton	1,314	49.31%	1,340	50.28%	11	0.41%	-26	-0.98%	2,665
Warren	3,763	63.38%	2,168	36.52%	6	0.10%	1,595	26.87%	5,937
Washington	4,231	53.27%	3,680	46.33%	32	0.40%	551	6.94%	7,943
Wayne	3,768	51.53%	3,533	48.32%	11	0.15%	235	3.21%	7,312
Williams	2,213	59.84%	1,419	38.37%	66	1.78%	794	21.47%	3,698
Wood	2,994	60.95%	1,896	38.60%	22	0.45%	1,098	22.35%	4,912
Wyandot	1,816	46.13%	2,095	53.21%	26	0.66%	-279	-7.09%	3,937
Totals	281,852	53.24%	244,321	46.15%	3,263	0.62%	37,531	7.07%	529,436

== See also ==
- United States presidential elections in Ohio
