= 1872 United States presidential election in New York =

- November 5, 1872
- Turnout: 80.5% ▼11.2 pp
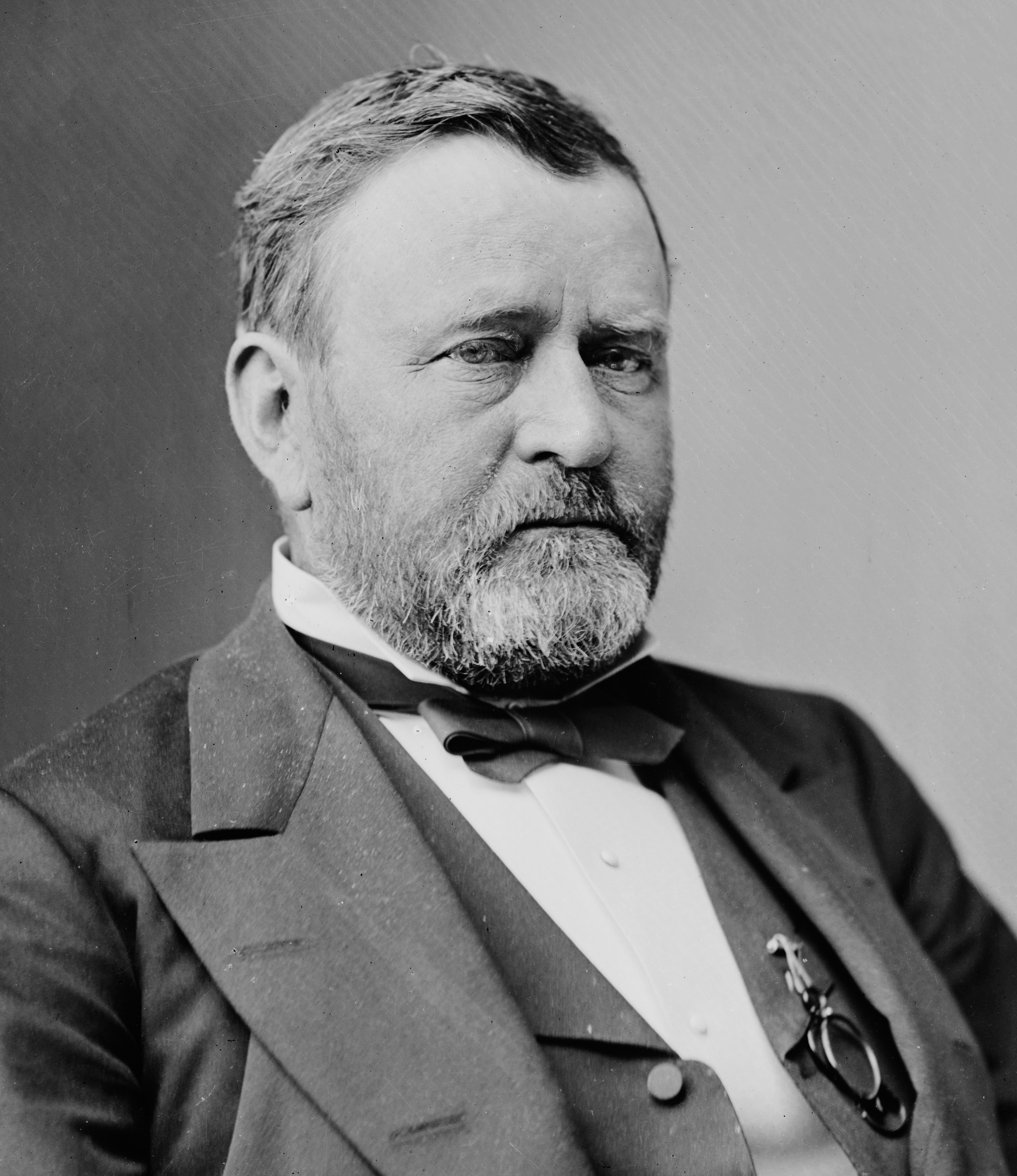

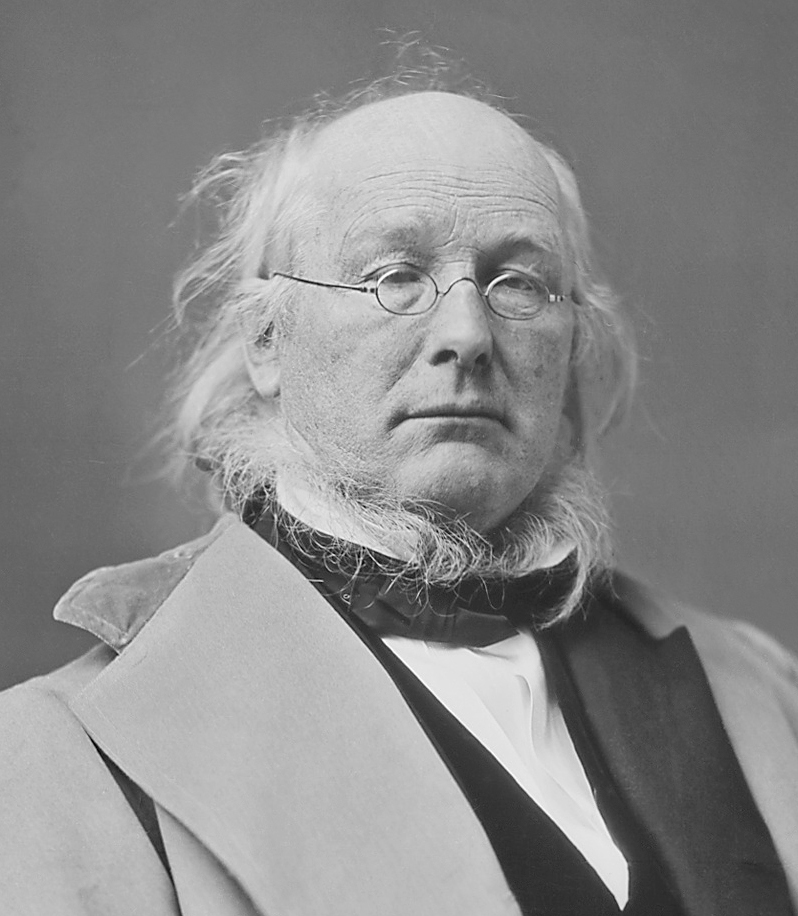
| Nominee | Ulysses S. Grant | Horace Greeley |
| Party | Republican | Liberal Republican |
| Home state | Illinois | New York |
| Running mate | Henry Wilson | Benjamin G. Brown |
| Electoral vote | 35 | 0 |
| Popular vote | 440,759 | 387,279 |
| Percentage | 53.12% | 46.68% |
County results
Grant
40–50%
50–60%
60–70%
70–80%
Greeley
50–60%
President before election
Ulysses S. Grant
Republican
Elected President
Ulysses S. Grant
Republican

The 1872 United States presidential election in New York took place on November 5, 1872. All contemporary 37 states were part of the 1872 United States presidential election. Voters chose 35 electors to the Electoral College, which selected the president and vice president.

New York was won by the Republican nominees, incumbent President Ulysses S. Grant of Illinois and his running mate Senator Henry Wilson of Massachusetts. Grant and Wilson defeated the Liberal Republican and Democratic nominees, former Congressman Horace Greeley of New York and his running mate former Senator and Governor Benjamin Gratz Brown of Missouri.

Grant carried New York State with 53.12% of the vote to Greeley's 46.68%, a victory margin of 6.45%. New York weighed in for this election as slightly more than 5% more Democratic/Liberal Republican than the national average. Dutchess County would not vote Democratic again until 1964.

Grant dominated much of upstate New York and also won some counties downstate in the New York City area, including Richmond County, Queens County, and Suffolk County. Greeley, however, did win New York City and Kings County. Greeley also won nearby Westchester County and Rockland County, along with a handful of rural upstate counties.

== Results ==
1872 United States presidential election in New York (Note: Since New York voted for presidential electors directly, the totals below are based on the highest elector on each ticket.)
| Party | Candidate | Running mate | Popular vote | | Electoral vote | |
| Party | Candidate | Running mate | Count | % | Count | % |
|---|---|---|---|---|---|---|
| Republican | Ulysses S. Grant of Illinois | Henry Wilson of Massachusetts | 440,759 | 53.12% | 35 | 100.00% |
| Liberal Republican | Horace Greeley of New York | Benjamin G. Brown of Missouri | 387,279 | 46.68% | 0 | 0.00% |
| Straight-Out Democratic | Charles O'Conor of New York | John Quincy Adams II of Massachusetts | 1,454 | 0.18% | 0 | 0.00% |
| Prohibition | James Black of Pennsylvania | John Russell of Michigan | 201 | 0.02% | 0 | 0.00% |
| Total | | | 829,693 | 100.00% | 35 | 100.00% |

=== Results by county ===
| County | Ulysses S. Grant Republican | | Horace Greeley Liberal Republican | | Charles O'Conor Straight-Out Democratic | | James Black Prohibition | | Margin | | Total votes cast |
| County | # | % | # | % | # | % | # | % | # | % | Total votes cast |
|---|---|---|---|---|---|---|---|---|---|---|---|
| Albany | 14,415 | 51.07% | 13,793 | 48.87% | 16 | 0.06% | 0 | 0.00% | 622 | 2.20% | 28,224 |
| Allegany | 6,150 | 67.07% | 2,981 | 32.51% | 38 | 0.41% | 0 | 0.00% | 3,169 | 34.56% | 9,169 |
| Broome | 5,719 | 56.88% | 4,322 | 42.99% | 13 | 0.13% | 0 | 0.00% | 1,397 | 13.89% | 10,054 |
| Cattaraugus | 5,614 | 60.40% | 3,606 | 38.80% | 75 | 0.81% | 0 | 0.00% | 2,008 | 21.60% | 9,295 |
| Cayuga | 7,994 | 62.35% | 4,782 | 37.30% | 40 | 0.31% | 6 | 0.05% | 3,212 | 25.05% | 12,822 |
| Chautauqua | 8,144 | 62.07% | 4,880 | 37.20% | 96 | 0.73% | 0 | 0.00% | 3,264 | 24.88% | 13,120 |
| Chemung | 4,350 | 53.81% | 3,728 | 46.12% | 6 | 0.07% | 0 | 0.00% | 622 | 7.69% | 8,084 |
| Chenango | 5,575 | 56.44% | 4,280 | 43.33% | 12 | 0.12% | 10 | 0.10% | 1,295 | 13.11% | 9,877 |
| Clinton | 4,566 | 52.77% | 4,085 | 47.21% | 2 | 0.02% | 0 | 0.00% | 481 | 5.56% | 8,653 |
| Columbia | 5,462 | 47.42% | 6,047 | 52.50% | 10 | 0.09% | 0 | 0.00% | -585 | -5.08% | 11,519 |
| Cortland | 3,576 | 60.30% | 2,347 | 39.58% | 4 | 0.07% | 3 | 0.05% | 1,229 | 20.73% | 5,930 |
| Delaware | 5,351 | 55.10% | 4,338 | 44.67% | 23 | 0.24% | 0 | 0.00% | 1,013 | 10.43% | 9,712 |
| Dutchess | 8,235 | 48.62% | 8,636 | 50.98% | 18 | 0.11% | 50 | 0.30% | -401 | -2.37% | 16,939 |
| Erie | 17,831 | 58.74% | 12,467 | 41.07% | 58 | 0.19% | 0 | 0.00% | 5,364 | 17.67% | 30,356 |
| Essex | 3,728 | 65.78% | 1,939 | 34.22% | 0 | 0.00% | 0 | 0.00% | 1,789 | 31.57% | 5,667 |
| Franklin | 3,371 | 61.79% | 2,076 | 38.05% | 9 | 0.16% | 0 | 0.00% | 1,295 | 23.74% | 5,456 |
| Fulton | 3,551 | 54.48% | 2,927 | 44.91% | 18 | 0.28% | 22 | 0.34% | 624 | 9.57% | 6,518 |
| Genesee | 4,044 | 60.89% | 2,590 | 38.99% | 8 | 0.12% | 0 | 0.00% | 1,454 | 21.89% | 6,642 |
| Greene | 3,440 | 47.84% | 3,704 | 51.51% | 47 | 0.65% | 0 | 0.00% | -264 | -3.67% | 7,191 |
| Hamilton (Note: Voted with Fulton County) | 353 | 41.78% | 492 | 58.22% | 0 | 0.00% | 0 | 0.00% | -139 | -16.45% | 845 |
| Herkimer | 5,515 | 57.45% | 4,066 | 42.35% | 19 | 0.20% | 0 | 0.00% | 1,449 | 15.09% | 9,600 |
| Jefferson | 8,481 | 59.47% | 5,769 | 40.46% | 10 | 0.07% | 0 | 0.00% | 2.712 | 19.02% | 14,260 |
| Kings | 33,368 | 46.68% | 38,108 | 53.31% | 10 | 0.01% | 0 | 0.00% | -4,740 | -6.63% | 71,486 |
| Lewis | 3,402 | 52.82% | 3,033 | 47.09% | 6 | 0.09% | 0 | 0.00% | 369 | 5.73% | 6,441 |
| Livingston | 4,753 | 58.59% | 3,350 | 41.30% | 9 | 0.11% | 0 | 0.00% | 1,403 | 17.30% | 8,112 |
| Madison | 6,096 | 60.98% | 3,898 | 38.99% | 3 | 0.03% | 0 | 0.00% | 2,198 | 21.99% | 9,997 |
| Monroe | 13,033 | 58.44% | 9,261 | 41.52% | 9 | 0.04% | 0 | 0.00% | 3,772 | 16.91% | 22,303 |
| Montgomery | 4,113 | 52.28% | 3,742 | 47.56% | 13 | 0.17% | 0 | 0.00% | 371 | 4.72% | 7,868 |
| New York | 54,676 | 41.27% | 77,814 | 58.73% | 0 | 0.00% | 0 | 0.00% | -23,138 | -17.46% | 132,490 |
| Niagara | 5,404 | 54.99% | 4,396 | 44.73% | 27 | 0.27% | 0 | 0.00% | 1,008 | 10.26% | 9,827 |
| Oneida | 13,384 | 56.95% | 10,078 | 42.88% | 33 | 0.14% | 7 | 0.03% | 3,306 | 14.07% | 23,502 |
| Onondaga | 12,708 | 56.50% | 9,749 | 43.34% | 4 | 0.02% | 33 | 0.15% | 2,959 | 13.15% | 22,494 |
| Ontario | 5,578 | 57.83% | 4,047 | 41.96% | 6 | 0.06% | 15 | 0.16% | 1,531 | 15.87% | 9,646 |
| Orange | 8,471 | 52.23% | 7,712 | 47.55% | 36 | 0.22% | 0 | 0.00% | 759 | 4.68% | 16,219 |
| Orleans | 3,857 | 61.64% | 2,391 | 38.21% | 9 | 0.14% | 0 | 0.00% | 1,466 | 23.43% | 6,257 |
| Oswego | 9,559 | 59.69% | 6,443 | 40.23% | 1 | 0.01% | 12 | 0.07% | 3,116 | 19.46% | 16,015 |
| Otsego | 6,236 | 49.78% | 6,275 | 50.10% | 15 | 0.12% | 0 | 0.00% | -39 | -0.31% | 12,526 |
| Putnam | 1,706 | 56.06% | 1,337 | 43.94% | 0 | 0.00% | 0 | 0.00% | 369 | 12.13% | 3,043 |
| Queens | 6,082 | 51.74% | 5,655 | 48.10% | 19 | 0.16% | 0 | 0.00% | 427 | 3.63% | 11,756 |
| Rensselaer | 11,937 | 57.71% | 8,671 | 41.92% | 77 | 0.37% | 0 | 0.00% | 3,266 | 15.79% | 20,685 |
| Richmond | 2,728 | 51.42% | 2,541 | 47.90% | 36 | 0.68% | 0 | 0.00% | 187 | 3.52% | 5,305 |
| Rockland | 2,220 | 47.59% | 2,432 | 52.13% | 13 | 0.28% | 0 | 0.00% | -212 | -4.54% | 4,665 |
| Saratoga | 6,955 | 59.37% | 4,734 | 40.41% | 25 | 0.21% | 0 | 0.00% | 2,221 | 18.96% | 11,714 |
| Schenectady | 2,809 | 55.04% | 2,242 | 43.93% | 53 | 1.04% | 0 | 0.00% | 567 | 11.11% | 5,104 |
| Schoharie | 3,284 | 43.90% | 4,196 | 56.10% | 0 | 0.00% | 0 | 0.00% | -912 | -12.19% | 7,480 |
| Schuyler | 2,478 | 54.96% | 1,996 | 44.27% | 27 | 0.60% | 8 | 0.18% | 482 | 10.69% | 4,509 |
| Seneca | 2,903 | 49.89% | 2,870 | 49.32% | 46 | 0.79% | 0 | 0.00% | 33 | 0.57% | 5,819 |
| St. Lawrence | 11,331 | 71.70% | 4,395 | 27.81% | 75 | 0.47% | 3 | 0.02% | 6,936 | 43.89% | 15,804 |
| Steuben | 8,551 | 55.09% | 6,940 | 44.71% | 32 | 0.21% | 0 | 0.00% | 1,611 | 10.38% | 15,523 |
| Suffolk | 4,838 | 59.77% | 3,160 | 39.04% | 96 | 1.19% | 0 | 0.00% | 1,678 | 20.73% | 8,094 |
| Sullivan | 3,260 | 51.03% | 3,061 | 47.92% | 67 | 1.05% | 0 | 0.00% | 199 | 3.12% | 6,388 |
| Tioga | 4,081 | 55.80% | 3,211 | 43.91% | 19 | 0.26% | 2 | 0.03% | 870 | 11.90% | 7,313 |
| Tompkins | 4,318 | 55.70% | 3,369 | 43.46% | 36 | 0.46% | 29 | 0.37% | 949 | 12.24% | 7,752 |
| Ulster | 8,672 | 52.72% | 7,760 | 47.17% | 18 | 0.11% | 0 | 0.00% | 912 | 5.54% | 16,450 |
| Warren | 2,901 | 61.55% | 1,803 | 38.26% | 9 | 0.19% | 0 | 0.00% | 1,098 | 23.30% | 4,713 |
| Washington | 6,535 | 63.33% | 3,765 | 36.49% | 19 | 0.18% | 0 | 0.00% | 2,770 | 26.84% | 10,319 |
| Wayne | 6,164 | 62.05% | 3,768 | 37.93% | 2 | 0.02% | 0 | 0.00% | 2,396 | 24.12% | 9,934 |
| Westchester | 10,234 (Note: There is some uncertainly regarding the Republican vote in Westchester County. All sources agree that one Republican elector, Emil Sauer, certainly received 10,234 votes. But Sauer was not the elector on the Republican ticket to receive the most votes (in fact he received the second-fewest). The highest Republican elector was Stephen Sanford; his stated figure in Westchester County in 10,223. But the problem with this figure is that it results in Sanford's county by county votes not adding up to the statewide total. Using 10,234 does result in all the numbers aligning. In the 1873 Legislative Manual, the statewide summary lists 10,223 in Westchester despite two pages prior listing 10,234 on the county detail page.) | 47.94% | 11,112 | 52.05% | 3 | 0.01% | 0 | 0.00% | -878 | -4.11% | 21,349 |
| Wyoming | 3,909 | 62.65% | 2,301 | 36.88% | 28 | 0.45% | 1 | 0.02% | 1,608 | 25.77% | 6,239 |
| Yates | 2,760 | 59.75% | 1,808 | 39.14% | 51 | 1.10% | 0 | 0.00% | 952 | 20.61% | 4,619 |
| Totals | 440,759 | 53.12% | 387,279 | 46.68% | 1,454 | 0.18% | 201 | 0.02% | 53,480 | 6.45% | 829,693 |

==== Counties that flipped from Democratic to Republican ====
- Albany
- Putnam
- Queens
- Richmond
- Seneca
- Sullivan
- Ulster

==== Counties that flipped from Republican to Liberal Republican ====
- Dutchess
- Otsego

== See also ==
- United States presidential elections in New York
- Presidency of Ulysses S. Grant
