= 1872 United States presidential election in California =

- November 5, 1872

Nominee	Ulysses S. Grant	Horace Greeley
Party	Republican	Liberal Republican
Home state	Illinois	New York
Running mate	Henry Wilson	B. Gratz Brown
Electoral vote	6	0
Popular vote	51,181 (Note: Most votes won by an individual Grant elector)	39,060 (Note: Most votes won by an individual Greeley elector)
Percentage	56.00%	42.74%
County results
Grant
40–50%
50–60%
60–70%
70–80%
Greeley
40–50%
50–60%
60–70%
President before election
Ulysses S. Grant
Republican
Elected President
Ulysses S. Grant
Republican

The 1872 United States presidential election in California was held on November 5, 1872, as part of the 1872 United States presidential election. State voters chose six representatives, or electors, to the Electoral College, who voted for president and vice president. As was standard at the time, voters chose electors directly rather than simply voting for their party's candidate.

California voted for the Republican incumbent, Ulysses S. Grant, over the Liberal Republican nominee, New York Tribune publisher Horace Greeley.

== Results ==
General Election Results
Party	Pledged to	Elector	Votes
Republican Party	Ulysses S. Grant	C. Spreckles	51,181
Republican Party	Ulysses S. Grant	J. E. Hale	51,162
Republican Party	Ulysses S. Grant	J. O. Goodwin	51,157
Republican Party	Ulysses S. Grant	J. F. Miller	51,151
Republican Party	Ulysses S. Grant	J. B. Felton	51,149
Republican Party	Ulysses S. Grant	T. H. Rose	51,140
Liberal Republican Party	Horace Greeley	J. C. Shorb	39,060
Liberal Republican Party	Horace Greeley	Jo Hamilton	39,006
Liberal Republican Party	Horace Greeley	John Yule	38,972
Liberal Republican Party	Horace Greeley	F. M. Pixley	38,962
Liberal Republican Party	Horace Greeley	Peter Donahue	38,954
Liberal Republican Party	Horace Greeley	F. H. Rosenbaum	38,931
Straight-Out Democratic Party	Charles O'Conor	J. Mora Moss	920
Straight-Out Democratic Party	Charles O'Conor	Z. Montgomery	915
Straight-Out Democratic Party	Charles O'Conor	A. J. King	905
Straight-Out Democratic Party	Charles O'Conor	W. J. Graves	903
Straight-Out Democratic Party	Charles O'Conor	John Nugent	883
Straight-Out Democratic Party	Charles O'Conor	M. R. C. Pullen	880
Write-in		Scattering	226
Votes cast (Note: Based on totals for highest elector on each ticket)			91,387

=== Results by county ===
County	Ulysses S. Grant Republican		Horace Greeley Liberal Republican		Charles O'Conor Straight-Out Democratic		Scattering Write-in		Margin		Total votes cast (Note: Based on highest elector on each ticket)
County	#	%	#	%	#	%	#	%	#	%	Total votes cast
Alameda	2,564	67.21%	1,228	32.19%	23	0.60%	0	0.00%	1,336	35.02%	3,815
Alpine	89	64.49%	38	27.54%	11	7.97%	0	0.00%	51	36.96%	138
Amador	994	55.81%	766	43.01%	13	0.73%	8	0.45%	228	12.80%	1,781
Butte	1,204	56.95%	816	38.60%	90	4.26%	4	0.19%	388	18.35%	2,114
Calaveras	908	54.18%	751	44.81%	17	1.01%	0	0.00%	157	9.37%	1,676
Colusa	490	49.54%	499	50.46%	0	0.00%	0	0.00%	−9	−0.91%	989
Contra Costa	958	67.51%	461	32.49%	0	0.00%	0	0.00%	497	35.02%	1,419
Del Norte	169	54.87%	139	45.13%	0	0.00%	0	0.00%	30	9.74%	308
El Dorado	1,309	52.30%	1,093	43.67%	101	4.04%	0	0.00%	216	8.63%	2,503
Fresno	111	31.90%	237	68.10%	0	0.00%	0	0.00%	−126	−36.21%	348
Humboldt (Note: The returns from this county arrived too late to be included in the official canvass)	993	70.18%	403	28.48%	19	1.34%	0	0.00%	590	41.70%	1,415
Inyo	206	53.93%	176	46.07%	0	0.00%	0	0.00%	30	7.85%	382
Kern	175	38.04%	285	61.96%	0	0.00%	0	0.00%	−110	−23.91%	460
Klamath	83	40.49%	122	59.51%	0	0.00%	0	0.00%	−39	−19.02%	205
Lake	202	36.14%	355	63.51%	2	0.36%	0	0.00%	−153	−7.37%	559
Lassen	182	66.67%	91	33.33%	0	0.00%	0	0.00%	91	33.33%	273
Los Angeles	1,312	47.23%	1,229	44.24%	236	8.50%	1	0.04%	83	2.99%	2,778
Marin	600	66.52%	301	33.37%	1	0.11%	0	0.00%	299	33.15%	902
Mariposa	399	52.29%	364	47.71%	0	0.00%	0	0.00%	35	4.59%	763
Mendocino	662	45.28%	725	49.59%	69	4.72%	6	0.41%	−63	−4.31%	1,462
Merced	263	40.90%	380	59.10%	0	0.00%	0	0.00%	−117	−18.20%	643
Mono	88	63.77%	50	36.23%	0	0.00%	0	0.00%	38	27.54%	138
Monterey	1,154	53.62%	976	45.35%	22	1.02%	0	0.00%	178	8.27%	2,152
Napa	900	61.18%	552	37.53%	19	1.29%	0	0.00%	348	23.66%	1,471
Nevada	2,039	58.51%	1,437	41.23%	9	0.26%	0	0.00%	602	17.27%	3,485
Placer	1,416	62.24%	838	36.84%	11	0.48%	10	0.44%	578	25.41%	2,275
Plumas	512	64.65%	280	35.35%	0	0.00%	0	0.00%	232	29.29%	792
Sacramento	3,390	69.70%	1,469	30.20%	5	0.10%	0	0.00%	1,921	39.49%	4,864
San Bernardino (Note: The returns from this county arrived too late to be included in the official canvass)	318	53.74%	189	30.05%	102	16.22%	0	0.00%	149	23.69%	629
San Diego (Note: The returns from this county arrived too late to be included in the official canvass)	513	57.45%	360	40.31%	20	2.24%	0	0.00%	153	17.13%	893
San Francisco	11,811	51.02%	11,185	48.32%	0	0.00%	154	0.67%	626	2.70%	23,150
San Joaquin	1,784	57.40%	1,312	42.21%	12	0.39%	0	0.00%	472	15.19%	3,108
San Luis Obispo	461	55.01%	321	38.31%	56	6.68%	0	0.00%	140	16.71%	838
San Mateo	648	68.14%	303	31.86%	0	0.00%	0	0.00%	345	36.28%	951
Santa Barbara (Note: The returns from this county arrived too late to be included in the official canvass)	692	58.94%	482	41.06%	0	0.00%	0	0.00%	210	17.89%	1,174
Santa Clara	2,218	56.96%	1,670	42.89%	6	0.15%	0	0.00%	548	14.07%	3,894
Santa Cruz	1,029	66.99%	470	30.60%	37	2.41%	0	0.00%	559	36.39%	1,536
Shasta	539	62.38%	282	32.64%	43	4.98%	0	0.00%	257	29.75%	864
Sierra	925	71.21%	374	28.79%	0	0.00%	0	0.00%	551	42.42%	1,299
Siskiyou	709	51.68%	663	48.32%	0	0.00%	0	0.00%	46	3.35%	1,372
Solano	2,412	65.61%	1,257	34.19%	7	0.19%	0	0.00%	1,155	31.42%	3,676
Sonoma	1,703	50.24%	1,601	47.23%	46	1.36%	40	1.18%	102	3.01%	3,390
Stanislaus	464	41.06%	666	58.94%	0	0.00%	0	0.00%	−202	−17.88%	1,130
Sutter	495	62.50%	276	34.85%	19	2.40%	2	0.25%	219	27.65%	792
Tehama	400	62.60%	235	36.78%	4	0.63%	0	0.00%	165	25.82%	639
Trinity (Note: The returns from this county arrived too late to be included in the official canvass)	345	52.75%	307	46.94%	2	0.31%	0	0.00%	38	5.81%	654
Tulare	395	44.23%	498	55.77%	0	0.00%	0	0.00%	−103	−11.53%	893
Tuolumne	810	51.20%	726	45.89%	46	2.91%	0	0.00%	84	5.31%	1,582
Yolo	841	53.74%	711	45.43%	12	0.77%	1	0.06%	130	8.31%	1,565
Yuba	1,158	57.53%	852	42.32%	3	0.15%	0	0.00%	306	15.20%	2,013
Total (Note: Does not include the votes from Humboldt, San Bernardino, San Diego, Santa Barbara, and Trinity counties)	51,181	56.00%	39,060	42.74%	920	1.01%	226	0.25%	12,121	13.26%	91,387

==== Counties that flipped from Democratic to Republican ====
- Amador
- Del Norte
- El Dorado
- Los Angeles
- Mariposa
- Monterey
- San Bernardino
- San Diego
- San Francisco
- Santa Clara
- Siskiyou
- Sonoma
- Tehama
- Tuolumne
- Yolo

==== Counties that flipped from Democratic to Liberal Republican ====
- Colusa
- Fresno
- Kern
- Klamath
- Lake
- Mendocino
- Merced
- Shasta
- Stanislaus
- Tulare

== See also ==
- United States presidential elections in California
