= Thomas O'Connor (writer) =

Irish journalist, worked in United States (1770–1855)

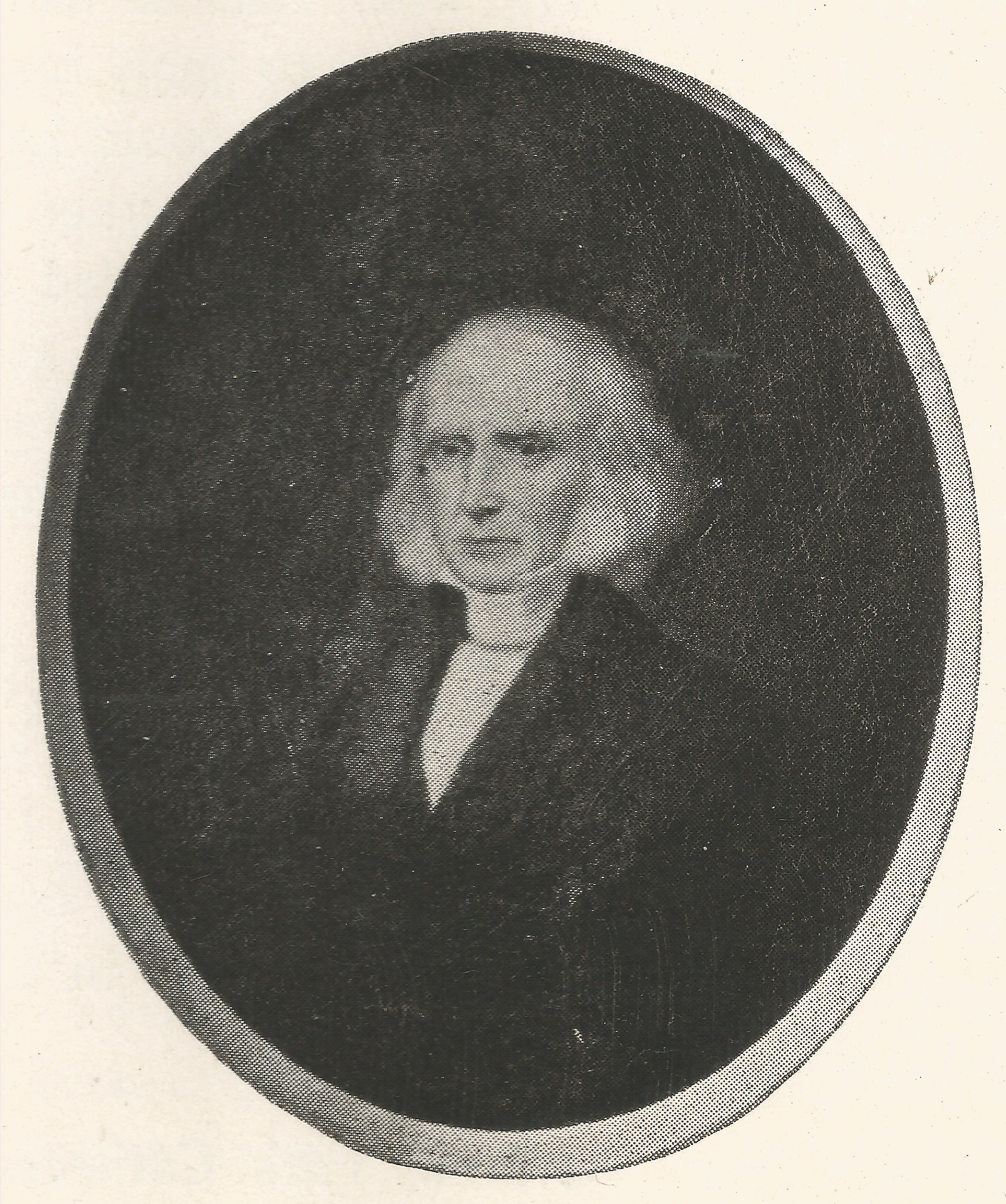
- Thomas O'Connor (O'Conor) contemporary portrait
- Born: September 1, 1770; Dublin, Ireland
- Died: February 9, 1855; Sands Point, New York, U.S.
- Occupations: Journalist; editor; writer
- Known for: Member of the United Irishmen; early Irish-American journalist; editor of the Military Monitor, Shamrock, and Globe
- Spouse: Margaret O’Connor (m. 1803; d. 1816)
- Children: Charles O'Conor; Eliza Margaret O’Conor
- Relatives: Charles O’Conor (father); Charles O’Conor Don (grandfather)

Thomas O'Connor (or O'Conor) (1 September 1770 in Dublin, Ireland – 9 February 1855 in Sands Point, New York) was an Irishman who in 1801 emigrated from County Roscommon, Ireland to New York where he devoted himself chiefly to journalism.

== Pedigree ==
Thomas O'Connor was the second son of Charles O'Conor (1736-1808) of Mount Allen and the grandson of the famed historian and antiquarian, Charles O'Conor O'Conor Don (Irish: Cathal Ó Conchubhair Donn) of Belanagare (1710-1791). The elder Charles wrote Dissertations on the ancient history of Ireland, as well as several other important historical works. This branch of the O'Conor family (O'Conor Don or Ó Conchubhair Donn in Irish) is one of Europe's most ancient, which has an unbroken line to A.D. 75, which includes Rory O'Conor or Ruaidrí Ua Conchobair (d. 1198) last High King of Ireland.

== Biography ==
Thomas was a member of the United Irishmen, he took the oath from Wolfe Tone. O'Connor was actively involved in the Irish Rebellion of 1798, the failure of this revolutionary attempt of that year caused him to leave his native land. He emigrated to New York City in 1801 where he found among the residents of that city, one Hugh O’Connor and his family. Hugh O’Connor (a fellow countryman but not a relative) with his family, emigrated in 1790 or not long previously from Sligo, Ireland. Thomas and Margaret (a daughter of Hugh O’Connor) were married in 1803. They had two children as a result of the marriage, both were born in New York City: Charles O’Conor (1804-1884) and Eliza Margaret O'Conor (1810-1894).

When O'Connor first emigrated to the United States from County Roscommon in Ireland, he was associated with William Kernan (father of Francis Kernan) and others in establishing a settlement on a tract of 40,000 acres in Steuben County, New York. The chief aim of this enterprise was to establish an Irish Catholic colony. Some relatives accompanied the family, including Thomas' father, Charles, who died there in 1808. He eventually abandoned the enterprise then returned to New York City and spent the rest of his life there. He devoted himself largely to literary pursuits, contributing to the journals, writing and publishing books, and editing various periodicals, including the Military Monitor, established in 1812, the Shamrock and the Globe, founded in 1819.

Thomas' wife, Margaret died 30 January 1816. As editor of the "Shamrock" he wrote of her:

"Slow to resent, she was quick to for give injuries; and the poor might draw, at will, even what was necessary to herself. For nearly 13 years, I continued happy in her society, and blessed with her love; if prosperity shed its warmth, we basked in its rays; if a fleeting cloud intervened, we were yet happy in anticipation; and even when the darkened atmosphere lowered, I found a balm in her soothing caresses. But alas! the transient blaze of human happiness is extinguished, and leaves not a hope of resuscitation. Esteem to be pure must be of that nature that is not transferable, and death has left a void that is for ever unoccupied. The deceased was fully sensible of her duty to God; and has, it may be hoped, found her reward in a world of eternal bliss. She left not a single enemy behind her, and she never knew what it was to be one.."

Thomas's son Charles O'Conor (1804-1844) was a noted lawyer and presidential nominee for the Bourbon Democrats.

== Burial ==
Thomas O'Conor is buried in the crypt under St. Patrick's Old Cathedral in New York City in the O'Conor vault, under the older spelling.
