= Delaware Straight-Out Truth Teller =

American newspaper founded 1872

- O'Conor & Adams; Honesty, Patriotism and Statesmanship
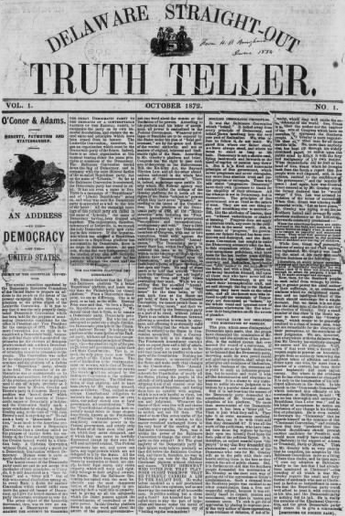
- October 10, 1872, front page
- Type: Semi-monthly
- Founder(s): John A. Brown and William Dean
- Publisher: J. A. Brown & W. Dean
- Founded: 1872
- Ceased publication: 1872?
- Political alignment: Straight-Out Democratic
- Language: English
- Headquarters: 243 Tatnall Street; Wilmington, Delaware
- City: Wilmington, Delaware
- Country: United States

The Delaware Straight-Out Truth Teller was an American semi-monthly newspaper based in Wilmington, Delaware. It was founded in 1872 by William Dean and John A. Brown in response to political dissension in relation to the United States presidential election of that year. The paper supported the Straight-Out Democratic Party presidential candidate Charles O'Conor and was a strong opposer of Liberal Republican Party candidate Horace Greeley. Its motto was "O'Conor & Adams; Honesty, Patriotism and Statesmanship." The paper appears to have ceased publishing after the election ended.

== History ==
The Delaware Straight-Out Truth Teller was founded in Wilmington, Delaware, in 1872, by William Dean and John A. Brown. It was formed due to a national political dissension related to the 1872 United States presidential election. At the 1872 National Convention, the Republican Party was divided because of a dispute relating to the running mate of incumbent president Ulysses S. Grant. A group of Republicans, "disturbed by accusations of corruption," left to create the Liberal Republican Party and endorsed Horace Greeley for president. At the Democratic National Convention, held in Baltimore, Maryland, the Democrats decided to endorse Greeley rather than nominate their own candidate. Democrats who opposed Greeley formed a separate party referred to as the Straight-Out Democratic Party and nominated Charles O'Conor for president with John Quincy Adams II as his running mate.

William Dean and John A. Brown founded the Truth Teller to oppose Greeley and promote O'Conor and Adams. Editors of the paper argued that the Democrats who supported Greeley were leaving their traditional principles and expressed frustration with them, writing "How stands the Democratic party today? The rank and file completely bewildered and lost, at seeing so many of their former leaders joining hands with that hater and vilifier of everything Democratic—the negro-worshiping Horace Greeley."

The newspaper suggested strongly against voting for Greeley, stating that voting for him was similar to voting for Grant, writing "Every Democratic vote for Greeley is a vote to wipe out the impress of Democratic principles from American politics, and to confirm every one of those dangerous and fatal doctrines which the Democratic party has steadily opposed for more than two thirds of a century."

The first issue of the Truth Teller appeared on October 10, 1872, with 5,000 copies being printed and given free of charge on the following Saturday. The Wilmington Daily Commercial reported that its first issue "proves to be a vigorous and entertaining sheet." A second issue of the Truth Teller was published on October 30. The second issue of the paper demanded that "Greeley be thrown overboard and O'Conor substituted, at the head of the regular State and County tickets." The Delaware State Journal reported that the second issue of the Truth Teller was "very interesting, positive in its support for the Louisville candidates, and earnest in its advocacy of Democratic Country and State ticket." The paper appears to have ceased publishing after Grant won the presidential election in November; it was not listed in the 1873 publication of Rowell's newspaper directory.

The paper's headquarters were located at 243 Tatnall Street in Wilmington. Its motto was "O'Conor & Adams; Honesty, Patriotism and Statesmanship."

== See also ==
- List of newspapers in Delaware
