= Bourbon Democrat =

U.S. political faction (1872–1904)

Bourbon Democrats
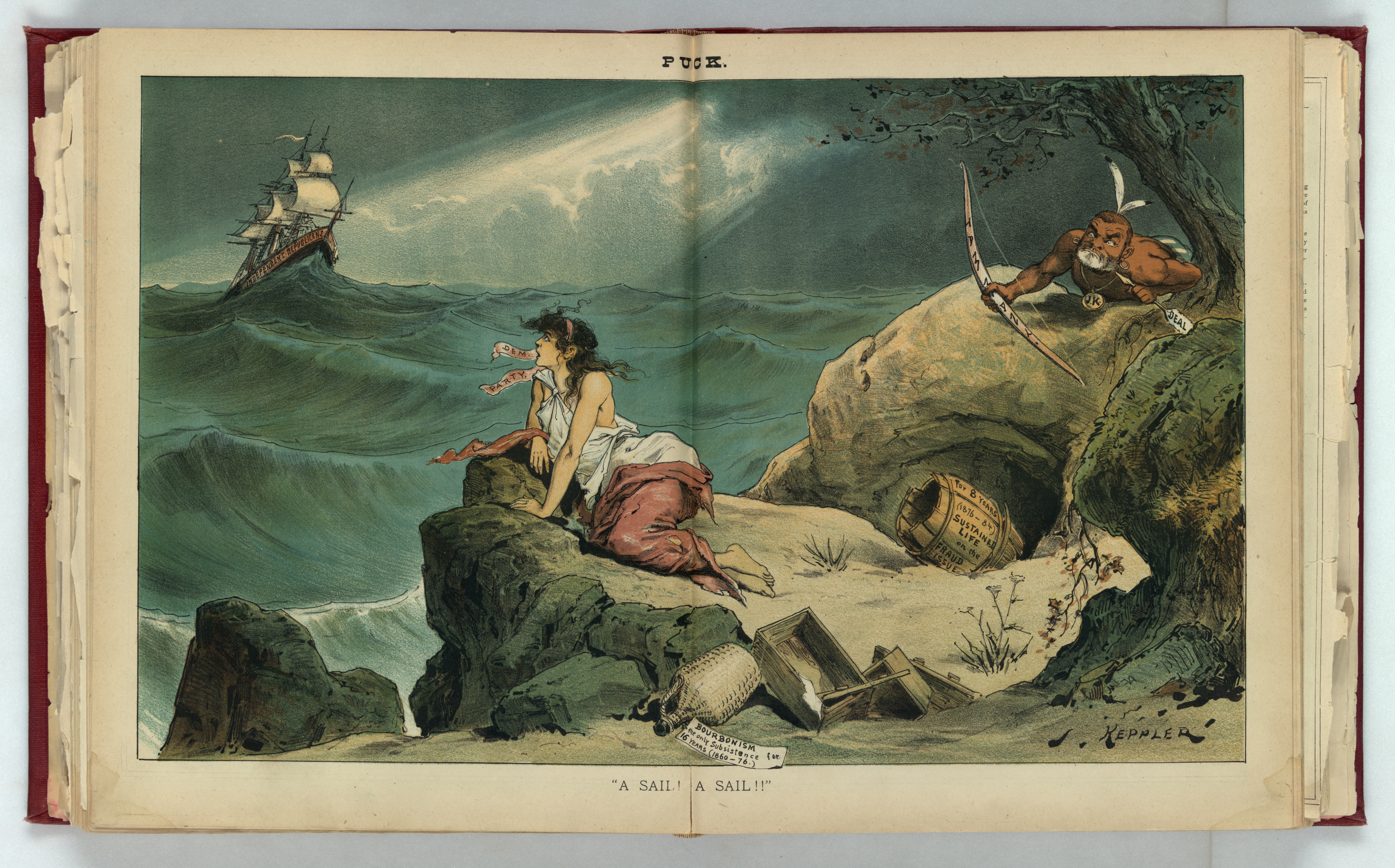
- 1884 cartoon illustrating the decline of the "Democrat Bourbonism" (represented as an empty jug) by Joseph Keppler
- Prominent members: Charles O'Conor; Samuel J. Tilden; Grover Cleveland; John M. Palmer; Alton B. Parker; Robert E. Withers
- Associated parties: Straight-Out Democratic Party; National Democratic Party
- Founded: 1872; 154 years ago
- Dissolved: 1912; 114 years ago
- Ideology: Classical liberalism Conservatism; Merit system Anti-corruption; Laissez-faire; Anti-imperialism; American nationalism Pro-Gold Standard; Fiscal conservatism
- Political position: Center-right
- National affiliation: Democratic Party
- Politics of the United States; Political parties; Elections; The term "fiscal conservatism" was not in use at the time, but in the context of modern American politics Bourbon Democrats are called "fiscal conservatives" in that they held positions opposite to "progressives" or "radical liberals".

Bourbon Democrat was a term used in the United States in the late 19th century and early 20th century (1872–1904) to refer to members of the Democratic Party who were ideologically aligned with fiscal conservatism or classical liberalism and political conservatism, especially those who supported presidential candidates Charles O'Conor in 1872; Samuel J. Tilden in 1876; President Grover Cleveland in 1884, 1888, and 1892; and Alton B. Parker in 1904.

Bourbon Democrats were promoters of a form of laissez-faire capitalism which included opposition to the high-tariff protectionism that the Republicans were advocating, as well as fiscal discipline. They represented business interests, generally supporting the goals of banking and railroads but opposing subsidies and trade protectionism; they opposed the annexation of Hawaii; they fought for the gold standard against the use of silver to inflate prices, thereby promoting what they called "hard" and "sound" money. As strong supporters of states' rights and reform movements such as the Civil Service Reform and opponents of the corrupt city bosses, Bourbons led the fight against the Tweed Ring. The anti-corruption theme earned the votes of many Republican Mugwumps in 1884.

After 1904, the Bourbons faded away. Woodrow Wilson abandoned his Bourbonism and made a deal in 1912 with the leading opponent of the Bourbons, William Jennings Bryan: Bryan endorsed Wilson for the Democratic nomination, and Wilson named Bryan Secretary of State.

The term "Bourbon Democrats" was never used by the Bourbon Democrats themselves. It was not the name of any specific or formal group, and no one running for office ever ran on a Bourbon Democrat ticket. The term "Bourbon" refers to the reactionary government of France that replaced Napoleon in 1815. Splinter Democratic parties—such as the Straight-Out Democratic Party (1872) and the National Democratic Party (1896) that actually ran candidates—fall under the more general label of Bourbon Democrats.

== Factional history ==
=== Origins of the term ===
President Grover Cleveland (1837–1908), a conservative who denounced political corruption and fought hard for lower tariffs and the gold standard, was the exemplar of a Bourbon Democrat

The nickname "Bourbon Democrat" refers to the Bourbon dynasty of kings of France, which was overthrown in the 1790s during the French Revolution but returned to power in 1815 to rule in a reactionary fashion until its overthrow in the 1830. A widely quoted aphorism at the time had it that the Bourbons "have learnt nothing, and forgotten nothing." During Reconstruction, the term "Bourbon" would have had the connotation of a retrogressive, reactionary dynasty out of step with the modern world. Everyone knew that bourbon whiskey was a favorite drink in saloons, where the Democrats often canvassed for votes.

The term was occasionally used in the 1860s and 1870s to refer to conservative Democrats (both North and South) who still held the ideas of Thomas Jefferson and Andrew Jackson and in the 1870s to refer to the regimes set up in the South by Redeemers as a conservative reaction against Reconstruction.

=== Gold Democrats and William Jennings Bryan ===
The electoral system elevated Bourbon Democrat leader Grover Cleveland to the office of president both in 1884 and in 1892, but the support for the movement declined considerably in the wake of the Panic of 1893. President Cleveland, a staunch believer in the gold standard, refused to inflate the money supply with silver, thus alienating the agrarian wing of the Democratic Party.

The delegates at the 1896 Democratic National Convention quickly turned against the policies of Cleveland and those advocated by the Bourbon Democrats, favoring free silver as a way out of the low prices in the depression. Nebraska Congressman William Jennings Bryan took the stage as the great opponent of the Bourbon Democrats. Harnessing the energy of an agrarian grassroots insurgency with his Cross of Gold speech, Congressman Bryan became the Democratic nominee for president in the 1896 election.

Some of the Bourbons sat out the 1896 election or tacitly supported William McKinley, the Republican nominee, whereas others set up the third-party ticket of the National Democratic Party led by John M. Palmer, a former Governor of Illinois. These bolters, called "Gold Democrats", mostly returned to the Democratic Party by 1900 or by 1904 at the latest. Bryan demonstrated his hold on the party by winning the 1900 and 1908 Democratic nominations as well. In 1904 Bourbon Alton B. Parker won the nomination and lost in the presidential race as did Bryan every time.

=== Decline ===
The nomination of Parker in 1904 gave a victory of sorts to pro-gold Democrats, but it was a fleeting one. The old classical liberal ideals had lost their distinctiveness and appeal. By World War I, the key elder statesman in the movement John M. Palmer had died, along with Simon Bolivar Buckner, William F. Vilas and Edward Atkinson. During the 20th century, classical liberal ideas never influenced a major political party as much as they influenced the Democrats in the early 1890s.

== State histories ==
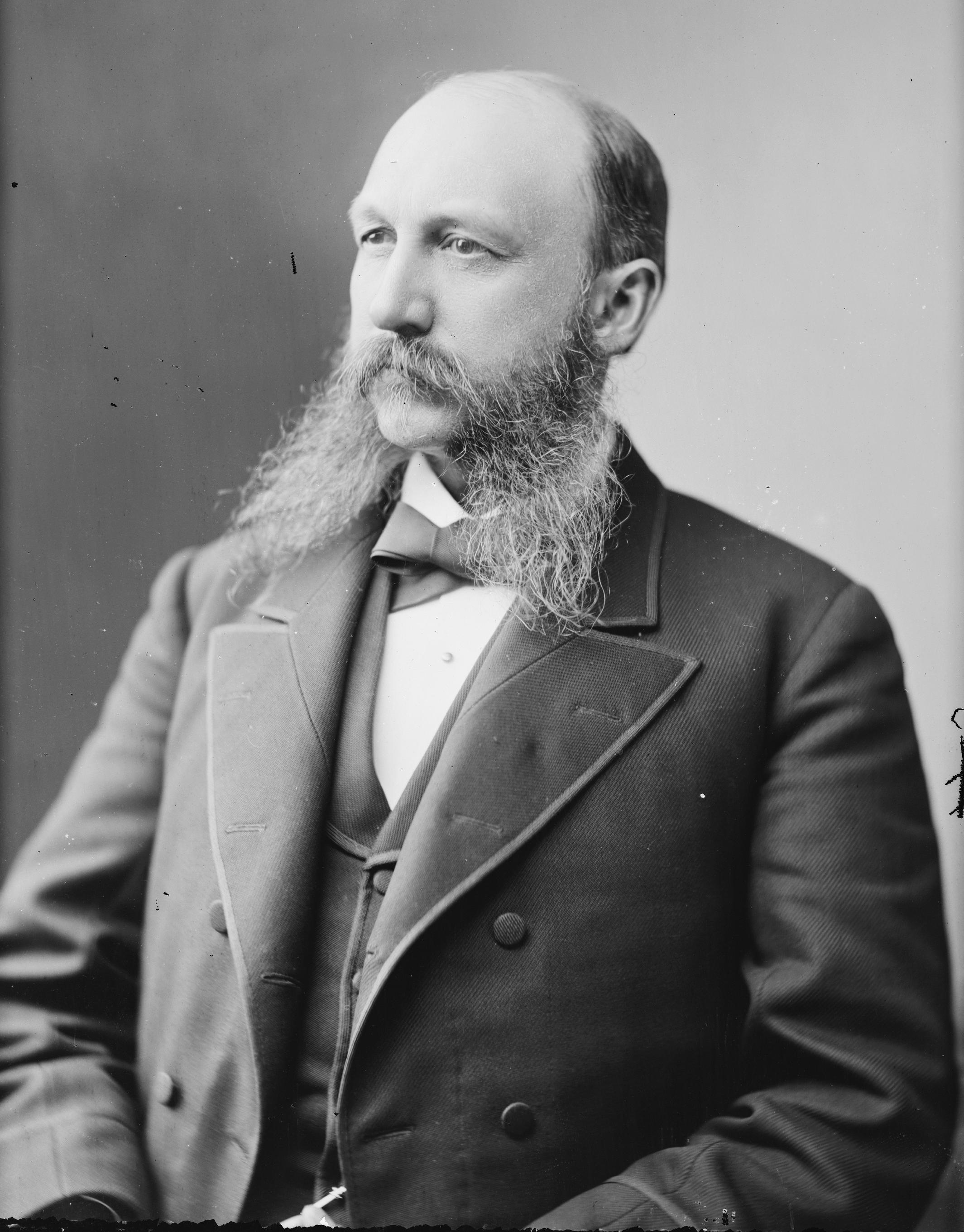
West Virginia Governor Henry Mason Mathews (1834–1884) was the first of the Bourbon Democrats to reach the highest office of state politics

=== West Virginia ===
West Virginia was formed in 1863 after Unionists from northwestern Virginia establish the Restored Government of Virginia. It remained in Republican control until the passing of the Flick Amendment in 1871 returned states rights to West Virginians who had supported the defunct Confederacy. A Democratic push led to a reformatting of the West Virginia State Constitution that resulted in more power to the Democratic Party. In 1877 Henry M. Mathews, as a Bourbon, was elected governor of the state, and the Bourbons held onto power in the state until the 1893 election of Republican George W. Atkinson.

=== Louisiana ===
In the spring of 1896, mayor John Fitzpatrick of New Orleans, leader of the city's Bourbon Democratic organization, left office after a scandal-ridden administration, his chosen successor badly defeated by reform candidate Walter C. Flower. However, Fitzpatrick and his associates quickly regrouped, organizing themselves on December 29 into the Choctaw Club, which soon received considerable patronage from Louisiana governor and Fitzpatrick ally Murphy Foster. Fitzpatrick, a power at the 1898 Louisiana Constitutional Convention, was instrumental in exempting immigrants from the new educational and property requirements designed to disenfranchise blacks. In 1899, he managed the successful mayoral campaign of Bourbon candidate Paul Capdevielle.

=== Mississippi ===
Mississippi in 1877–1902 was politically controlled by the conservative whites, called "Bourbons" by their critics. The Bourbons represented the planters, landowners and merchants and used coercion and cash to control enough black votes to control the Democratic Party conventions and thus state government.

Elected to the House of Representatives in 1885 and serving until 1901, Mississippi Democrat Thomas C. Catchings participated in the politics of both presidential terms of Cleveland, particularly the free silver controversy and the agrarian discontent that culminated in populism. As a gold standard supporter, he found himself defending Cleveland from attacks of silverite Mississippians over the 1893 repeal of the Sherman Silver Purchase Act and other of Cleveland's actions unpopular in the South. Caught in the middle between his loyalty to Cleveland and the southern Democrat silverites, Catchings continued as a sound money legislative leader for the minority in Congress while hoping that Mississippi Democrats would return to the conservative philosophical doctrines of the original Bourbon Democrats in the South.

== Prominent Bourbon Democrats ==
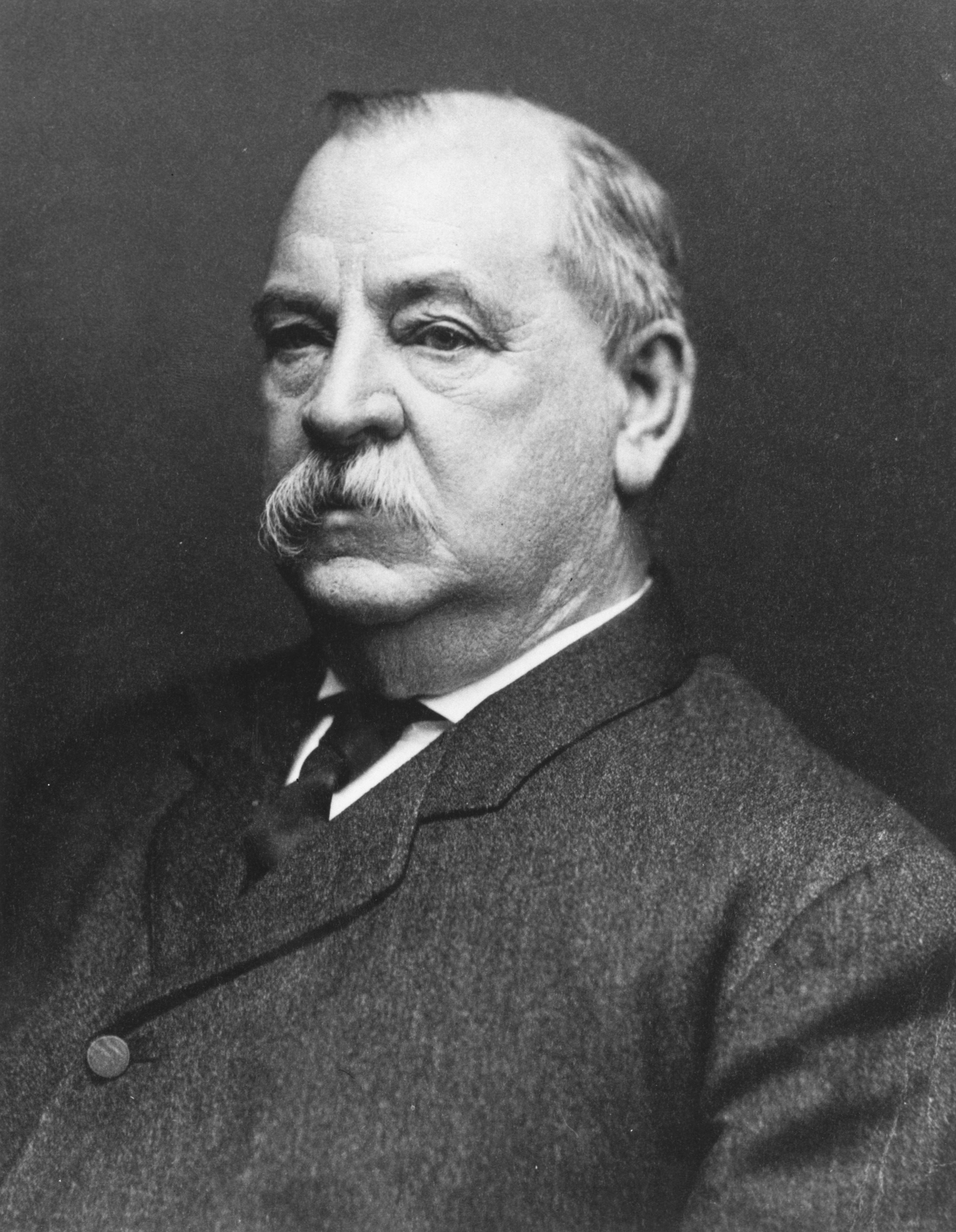
President Grover Cleveland (NY)

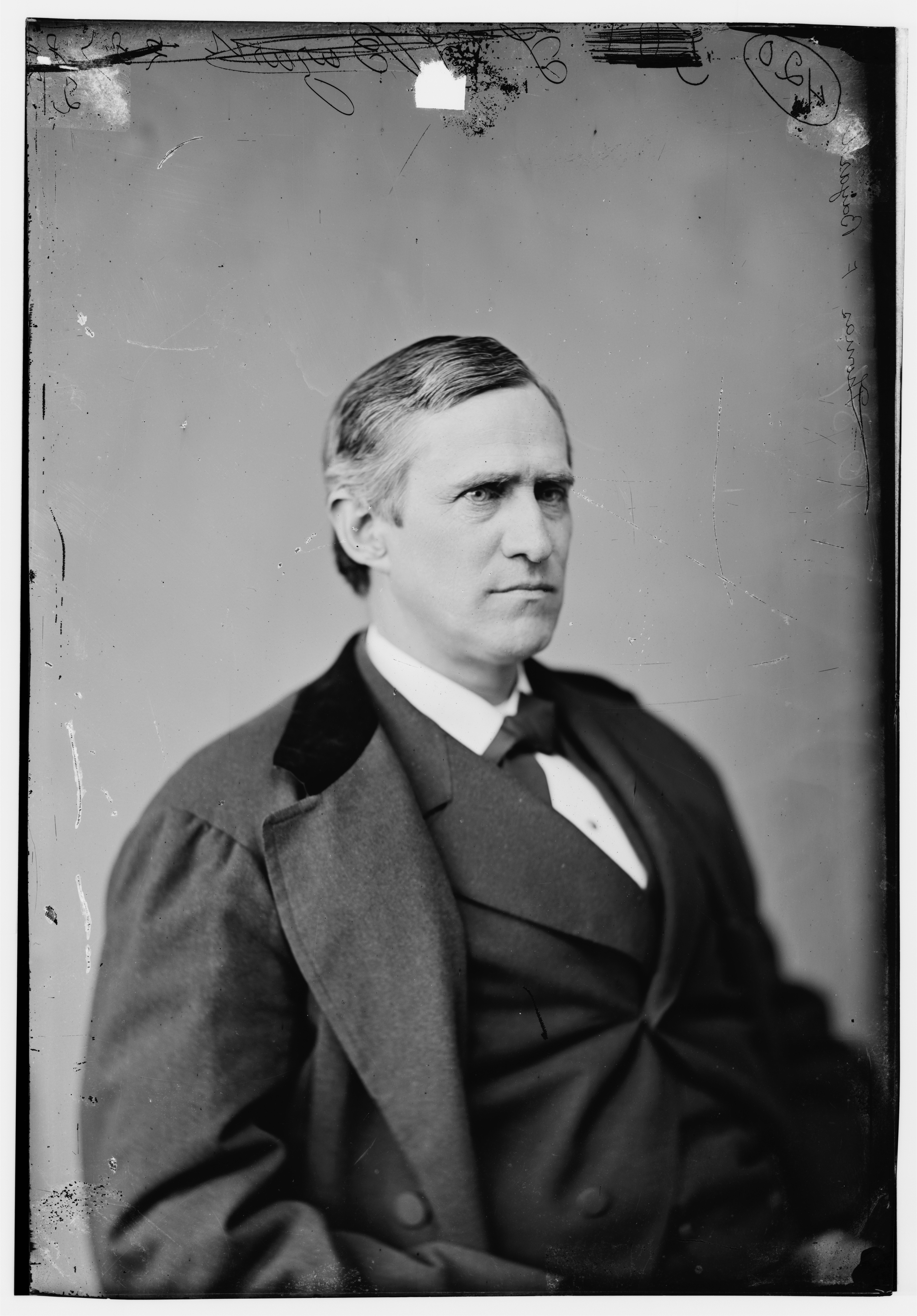
State Secretary Thomas F. Bayard (DE)

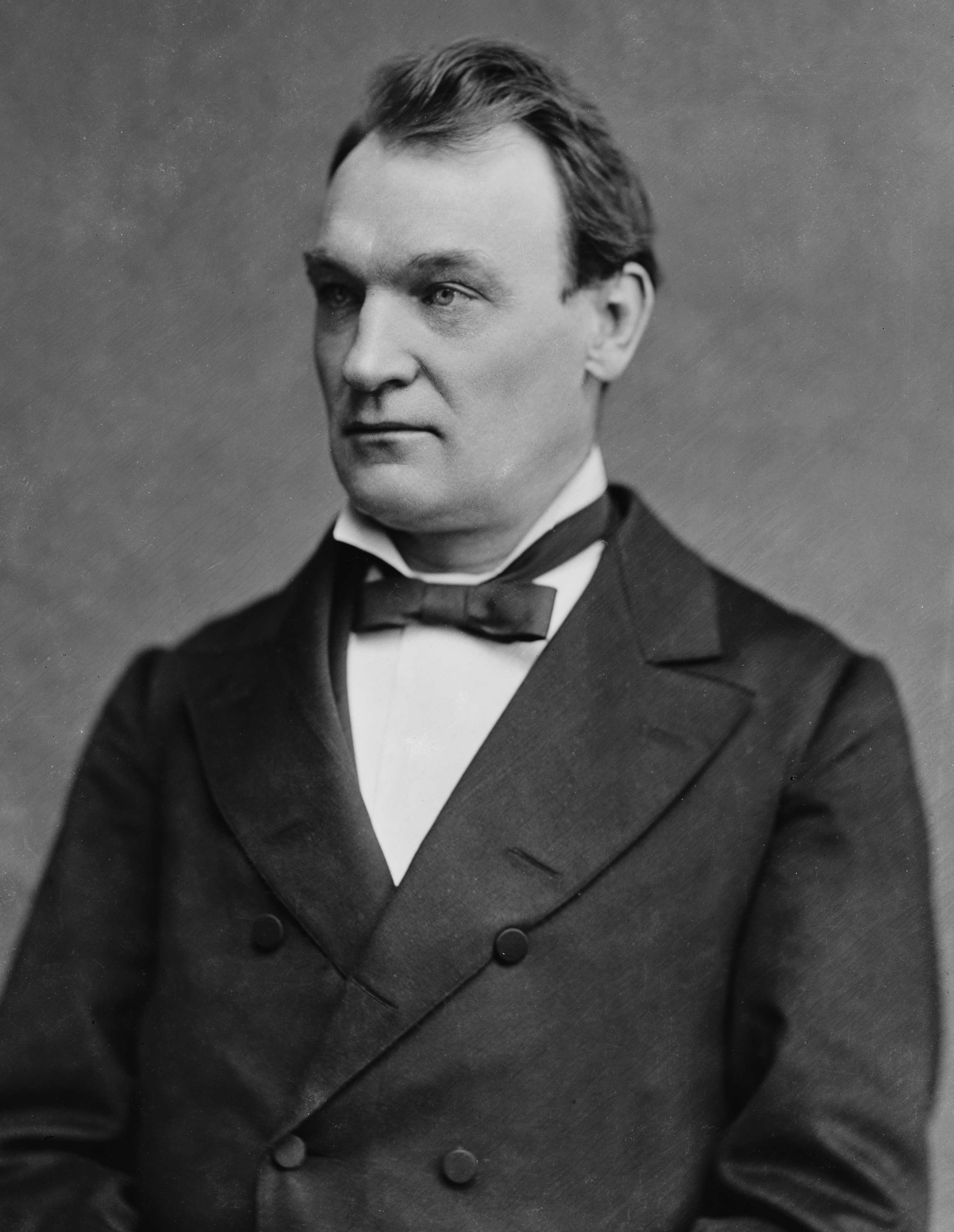
Treasury Secretary John G. Carlisle (KY)

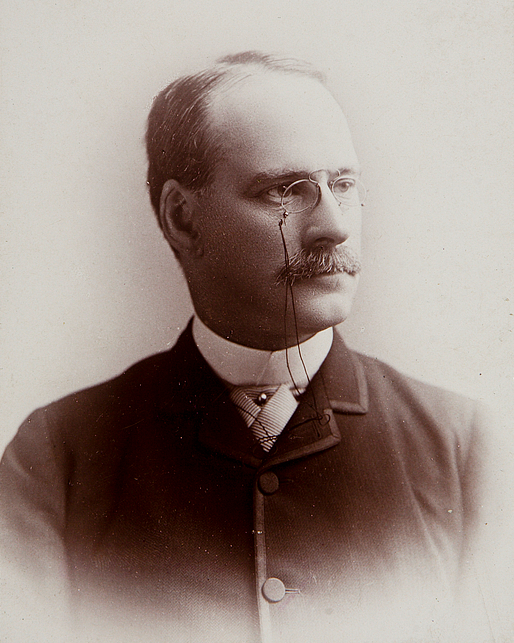
Navy Secretary William C. Whitney (NY)

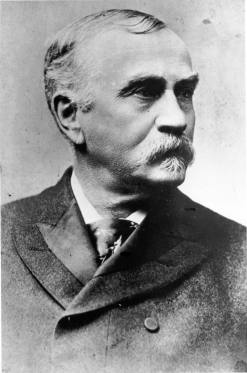
Agriculture Secretary J. Sterling Morton (NE)

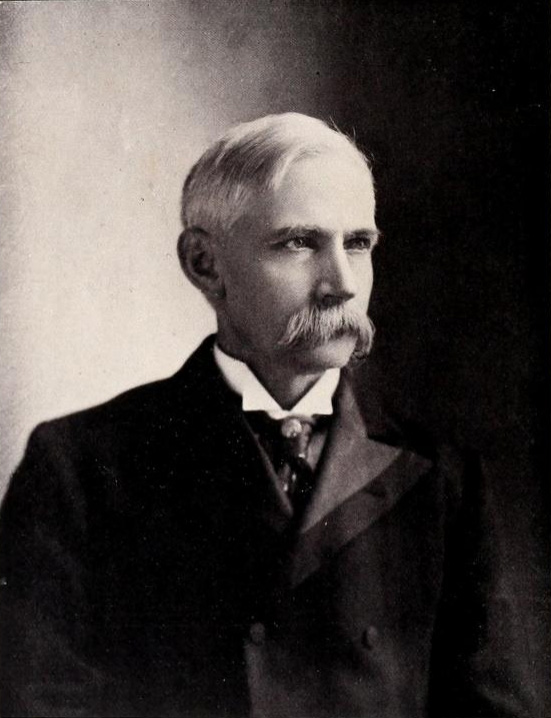
Postmaster General William L. Wilson (WV)

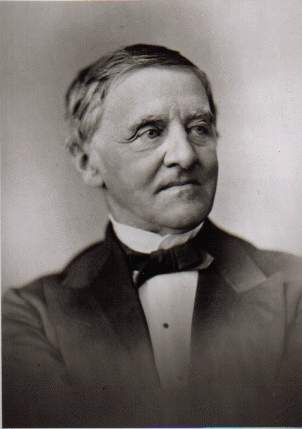
Governor Samuel J. Tilden (NY)

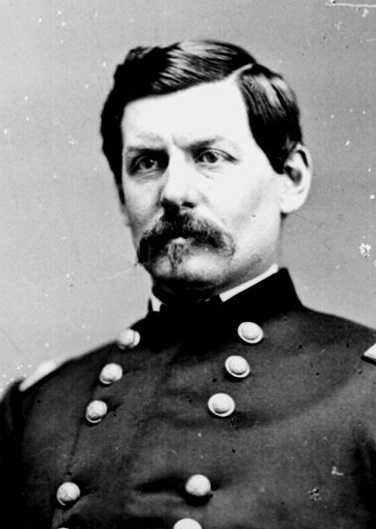
Governor George B. McClellan (NJ)

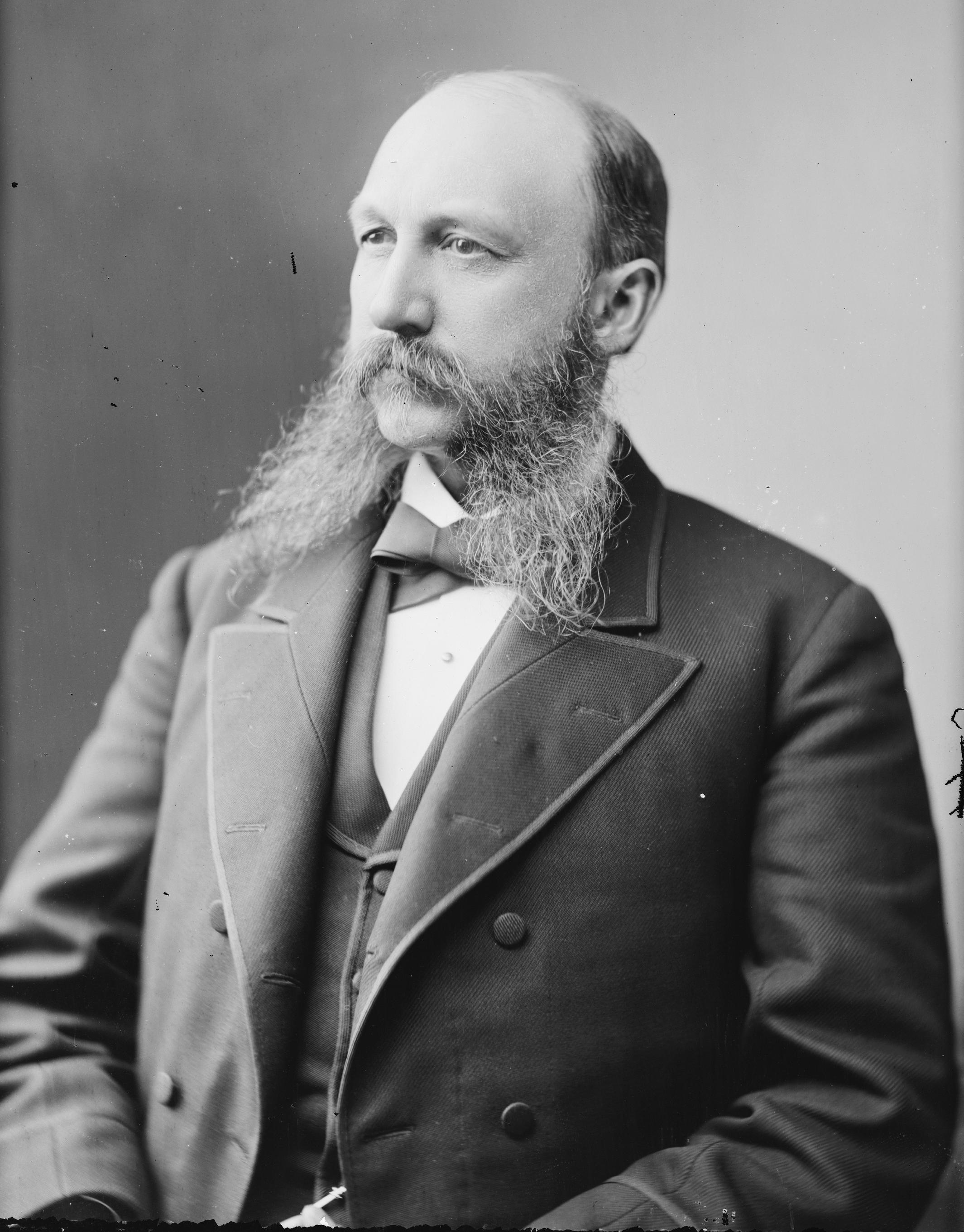
Governor Henry M. Mathews (WV)

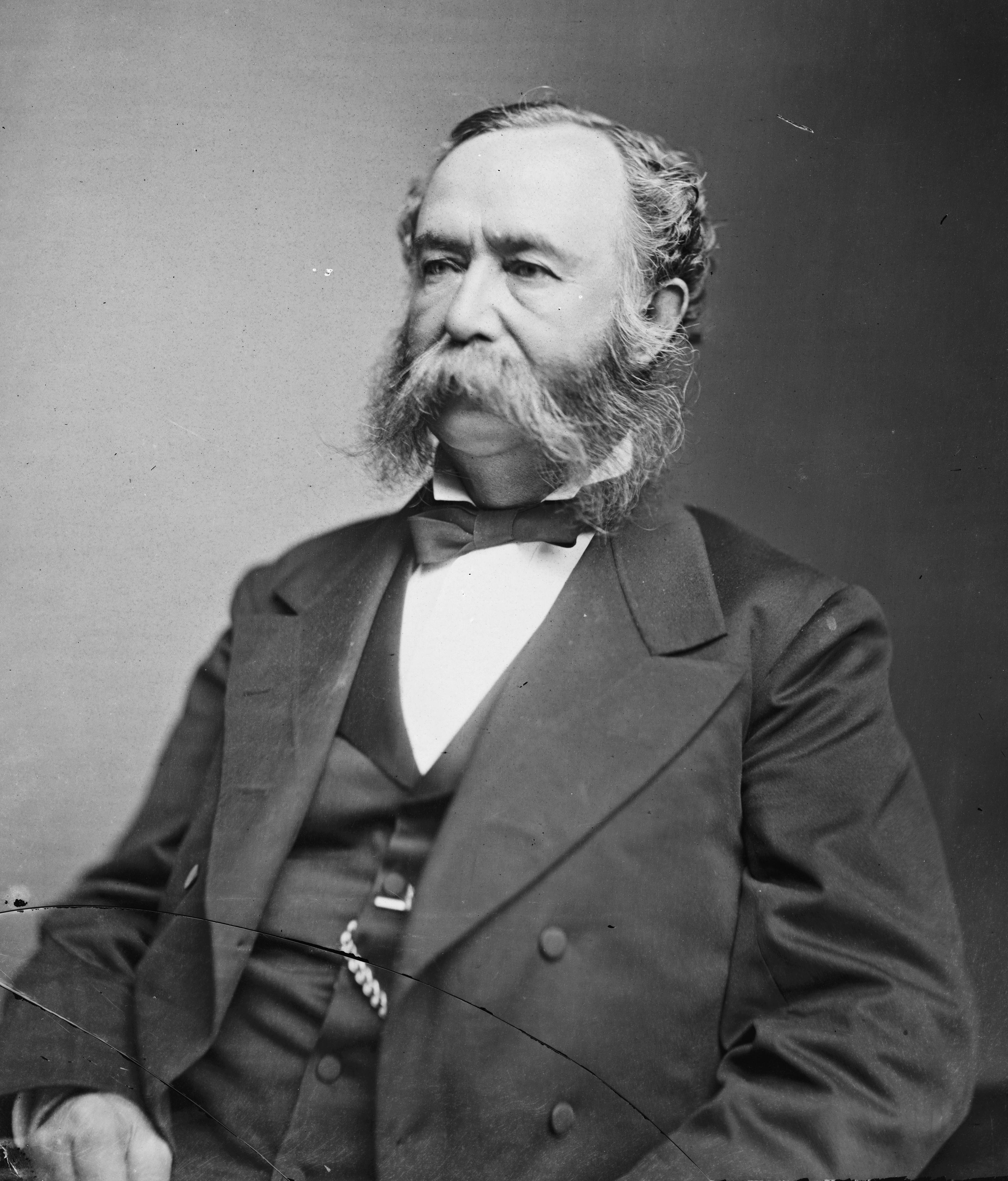
Senator Wade Hampton III (SC)

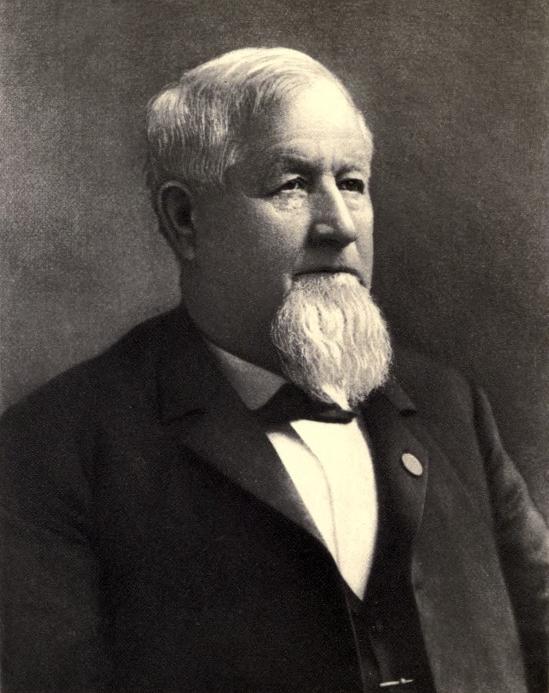
Senator John M. Palmer (IL)

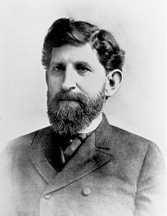
Senator Calvin S. Brice (OH)

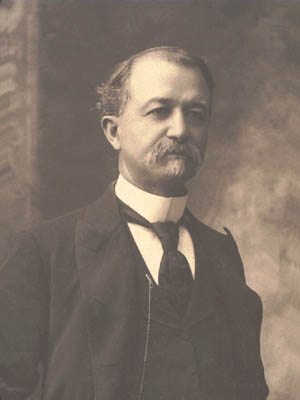
Senator Murphy J. Foster (LA)

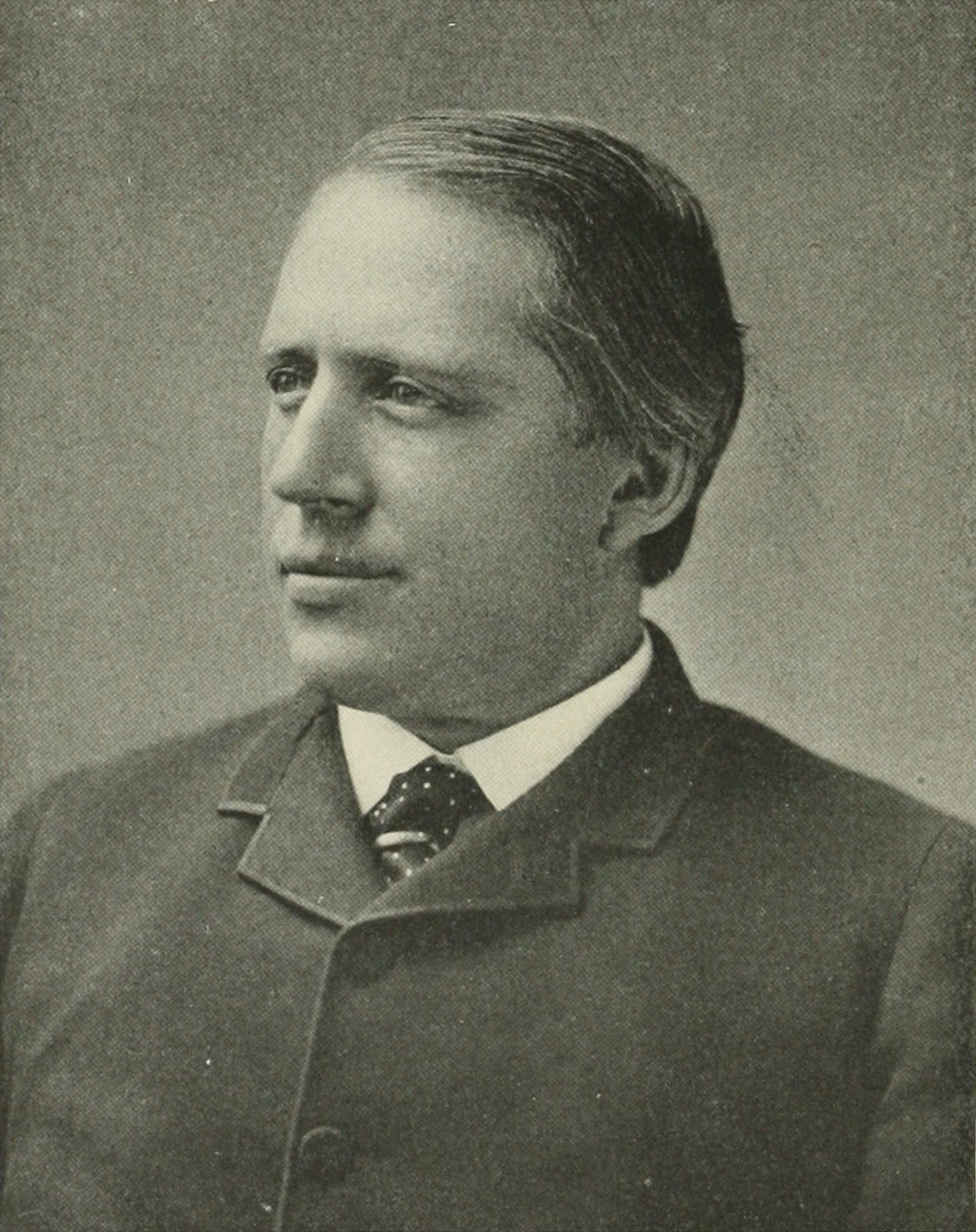
Senator Arthur P. Gorman (MD)

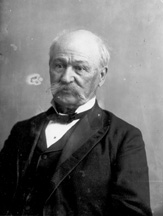
Senator Isham G. Harris (TN)

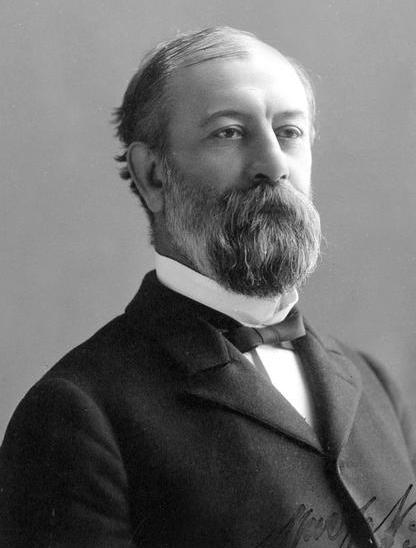
Senator William Freeman Vilas (WI)

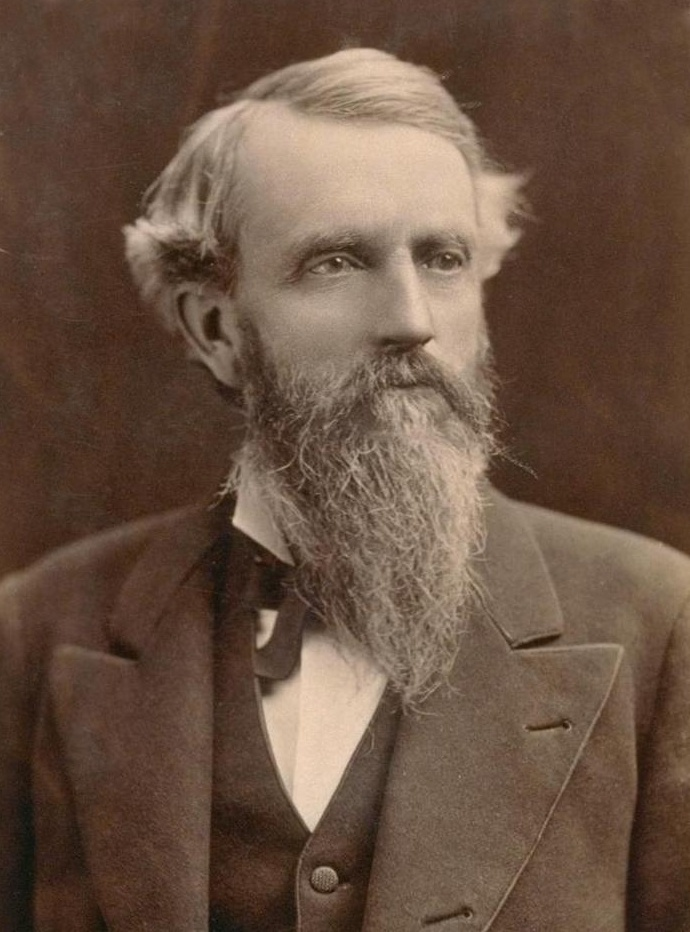
Senator George Hearst (CA)

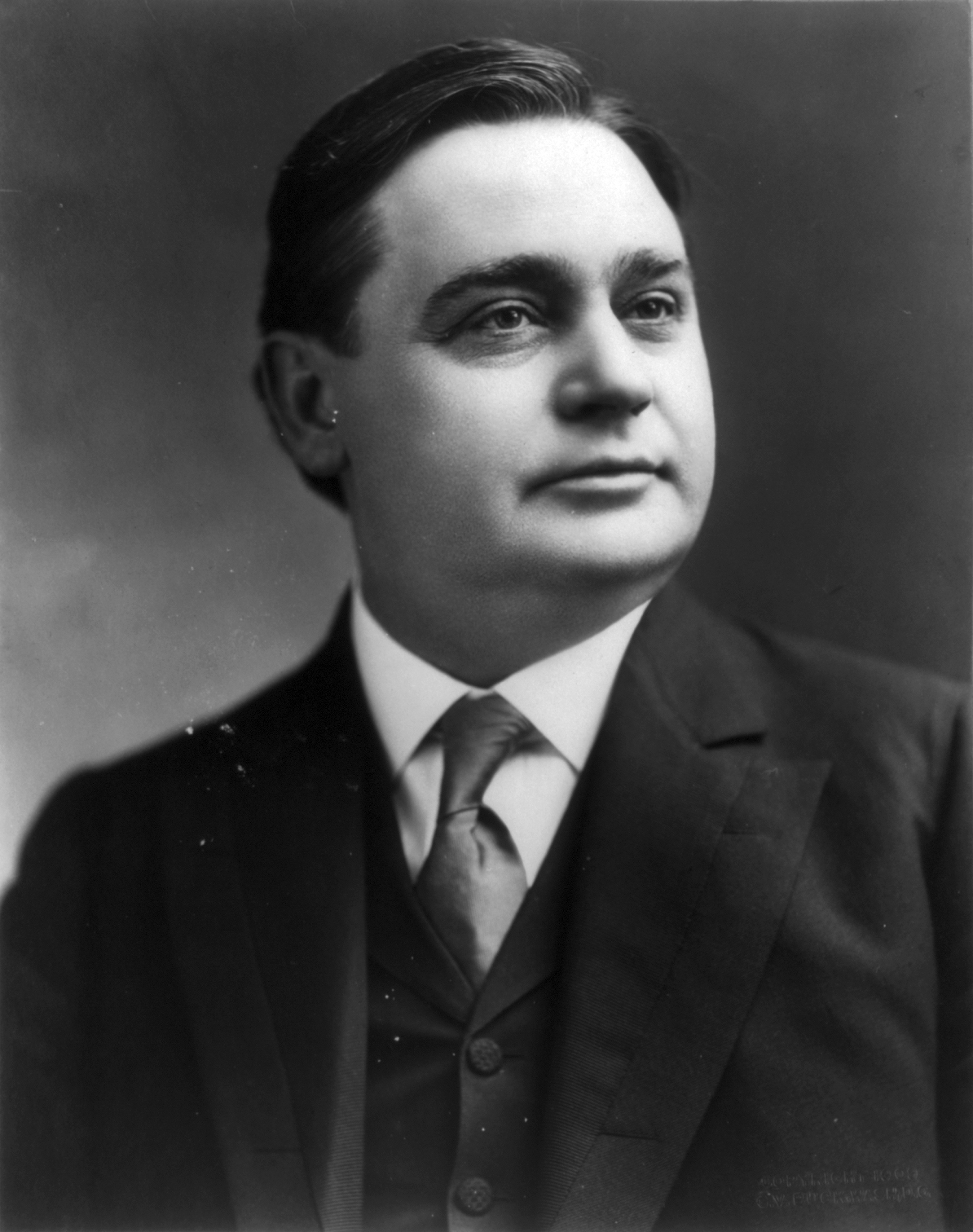
Senator Joseph W. Bailey (TX)

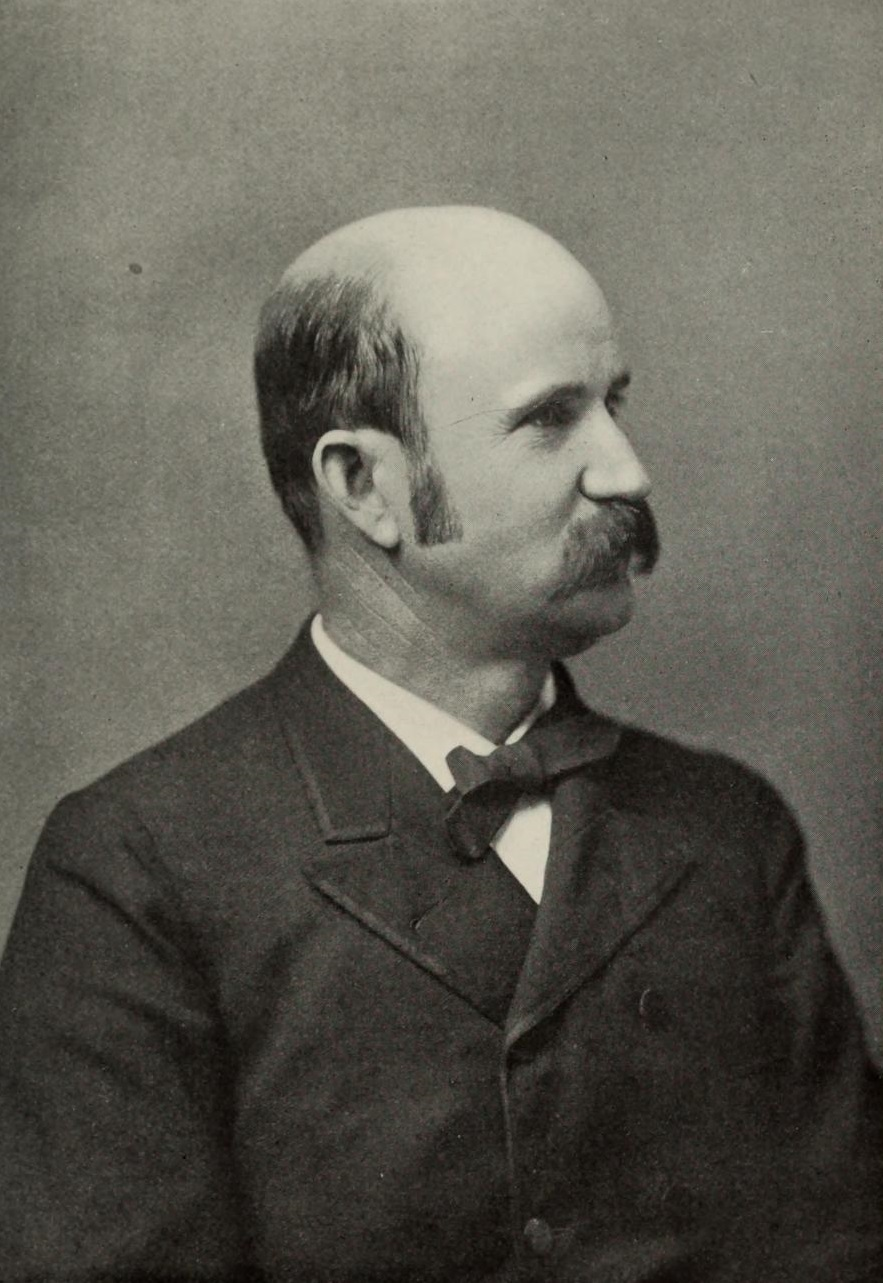
Senator David B. Hill (NY)

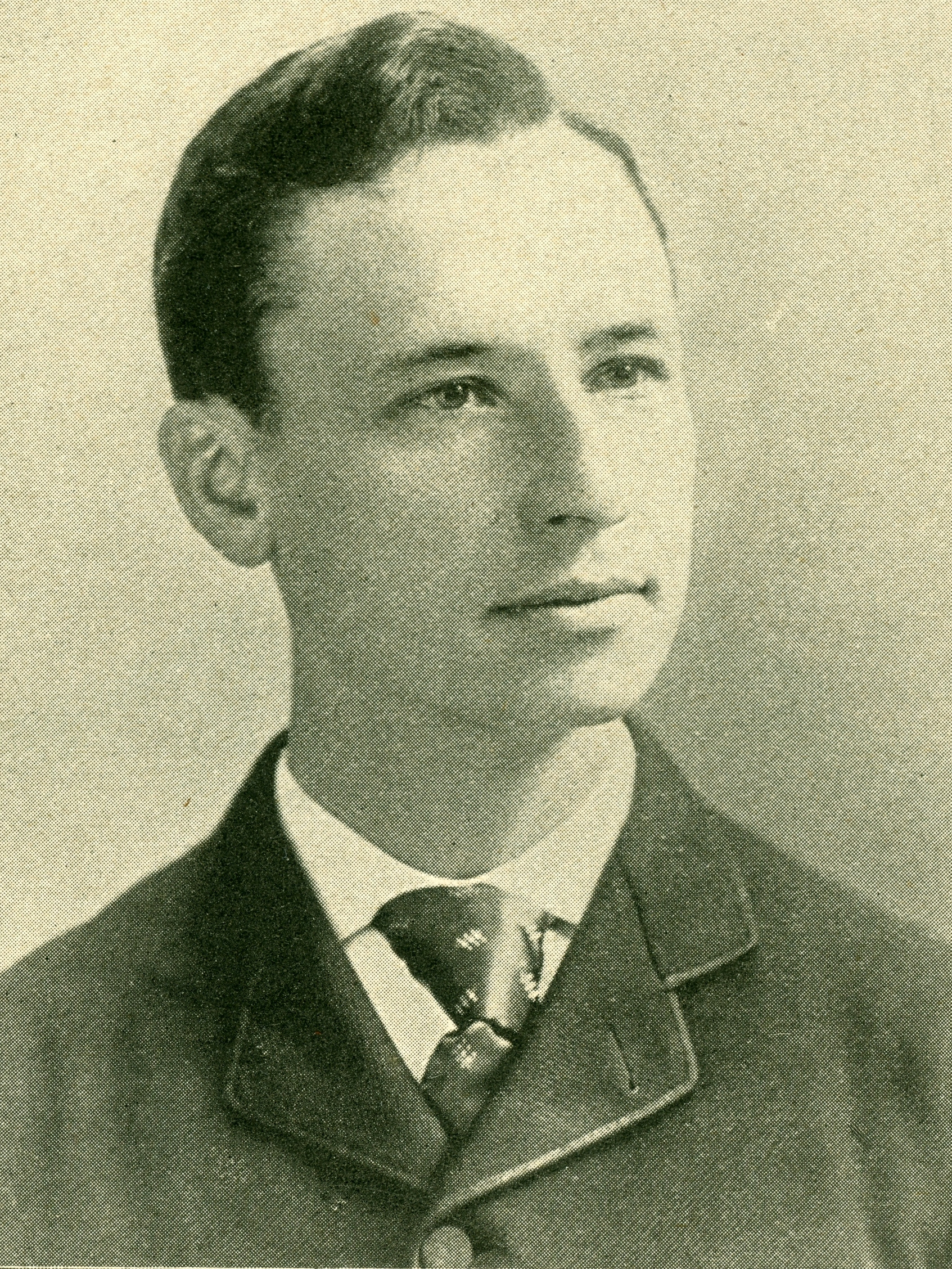
Governor William E. Russell (MA)

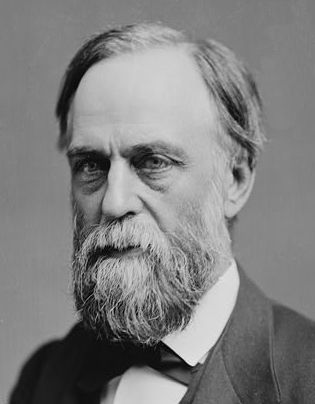
Hon. Abram Hewitt (NY)

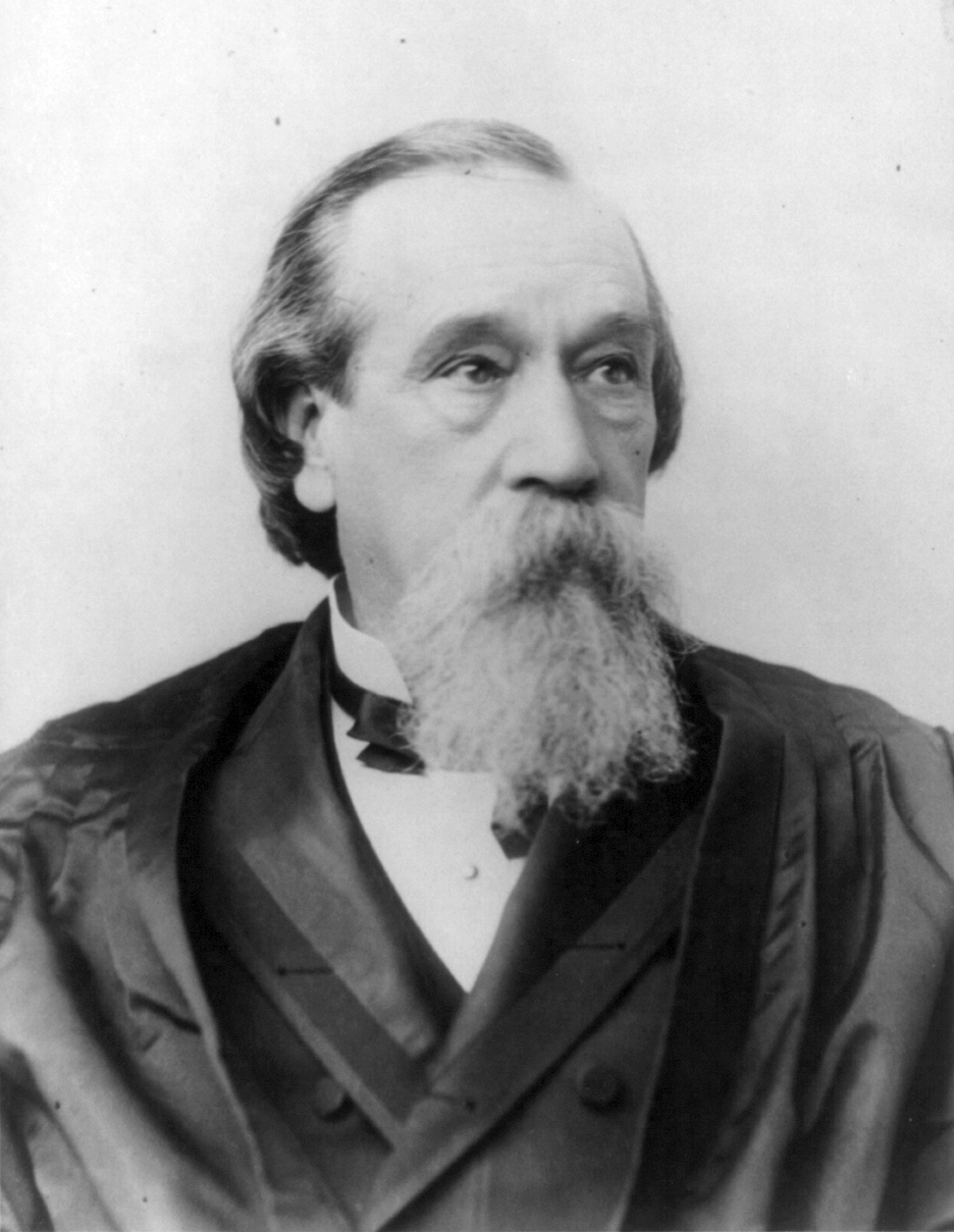
Associate Justice Lucius Q. C. Lamar II (MS)

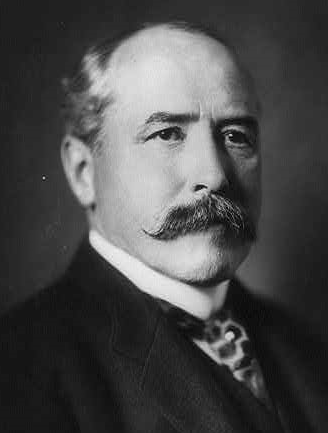
Judge Alton B. Parker (NY)

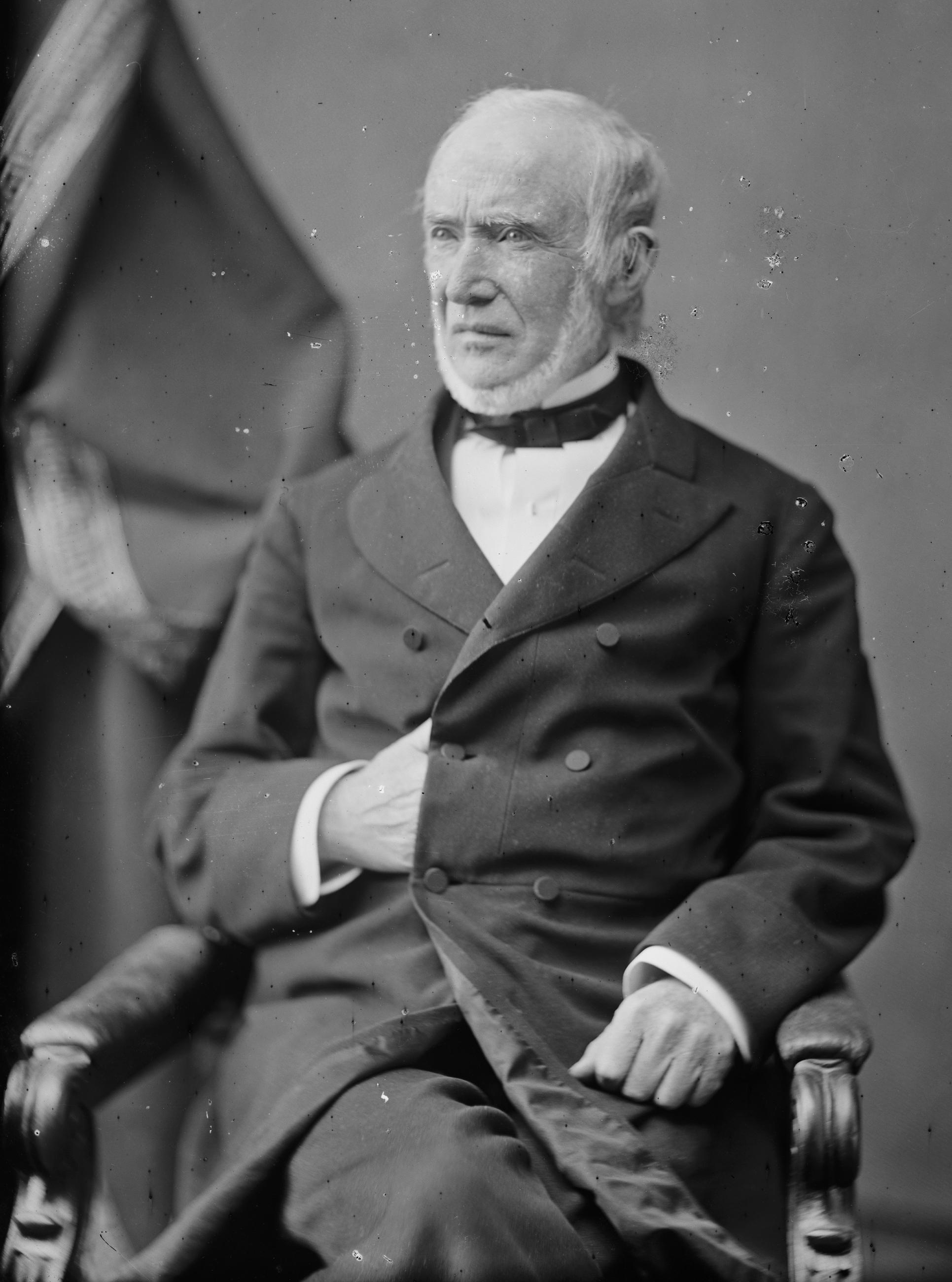
Attorney Charles O'Conor (NY)

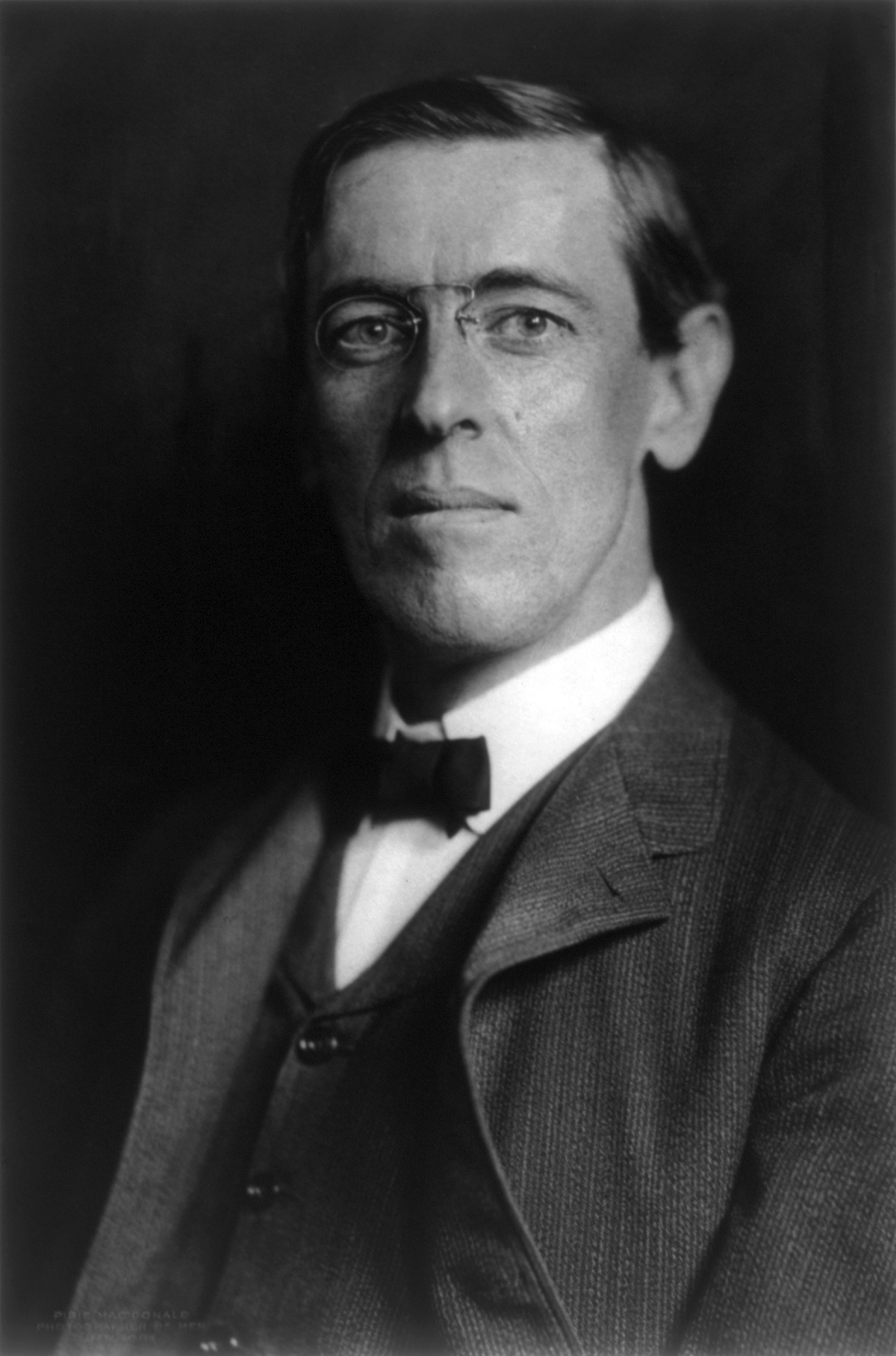
Academic (later President) Woodrow Wilson (NJ)

== Legacy ==
During the segregationist response to Civil Rights in the United States, the Southern Democrats were often referred to as neobourbons. Popularized by Numan Bartley, the social outlook of neobourbons was said to match the ideals of Bourbons who resisted the first reconstruction. Neobourbons were categorized as industrialists who resisted efforts at labor and civil rights in the Black Belt, while representing a paternalistic view of segregation. They relied on scientific racism while having white supremacist goals of protecting institutions of segregation and identifying with "Older Bourbons".

== See also ==
- Blue Dog Coalition
- Conservative Democrat
- Libertarian Democrat
- Old Right
