= Charles O'Conor (American politician) =

American lawyer and politician (1804–1884)

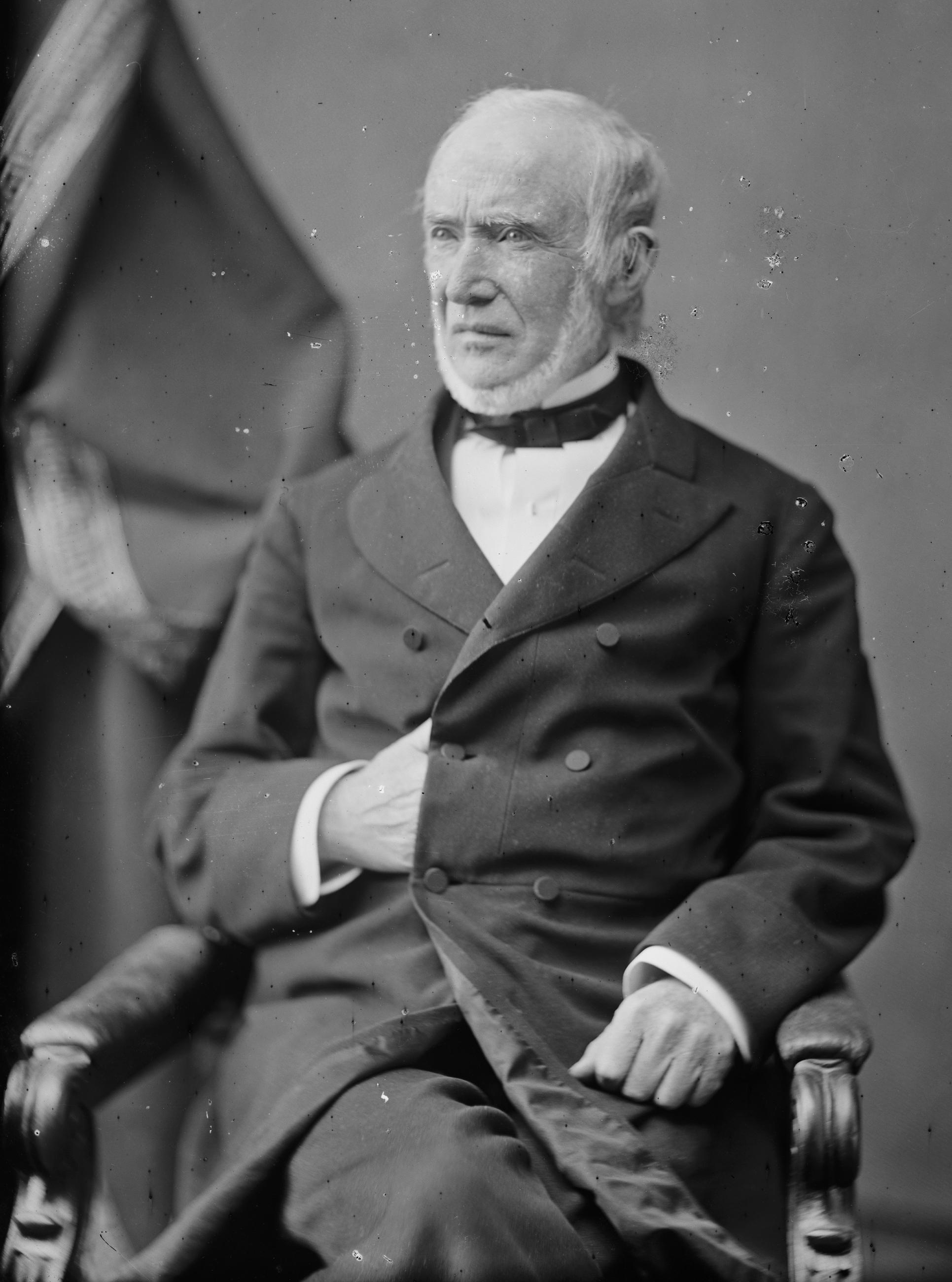

United States Attorney for the Southern District of New York
- In office 1853–1854
- Nominated by: Franklin Pierce
- Preceded by: Jonathan Prescott Hall
- Succeeded by: John McKeon

Personal details
- Born: January 22, 1804 New York City, New York, U.S.
- Died: May 12, 1884 (aged 80) Nantucket, Massachusetts, U.S.
- Party: Democratic
- Other political affiliations: National Democratic
- Spouse: Cornelia Livingston (m. 1854, died 1874)
- Profession: Attorney
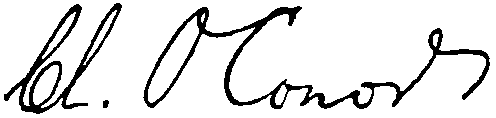
- Signature

Charles O'Conor (January 22, 1804 – May 12, 1884) was an American lawyer who was notable for his career as a trial advocate and candidacy in the 1872 presidential election. He was the first Catholic presidential nominee.

Born in New York City, after his father fled Ireland following participation in the Irish Rebellion of 1798, O'Conor was educated in the city and began to study law at age 16. Admitted to the bar at age 20, O'Conor developed a reputation as an effective trial attorney, especially in civil cases. A conservative Democrat in politics, he was a longtime friend of Samuel Tilden. He served as a delegate to the 1852 Democratic National Convention, and was United States Attorney for the Southern District of New York from 1853 to 1854. During the American Civil War, O'Conor supported the Union. After the war, he served as counsel for Jefferson Davis after Davis was indicted for treason, and helped post Davis' bail.

In 1871, O'Conor was among the prominent New Yorkers who played a role in the overthrow of corrupt political boss William M. Tweed. In 1872, he was among the conservative Democrats who refused to support Horace Greeley, the nominee of the Liberal Republicans and the Democrats. He was nominated for president by the Straight-Out Democratic Party, with John Quincy Adams II as his running mate. O'Conor did not accept the nomination but remained on the ballot and received a scattering of votes, while the election was won easily by incumbent Republican Ulysses S. Grant. O'Conor was one of Democratic nominee Samuel Tilden's lawyers in 1876, when Tilden unsuccessfully contested the results of that year's presidential election.

O'Conor retired in 1881, and settled in Nantucket, Massachusetts. He died there on May 12, 1884, and was buried at St. Patrick's Old Cathedral in New York City.

== Early life and family ==
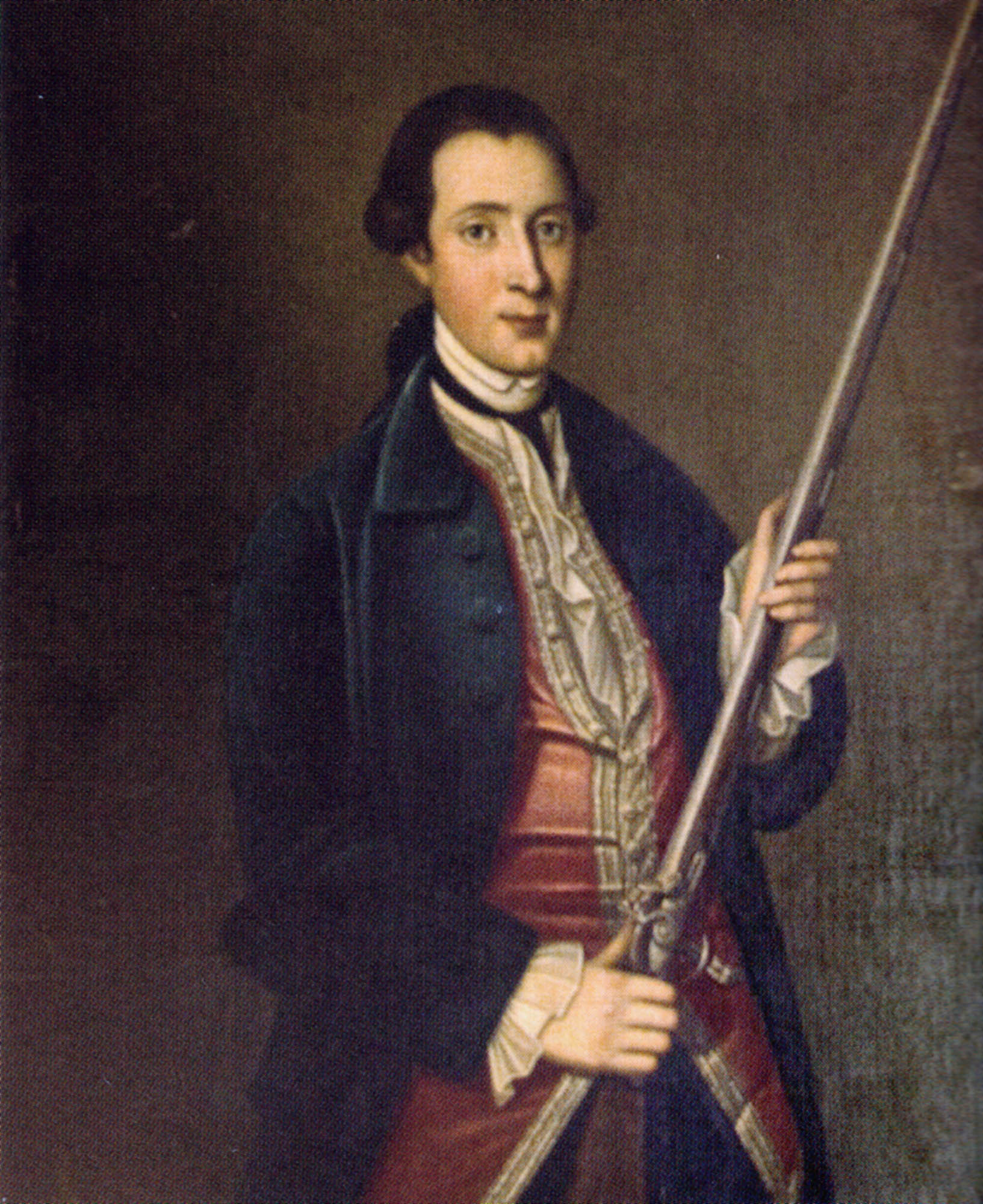
Charles O'Conor of Mount Allen (1736–1808), grandfather of Charles O'Conor.

O'Conor was born in New York City, the son of Thomas O'Conor (1770–1855), a cadet member of the Catholic Gaelic-Irish aristocratic O'Conor Don family, who after the failed 1798 Rebellion as a sworn in member (sworn in personally by Wolfe Tone of the United Irishmen) in 1801 fled from County Roscommon, Ireland, to New York, where he devoted himself chiefly to journalism. Charles was the great grandson of Charles O'Conor of Balanagare, was a well known Antiquarian, Writer, and Catholic emancipation during the 18th century.

== Law ==
At the age of 16, O'Conor began to read law, first in the office of Henry W. Stannard, then with Stephen D. Lemoyne, and finally with Joseph D. Fay. O'Conor attained admission to the bar in 1824, before he had attained the statutory age of 21, and soon won high reputation in his profession.

He brought the Forrest divorce case to a successful issue for his client, Mrs. Forrest. Contending against John Van Buren and other eminent counsel, he secured her a liberal alimony. This case brought him more than ever into national reputation. Two silver vases were presented to him in its commemoration: one was the gift of thirty women of New York, the other was presented by sixty members of the bar. These he bequeathed to the New York Law Institute, and they are now preserved in the library of the institute. In the same library are preserved the bound records of his cases and opinions—a unique collection that was made by himself, and also bequeathed in his will to the institute. These fill over 100 volumes.

Others of his celebrated private cases were the Slave Jack case in 1835, the Lispenard will case in 1843, the Lemmon slave case in 1856, the Parrish will case in 1862, and the Jumel suit in 1871, involving the title to $6,000,000 in real estate. In 1869 he was elected president of the New York Law Institute.

He took a prominent part in the prosecution of Boss Tweed and members of the "Tweed Ring". This proceeding began in 1871, and eventually destroyed the Tweed Ring that was then at the height of its power in New York City. In the original cases he was associated with William M. Evarts, James Emott, and Wheeler H. Peckham. These suits were brought in the attorney general's office, a special branch of which was established for the purpose, and named by him the Bureau of Municipal Correction. In 1875, the court of appeals decided that the cases should have been brought by the city. O'Conor immediately drafted the Civil Remedies Act, which was enacted at the next session of the legislature, and under which new suits were at once begun. Disheartened with the issue of the first cases, O'Conor published an account of them, entitled Peculation Triumphant, being the Record of a Five Years' Campaign against Official Malversation, A.D. 1871-1875 (New York, 1875). He declined any compensation for his services in the Tweed cases.

== Politics ==
In 1848 he became a member of the Directory of the Friends of Ireland, a society that was organized in anticipation of a rising in Ireland, and he presided at some of the meetings in the same year. In this year he was also a candidate on the Democratic ticket for Lieutenant Governor of New York, but was defeated, although he received several thousand more votes than the other candidates of his party.

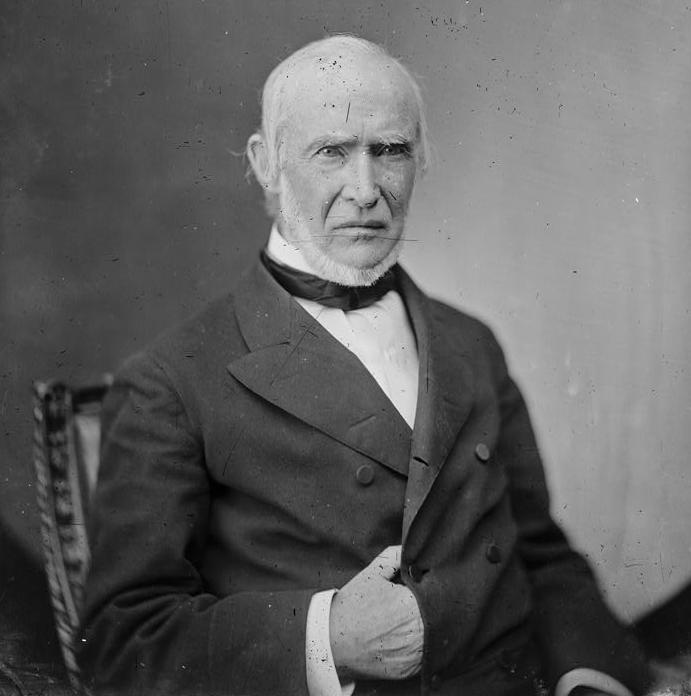
Charles O'Conor

In 1852, he was a presidential elector on the Democratic ticket, voting for Franklin Pierce. He was United States Attorney for the Southern District of New York from 1853 to 1854. In politics he supported the States' rights Democrats and sympathized throughout the American Civil War with the Southern states. After the war he became senior counsel for Jefferson Davis on his indictment for treason. He also appeared upon Davis's bond when the latter was admitted to bail. These facts and O'Conor's connection with the Roman Catholic Church affected unfavourably his political fortunes.

In the 1872 U.S. presidential election, O'Conor was nominated for the presidency by the "Bourbon Democrats" or "Straight-Out Democrats", who refused to support Horace Greeley, and by the "Labor Reformers". He declined the nomination, as did his running mate, John Quincy Adams II, but they remained on the ballot anyway and received 21,559 votes. The election was won by incumbent President Ulysses S. Grant of the Republican Party.

In the electoral contest of 1876, he appeared as advocate for the claims of Samuel J. Tilden before the Electoral Commission.

== Retirement ==
He built a house at Nantucket, Massachusetts, in 1881, with a fireproof library adjoining it, and lived there until his death in 1884; he is entombed in St. Patrick's Old Cathedral, New York City.

== Family ==
In 1854, O'Conor married Mrs. Cornelia (Livingston) McCracken. They had no children, and separated soon after marrying; they lived apart until her death on May 12, 1874.
