= Straight-Out Democratic Party =

American political parties (1872–1890)

"Straight-Out Democratic Party" (or "Straightout Democratic Party") is the name used by three minor American political parties between 1872 and 1890.

The first Straight-Out Democratic Party played a minor role in the U.S. presidential election of 1872. An unrelated Straightout Democrat (no hyphen) faction of the South Carolina Democratic Party triumphed in the 1876 South Carolina gubernatorial election, and a revival of the 1876 party played a minor role in the 1890 South Carolina gubernatorial election. The Straightout Democrat was also a newspaper in Columbia, South Carolina, active between 1878 and 1879.

== 1872 national party ==
The Straight-Out Democratic Party was a Southern faction that broke with the Democratic Party in the 1872 presidential election. Dissatisfied with the Democratic Party throwing their support to the Liberal Republican candidate Horace Greeley, they held a convention on August 16 in Louisville, Kentucky; 604 delegates from all states attended. The delegates nominated Charles O'Conor for President (who informed them by telegram that he would not accept their nomination) and John Quincy Adams II for Vice President.

=== Philosophy ===
In a letter accepting his nomination, Adams provided a lengthy description of the party's philosophy:

I was of those who hoped that genuine and homogenous movement in the direction of a radical reform in the administration of the General Government, and a return to the simplicity of function and strictly circumscribed activity to which the Constitution seems to me to restrict the Federal Government, might have been concerted between a large part of the Democratic Party and a considerable body of Republicans, who were known to be dissatisfied and alarmed by the course of the Administration. There were several distinguished statesmen in that class who had debated with decency and differed with us with respect to measures rather than fundamental and essential principle, whom any honest and consistent Democrat could have followed naturally and cordially to such a path – men of tried and admitted fitness for the place. But instead of such a man, a candidate was selected [Horace Greeley] whom no one had ever deemed peculiarly fitted for the Presidency – whom many thought curiously unfitted for it and a man, moreover, whose favorite style of controversy, as well as his cherished principles of government, rendered it almost impossible for any Democrat to support with self-respect, and whom no thoughtful Democrat could vote for without an apparent abandonment of the elementary and essential principles of his political faith. For either the Democrat party believes, first and last, and always, that the least possible interference of the Government with the free action of the people, which is consistent with preserving order and dispensing justice, is the crowning merit of such a system as we have adopted in America, or that party has become a mere office-seeking machine. But the candidate adopted at Baltimore [in the 1872 Democratic Party convention] is of all men in the United States the one who most vehemently believes and declares that this doctrine is of all political heresies the most heinoius; that it is held only by wicked men; and that the true sphere of government, on the contrary, is to try to make money for the people.

Lacking time to find a new candidate, the party ran the ticket despite O'Conor's refusal. They received 23,054 votes (0.36%) and no Electoral College votes.

== 1876 South Carolina gubernatorial election ==
In the 1876 South Carolina gubernatorial election, the Straightout Democrats (no hyphen) were an activist faction that succeeded in taking control of the party. They sometimes wore red shirts to show their support for the paramilitary white supremacist groups known as Red Shirts, who used violence and the threat of violence to prevent blacks from voting. Their candidate, Wade Hampton III, became governor.

== 1890 South Carolina gubernatorial election ==
An unsuccessful breakaway group of Democrats in the 1890 South Carolina gubernatorial election called themselves the Straightout Democrats. They wore red shirts in memory of the 1876 party.

== Newspaper ==
The Delaware Straight-Out Truth Teller was the name of a newspaper published in Wilmington, Delaware, in 1872.

The Straight-Out Democrat was the name of a newspaper published in Columbia, South Carolina, between 1878 and 1879.
