= 1872 United States presidential election in Texas =

- November 5, 1872

Nominee	Horace Greeley	Ulysses S. Grant
Party	Liberal Republican	Republican
Home state	New York	Illinois
Running mate	B. Gratz Brown	Henry Wilson
Popular vote	66,546	47,468
Percentage	57.07%	40.71%
County results
Greeley
50–60%
60–70%
70–80%
80–90%
90–100%
Grant
50–60%
60–70%
70–80%
80–90%
90–100%
President before election
Ulysses S. Grant
Republican
Elected President
Ulysses S. Grant
Republican
- Electoral College vote
- December 17, 1872

8 members of the Electoral College from Texas
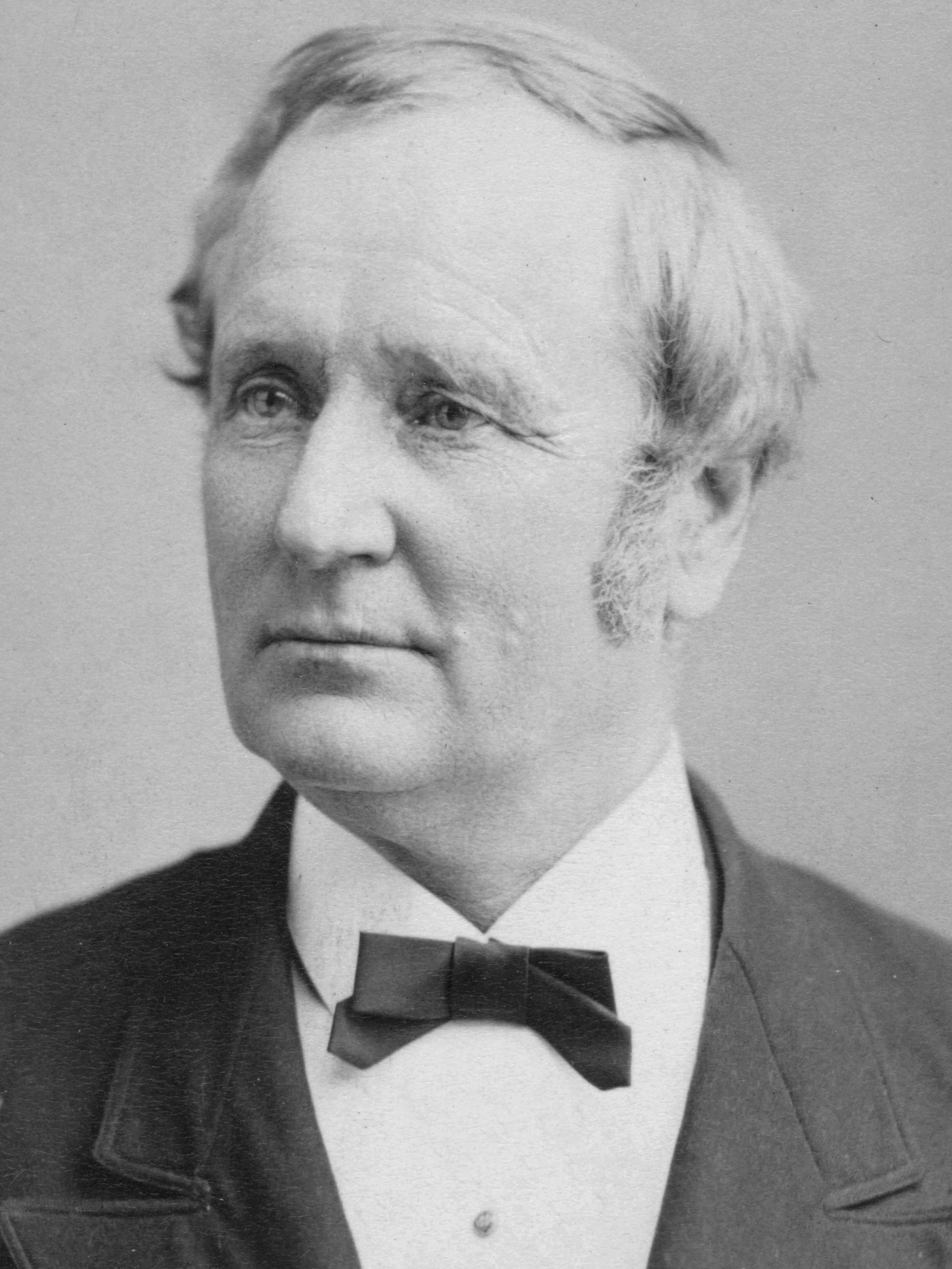
Candidate	Thomas A. Hendricks
Party	Democratic
Home state	Indiana
Running mate	B. Gratz Brown
Electoral vote	8

The 1872 United States presidential election in Texas was held on November 5, 1872, as part of the 1872 United States presidential election. State voters chose eight electors to represent the state in the Electoral College, which chose the president and vice president.

Texas voted for the Liberal Republican nominee Horace Greeley, who received 57% of the vote. However, Greeley died before the electors could cast their votes for president and vice president. Since it was already clear long before Greeley's death that incumbent Republican President Ulysses S. Grant had easily won re-election in any case, Texan electors (along with the electors of five other states) were effectively left free to vote for whoever they chose. All eight electors voted for Thomas A. Hendricks.

This was the first presidential election since 1860 that Texas participated in. It had seceded from the United States in March 1861 and joined the Confederate States of America during the American Civil War. It would not participate in the following elections in 1864 and 1868 and would not be readmitted into the Union until 1870.

This was the first presidential election in Texas in which the Republican nominee was on the ballot. President Grant finished a respectable second with over 40% of the vote, which ultimately stood as the best performance for a Republican candidate for over half a century until Republican Herbert Hoover won the state in 1928 as part of an anti-Catholic surge against Democratic nominee Al Smith.

This remains the only election in which Texas's electoral votes went to a Democrat while neighboring Arkansas voted Republican.

== Results ==
1872 United States presidential election in Texas
Party	Candidate	Votes	Percentage	Electoral votes
Democratic	Thomas A. Hendricks	–	–	8
Liberal Republican	Horace Greeley	66,546	57.07%	0 (Note: Eight electors were pledged to Greeley, who had died after the election, but before the meeting of the Electoral College; these electors voted for Thomas A. Hendricks.)
Republican	Ulysses S. Grant (incumbent)	47,468	40.71%	0
Straight-Out Democrat	Charles O'Conor	2,580	2.21%	0
Total		116,594	100.00%	8

== See also ==
- United States presidential elections in Texas
