= 1872 election =

1872 election may refer to:

- 1872 United States presidential election
- United States House of Representatives elections, 1872
