= Senator Ballantine =

Senator Ballantine may refer to:

- James Ballantine (New York politician) (1855–1896), New York State Senate
- Patrick J. Ballantine (born 1965), North Carolina State Senate
