= Henry Davie =

Henry Davie may refer to:

- Henry Ferguson Davie (1797–1885), British politician and army officer
- Henry Davie (New York politician) (1833–1908), American lawyer and politician from New York
- Harry Davie (1905–1968), Australian rules footballer

== See also ==
- Henry Davy (1793–1865), English landscape painter, engraver and lithographer
