= 1928 United States presidential election in Texas =

- November 6, 1928

Nominee	Herbert Hoover	Al Smith
Party	Republican	Democratic
Home state	California	New York
Running mate	Charles Curtis	Joseph T. Robinson
Electoral vote	20	0
Popular vote	367,036	341,032
Percentage	51.77%	48.10%

Hoover
50–60%
60–70%
70–80%
80–90%
Smith
50–60%
60–70%
70–80%
80–90%
90–100%
President before election
Calvin Coolidge
Republican
Elected President
Herbert Hoover
Republican

The 1928 United States presidential election in Texas took place on November 6, 1928, as part of the 1928 United States presidential election which was held throughout all contemporary forty-eight states. Voters chose 20 representatives, or electors, to the Electoral College, who voted for president and vice president.

Ever since statehood, Texas had been one of the strongest states in the nation for the Democratic Party, owing to its early history as a southern state based around slavery. Even during Reconstruction when African Americans were briefly enfranchised, the Republican Party won just one statewide election. By the time Texas participated in its first postbellum election in 1872, cracks were emerging in Republican Reconstruction plans, so that the Democratic "Redeemers" gained control of Southern legislatures by 1874.

After "Redemption" and the passing of a new constitution in 1876 the GOP became confined largely to areas of abolitionist German "Forty-Eighter" settlement in the Hill Country, and to a few South Texas counties where local Republican bosses could outcompete their Democratic equivalents. The Terrell Election Law created a poll tax that, from 1902, disenfranchised virtually all remaining African-American voters, the vast majority of Mexican Americans, and also most poor whites. Voter turnout among males over twenty-one fell from over eighty percent to under thirty percent following introduction of the poll tax. The period following this disfranchisement nonetheless saw a substantial amount of typically "Progressive" reform under Governors James Stephen Hogg and Thomas M. Campbell, and despite this progressive faction ceding power in 1906 to the conservatives, Texas proved solid in its support for progressive candidate Woodrow Wilson at the 1912 Democratic National Convention. In the meantime, Texas continued to vote solidly Democratic: between 1904 and 1924 no Republican nominee reached 24% of the statewide vote total.

Hoover won Texas by a narrow margin of 3.67 percent. His victory in the state made him the first Republican presidential candidate to carry Texas. (Note: Ironically, 4 years after achieving this historic feat, Hoover would go on to lose Texas by the largest margin of any major candidate in presidential history, losing every county and not even garnering 100,000 votes.) He produced a swing of over 32 percent compared to the vote for Calvin Coolidge in 1924; however, there were huge variations. The traditionally Republican Texas German counties of Comal and Guadalupe, along with the former 1920 Ferguson counties of Lee and Washington voted overwhelmingly for Smith in appreciation of his views on Prohibition: in Comal County, which had been Robert La Follette's strongest nationwide in 1924, the Democratic vote rose from 13 to 78%, thus supporting La Follette's family's endorsement of Smith after he died.

In contrast, numerous Baptist High Plains counties saw Hoover gain over fifty percent relative to Coolidge due to vehement opposition to Catholicism and repeal of Prohibition. Hoover was also helped by a powerful vote from the emerging middle class in Dallas–Fort Worth and Houston: his combined margin in Harris, Dallas and Tarrant Counties was slightly larger than his statewide plurality. East Texas, the earliest-settled region of the state with greatest white resentment of the Republican Party's association with Reconstruction, and South Texas, in which white voters had similar fears of Mexican-American political power, remained normally loyal to Smith.

Texas wouldn't support another Republican presidential candidate until 1952 when Texan-born Dwight D. Eisenhower carried the state. This was the last presidential election until 2024 in which Maverick County voted for the Republican candidate.

This was also the first time a Texas Presidential election had even been decided by single digits, as since statehood the Democratic party had won every election in a blowout, except in 1864 and 1868 when elections were not held. Indeed, during that span Republicans only came within 30% of winning the state once, during the reconstruction landslide of 1872 when Grant lost the state by 16.36%.

== Results ==
1928 United States presidential election in Texas
Party	Candidate	Votes	Percentage	Electoral votes
Republican	Herbert Hoover	367,036	51.77%	20
Democratic	Al Smith	341,032	48.10%	0
Socialist	Norman Thomas	722	0.10%	0
Communist	William Z. Foster	209	0.03%	0
Totals		708,999	100.00%	20
Voter turnout (voting age)				24.8%

=== Results by county ===
1928 United States presidential election in Texas by county
County	Herbert Hoover Republican		Al Smith Democratic		Various candidates Other parties		Margin		Total votes cast
County	#	%	#	%	#	%	#	%	Total votes cast
Anderson	1,814	50.94%	1,747	49.06%	0	0.00%	67	1.88%	3,561
Andrews	66	72.53%	25	27.47%	0	0.00%	41	45.05%	91
Angelina	1,209	34.41%	2,305	65.59%	0	0.00%	-1,096	-31.19%	3,514
Aransas	161	51.44%	152	48.56%	0	0.00%	9	2.88%	313
Archer	799	48.02%	865	51.98%	0	0.00%	-66	-3.97%	1,664
Armstrong	316	45.80%	373	54.06%	1	0.14%	-57	-8.26%	690
Atascosa	888	56.56%	682	43.44%	0	0.00%	206	13.12%	1,570
Austin	466	17.94%	2,129	81.98%	2	0.08%	-1,663	-64.04%	2,597
Bailey	410	74.28%	142	25.72%	0	0.00%	268	48.55%	552
Bandera	936	74.52%	317	25.24%	3	0.24%	619	49.28%	1,256
Bastrop	850	35.65%	1,534	64.35%	0	0.00%	-684	-28.69%	2,384
Baylor	491	38.51%	784	61.49%	0	0.00%	-293	-22.98%	1,275
Bee	1,189	53.18%	1,043	46.65%	4	0.18%	146	6.53%	2,236
Bell	3,366	52.17%	3,079	47.72%	7	0.11%	287	4.45%	6,452
Bexar	16,477	49.69%	16,626	50.14%	57	0.17%	-149	-0.45%	33,160
Blanco	615	53.25%	539	46.67%	1	0.09%	76	6.58%	1,155
Borden	98	57.31%	73	42.69%	0	0.00%	25	14.62%	171
Bosque	1,526	55.19%	1,235	44.67%	4	0.14%	291	10.52%	2,765
Bowie	2,225	42.57%	3,002	57.43%	0	0.00%	-777	-14.87%	5,227
Brazoria	1,588	59.39%	1,086	40.61%	0	0.00%	502	18.77%	2,674
Brazos	738	33.23%	1,480	66.64%	3	0.14%	-742	-33.41%	2,221
Brewster	406	59.36%	273	39.91%	5	0.73%	133	19.44%	684
Briscoe	301	46.96%	336	52.42%	4	0.62%	-35	-5.46%	641
Brooks	160	32.52%	332	67.48%	0	0.00%	-172	-34.96%	492
Brown	2,033	50.46%	1,992	49.44%	4	0.10%	41	1.02%	4,029
Burleson	339	17.87%	1,558	82.13%	0	0.00%	-1,219	-64.26%	1,897
Burnet	936	66.67%	467	33.26%	1	0.07%	469	33.40%	1,404
Caldwell	1,189	49.54%	1,211	50.46%	0	0.00%	-22	-0.92%	2,400
Calhoun	333	46.84%	375	52.74%	3	0.42%	-42	-5.91%	711
Callahan	979	51.02%	940	48.98%	0	0.00%	39	2.03%	1,919
Cameron	3,544	52.45%	3,202	47.39%	11	0.16%	342	5.06%	6,757
Camp	494	43.56%	640	56.44%	0	0.00%	-146	-12.87%	1,134
Carson	891	60.04%	592	39.89%	1	0.07%	299	20.15%	1,484
Cass	1,323	43.79%	1,698	56.21%	0	0.00%	-375	-12.41%	3,021
Castro	319	45.38%	384	54.62%	0	0.00%	-65	-9.25%	703
Chambers	256	51.41%	242	48.59%	0	0.00%	14	2.81%	498
Cherokee	1,933	49.94%	1,938	50.06%	0	0.00%	-5	-0.13%	3,871
Childress	1,438	66.45%	726	33.55%	0	0.00%	712	32.90%	2,164
Clay	1,327	53.36%	1,160	46.64%	0	0.00%	167	6.71%	2,487
Cochran	197	64.38%	109	35.62%	0	0.00%	88	28.76%	306
Coke	450	68.60%	206	31.40%	0	0.00%	244	37.20%	656
Coleman	1,645	53.00%	1,459	47.00%	0	0.00%	186	5.99%	3,104
Collin	3,476	50.55%	3,377	49.11%	23	0.33%	99	1.44%	6,876
Collingsworth	1,179	65.98%	608	34.02%	0	0.00%	571	31.95%	1,787
Colorado	891	33.22%	1,787	66.63%	4	0.15%	-896	-33.41%	2,682
Comal	508	21.14%	1,893	78.78%	2	0.08%	-1,385	-57.64%	2,403
Comanche	1,483	53.08%	1,311	46.92%	0	0.00%	172	6.16%	2,794
Concho	446	50.97%	426	48.69%	3	0.34%	20	2.29%	875
Cooke	2,262	53.99%	1,924	45.92%	4	0.10%	338	8.07%	4,190
Coryell	1,123	46.21%	1,306	53.74%	1	0.04%	-183	-7.53%	2,430
Cottle	473	51.19%	451	48.81%	0	0.00%	22	2.38%	924
Crane	127	44.41%	159	55.59%	0	0.00%	-32	-11.19%	286
Crockett	291	81.97%	64	18.03%	0	0.00%	227	63.94%	355
Crosby	1,004	57.97%	728	42.03%	0	0.00%	276	15.94%	1,732
Culberson	72	45.86%	85	54.14%	0	0.00%	-13	-8.28%	157
Dallam	618	53.00%	539	46.23%	9	0.77%	79	6.78%	1,166
Dallas	27,272	60.89%	17,437	38.93%	78	0.17%	9,835	21.96%	44,787
Dawson	1,448	77.23%	427	22.77%	0	0.00%	1,021	54.45%	1,875
Deaf Smith	570	58.10%	411	41.90%	0	0.00%	159	16.21%	981
Delta	753	43.96%	958	55.93%	2	0.12%	-205	-11.97%	1,713
Denton	2,587	51.89%	2,384	47.81%	15	0.30%	203	4.07%	4,986
DeWitt	1,142	41.66%	1,594	58.15%	5	0.18%	-452	-16.49%	2,741
Dickens	741	64.10%	415	35.90%	0	0.00%	326	28.20%	1,156
Dimmit	626	70.81%	258	29.19%	0	0.00%	368	41.63%	884
Donley	1,092	68.90%	491	30.98%	2	0.13%	601	37.92%	1,585
Duval	434	25.85%	1,245	74.15%	0	0.00%	-811	-48.30%	1,679
Eastland	3,233	56.38%	2,501	43.62%	0	0.00%	732	12.77%	5,734
Ector	168	52.66%	151	47.34%	0	0.00%	17	5.33%	319
Edwards	546	89.66%	59	9.69%	4	0.66%	487	79.97%	609
Ellis	3,569	44.72%	4,399	55.12%	13	0.16%	-830	-10.40%	7,981
El Paso	6,050	49.74%	6,114	50.26%	0	0.00%	-64	-0.53%	12,164
Erath	1,923	56.94%	1,372	40.63%	82	2.43%	551	16.32%	3,377
Falls	877	26.04%	2,484	73.75%	7	0.21%	-1,607	-47.71%	3,368
Fannin	2,122	45.62%	2,525	54.29%	4	0.09%	-403	-8.66%	4,651
Fayette	689	15.87%	3,647	84.01%	5	0.12%	-2,958	-68.14%	4,341
Fisher	1,259	60.07%	837	39.93%	0	0.00%	422	20.13%	2,096
Floyd	1,176	63.84%	666	36.16%	0	0.00%	510	27.69%	1,842
Foard	430	47.51%	466	51.49%	9	0.99%	-36	-3.98%	905
Fort Bend	631	26.77%	1,724	73.14%	2	0.08%	-1,093	-46.37%	2,357
Franklin	386	35.12%	713	64.88%	0	0.00%	-327	-29.75%	1,099
Freestone	1,178	47.14%	1,318	52.74%	3	0.12%	-140	-5.60%	2,499
Frio	673	72.21%	258	27.68%	1	0.11%	415	44.53%	932
Gaines	312	69.03%	140	30.97%	0	0.00%	172	38.05%	452
Galveston	4,401	42.43%	5,951	57.38%	20	0.19%	-1,550	-14.94%	10,372
Garza	794	73.59%	285	26.41%	0	0.00%	509	47.17%	1,079
Gillespie	1,447	55.12%	1,174	44.72%	4	0.15%	273	10.40%	2,625
Glasscock	124	78.48%	34	21.52%	0	0.00%	90	56.96%	158
Goliad	554	54.10%	468	45.70%	2	0.20%	86	8.40%	1,024
Gonzales	1,112	45.74%	1,319	54.26%	0	0.00%	-207	-8.52%	2,431
Gray	1,871	65.35%	986	34.44%	6	0.21%	885	30.91%	2,863
Grayson	6,277	57.63%	4,600	42.23%	15	0.14%	1,677	15.40%	10,892
Gregg	646	39.29%	996	60.58%	2	0.12%	-350	-21.29%	1,644
Grimes	701	37.37%	1,175	62.63%	0	0.00%	-474	-25.27%	1,876
Guadalupe	1,442	43.46%	1,872	56.42%	4	0.12%	-430	-12.96%	3,318
Hale	2,143	65.98%	1,098	33.81%	7	0.22%	1,045	32.17%	3,248
Hall	1,409	74.08%	493	25.92%	0	0.00%	916	48.16%	1,902
Hamilton	927	48.38%	989	51.62%	0	0.00%	-62	-3.24%	1,916
Hansford	417	56.58%	319	43.28%	1	0.14%	98	13.30%	737
Hardeman	1,333	59.43%	910	40.57%	0	0.00%	423	18.86%	2,243
Hardin	951	47.96%	1,032	52.04%	0	0.00%	-81	-4.08%	1,983
Harris	27,188	55.70%	21,536	44.12%	86	0.18%	5,652	11.58%	48,810
Harrison	1,776	46.69%	2,023	53.18%	5	0.13%	-247	-6.49%	3,804
Hartley	179	52.34%	163	47.66%	0	0.00%	16	4.68%	342
Haskell	1,430	48.08%	1,532	51.51%	12	0.40%	-102	-3.43%	2,974
Hays	1,088	63.70%	620	36.30%	0	0.00%	468	27.40%	1,708
Hemphill	489	60.67%	317	39.33%	0	0.00%	172	21.34%	806
Henderson	1,128	39.52%	1,726	60.48%	0	0.00%	-598	-20.95%	2,854
Hidalgo	4,285	51.41%	4,034	48.40%	16	0.19%	251	3.01%	8,335
Hill	2,446	50.34%	2,413	49.66%	0	0.00%	33	0.68%	4,859
Hockley	765	75.82%	235	23.29%	9	0.89%	530	52.53%	1,009
Hood	640	57.09%	479	42.73%	2	0.18%	161	14.36%	1,121
Hopkins	1,767	48.85%	1,845	51.01%	5	0.14%	-78	-2.16%	3,617
Houston	763	36.35%	1,336	63.65%	0	0.00%	-573	-27.30%	2,099
Howard	812	54.86%	665	44.93%	3	0.20%	147	9.93%	1,480
Hudspeth	123	51.25%	117	48.75%	0	0.00%	6	2.50%	240
Hunt	3,009	46.16%	3,510	53.84%	0	0.00%	-501	-7.69%	6,519
Hutchinson	1,115	60.43%	730	39.57%	0	0.00%	385	20.87%	1,845
Irion	259	68.52%	119	31.48%	0	0.00%	140	37.04%	378
Jack	1,068	70.22%	450	29.59%	3	0.20%	618	40.63%	1,521
Jackson	572	54.68%	473	45.22%	1	0.10%	99	9.46%	1,046
Jasper	611	40.44%	898	59.43%	2	0.13%	-287	-18.99%	1,511
Jeff Davis	157	58.15%	112	41.48%	1	0.37%	45	16.67%	270
Jefferson	9,209	56.74%	7,006	43.16%	16	0.10%	2,203	13.57%	16,231
Jim Hogg	109	29.30%	263	70.70%	0	0.00%	-154	-41.40%	372
Jim Wells	423	36.06%	747	63.68%	3	0.26%	-324	-27.62%	1,173
Johnson	3,181	61.58%	1,981	38.35%	4	0.08%	1,200	23.23%	5,166
Jones	1,995	55.95%	1,563	43.83%	8	0.22%	432	12.11%	3,566
Karnes	855	44.83%	1,052	55.17%	0	0.00%	-197	-10.33%	1,907
Kaufman	1,718	39.27%	2,657	60.73%	0	0.00%	-939	-21.46%	4,375
Kendall	663	63.63%	377	36.18%	2	0.19%	286	27.45%	1,042
Kenedy	12	9.23%	118	90.77%	0	0.00%	-106	-81.54%	130
Kent	363	69.01%	163	30.99%	0	0.00%	200	38.02%	526
Kerr	1,575	73.36%	570	26.55%	2	0.09%	1,005	46.81%	2,147
Kimble	660	80.39%	157	19.12%	4	0.49%	503	61.27%	821
King	85	65.38%	45	34.62%	0	0.00%	40	30.77%	130
Kinney	182	47.64%	200	52.36%	0	0.00%	-18	-4.71%	382
Kleberg	751	51.94%	695	48.06%	0	0.00%	56	3.87%	1,446
Knox	992	55.70%	784	44.02%	5	0.28%	208	11.68%	1,781
Lamar	2,887	57.08%	2,163	42.76%	8	0.16%	724	14.31%	5,058
Lamb	1,266	74.21%	440	25.79%	0	0.00%	826	48.42%	1,706
Lampasas	899	60.91%	567	38.41%	10	0.68%	332	22.49%	1,476
La Salle	327	40.57%	479	59.43%	0	0.00%	-152	-18.86%	806
Lavaca	911	24.27%	2,842	75.73%	0	0.00%	-1,931	-51.45%	3,753
Lee	449	27.63%	1,176	72.37%	0	0.00%	-727	-44.74%	1,625
Leon	543	38.59%	862	61.27%	2	0.14%	-319	-22.67%	1,407
Liberty	1,070	53.63%	918	46.02%	7	0.35%	152	7.62%	1,995
Limestone	1,642	38.64%	2,608	61.36%	0	0.00%	-966	-22.73%	4,250
Lipscomb	776	69.35%	331	29.58%	12	1.07%	445	39.77%	1,119
Live Oak	484	55.82%	383	44.18%	0	0.00%	101	11.65%	867
Llano	439	46.07%	514	53.93%	0	0.00%	-75	-7.87%	953
Loving	6	37.50%	10	62.50%	0	0.00%	-4	-25.00%	16
Lubbock	3,079	60.79%	1,979	39.07%	7	0.14%	1,100	21.72%	5,065
Lynn	1,268	62.49%	754	37.16%	7	0.34%	514	25.33%	2,029
McCulloch	1,294	63.59%	741	36.41%	0	0.00%	553	27.17%	2,035
McLennan	5,744	51.81%	5,330	48.07%	13	0.12%	414	3.73%	11,087
McMullen	96	50.00%	94	48.96%	2	1.04%	2	1.04%	192
Madison	364	44.61%	452	55.39%	0	0.00%	-88	-10.78%	816
Marion	443	40.90%	640	59.10%	0	0.00%	-197	-18.19%	1,083
Martin	330	60.77%	213	39.23%	0	0.00%	117	21.55%	543
Mason	807	76.64%	244	23.17%	2	0.19%	563	53.47%	1,053
Matagorda	1,194	58.85%	829	40.86%	6	0.30%	365	17.99%	2,029
Maverick	311	63.34%	180	36.66%	0	0.00%	131	26.68%	491
Medina	1,243	46.94%	1,400	52.87%	5	0.19%	-157	-5.93%	2,648
Menard	589	71.57%	234	28.43%	0	0.00%	355	43.13%	823
Midland	347	49.57%	350	50.00%	3	0.43%	-3	-0.43%	700
Milam	1,270	30.86%	2,842	69.05%	4	0.10%	-1,572	-38.19%	4,116
Mills	774	63.65%	442	36.35%	0	0.00%	332	27.30%	1,216
Mitchell	1,099	59.57%	746	40.43%	0	0.00%	353	19.13%	1,845
Montague	1,519	51.13%	1,452	48.87%	0	0.00%	67	2.26%	2,971
Montgomery	613	40.36%	905	59.58%	1	0.07%	-292	-19.22%	1,519
Moore	87	41.23%	124	58.77%	0	0.00%	-37	-17.54%	211
Morris	287	26.90%	780	73.10%	0	0.00%	-493	-46.20%	1,067
Motley	450	56.32%	349	43.68%	0	0.00%	101	12.64%	799
Nacogdoches	822	30.41%	1,879	69.52%	2	0.07%	-1,057	-39.10%	2,703
Navarro	3,341	47.80%	3,648	52.20%	0	0.00%	-307	-4.39%	6,989
Newton	397	41.27%	564	58.63%	1	0.10%	-167	-17.36%	962
Nolan	1,475	58.76%	1,035	41.24%	0	0.00%	440	17.53%	2,510
Nueces	2,481	45.36%	2,985	54.58%	3	0.05%	-504	-9.22%	5,469
Ochiltree	556	67.31%	270	32.69%	0	0.00%	286	34.62%	826
Oldham	172	52.28%	157	47.72%	0	0.00%	15	4.56%	329
Orange	919	42.43%	1,247	57.57%	0	0.00%	-328	-15.14%	2,166
Palo Pinto	2,001	63.28%	1,161	36.72%	0	0.00%	840	26.57%	3,162
Panola	420	24.21%	1,312	75.62%	3	0.17%	-892	-51.41%	1,735
Parker	2,178	66.24%	1,110	33.76%	0	0.00%	1,068	32.48%	3,288
Parmer	620	65.75%	315	33.40%	8	0.85%	305	32.34%	943
Pecos	524	47.99%	562	51.47%	6	0.55%	-38	-3.48%	1,092
Polk	508	33.73%	994	66.00%	4	0.27%	-486	-32.27%	1,506
Potter	3,627	57.90%	2,637	42.10%	0	0.00%	990	15.80%	6,264
Presidio	254	44.64%	315	55.36%	0	0.00%	-61	-10.72%	569
Rains	202	26.90%	544	72.44%	5	0.67%	-342	-45.54%	751
Randall	733	52.66%	659	47.34%	0	0.00%	74	5.32%	1,392
Reagan	387	62.82%	229	37.18%	0	0.00%	158	25.65%	616
Real	479	83.02%	98	16.98%	0	0.00%	381	66.03%	577
Red River	1,172	41.30%	1,666	58.70%	0	0.00%	-494	-17.41%	2,838
Reeves	344	46.61%	394	53.39%	0	0.00%	-50	-6.78%	738
Refugio	383	36.34%	671	63.66%	0	0.00%	-288	-27.32%	1,054
Roberts	243	70.03%	104	29.97%	0	0.00%	139	40.06%	347
Robertson	751	33.54%	1,487	66.41%	1	0.04%	-736	-32.87%	2,239
Rockwall	289	25.37%	850	74.63%	0	0.00%	-561	-49.25%	1,139
Runnels	1,645	52.26%	1,494	47.46%	9	0.29%	151	4.80%	3,148
Rusk	1,033	37.36%	1,732	62.64%	0	0.00%	-699	-25.28%	2,765
Sabine	419	34.18%	807	65.82%	0	0.00%	-388	-31.65%	1,226
San Augustine	467	36.26%	821	63.74%	0	0.00%	-354	-27.48%	1,288
San Jacinto	296	37.00%	503	62.88%	1	0.13%	-207	-25.88%	800
San Patricio	1,388	70.56%	579	29.44%	0	0.00%	809	41.13%	1,967
San Saba	682	47.56%	752	52.44%	0	0.00%	-70	-4.88%	1,434
Schleicher	227	62.36%	137	37.64%	0	0.00%	90	24.73%	364
Scurry	1,597	77.49%	462	22.42%	2	0.10%	1,135	55.07%	2,061
Shackelford	558	51.10%	533	48.81%	1	0.09%	25	2.29%	1,092
Shelby	676	25.53%	1,961	74.06%	11	0.42%	-1,285	-48.53%	2,648
Sherman	248	64.42%	137	35.58%	0	0.00%	111	28.83%	385
Smith	3,493	59.85%	2,343	40.15%	0	0.00%	1,150	19.71%	5,836
Somervell	241	63.93%	136	36.07%	0	0.00%	105	27.85%	377
Starr	79	9.69%	736	90.31%	0	0.00%	-657	-80.61%	815
Stephens	1,789	60.60%	1,163	39.40%	0	0.00%	626	21.21%	2,952
Sterling	122	42.21%	167	57.79%	0	0.00%	-45	-15.57%	289
Stonewall	442	46.92%	500	53.08%	0	0.00%	-58	-6.16%	942
Sutton	290	75.92%	92	24.08%	0	0.00%	198	51.83%	382
Swisher	887	70.34%	374	29.66%	0	0.00%	513	40.68%	1,261
Tarrant	20,481	68.99%	9,208	31.01%	0	0.00%	11,273	37.97%	29,689
Taylor	4,050	68.07%	1,891	31.78%	9	0.15%	2,159	36.29%	5,950
Terrell	364	80.71%	85	18.85%	2	0.44%	279	61.86%	451
Terry	622	60.45%	407	39.55%	0	0.00%	215	20.89%	1,029
Throckmorton	703	69.81%	304	30.19%	0	0.00%	399	39.62%	1,007
Titus	469	28.99%	1,149	71.01%	0	0.00%	-680	-42.03%	1,618
Tom Green	2,618	63.11%	1,528	36.84%	2	0.05%	1,090	26.28%	4,148
Travis	4,847	51.83%	4,487	47.98%	17	0.18%	360	3.85%	9,351
Trinity	456	39.93%	686	60.07%	0	0.00%	-230	-20.14%	1,142
Tyler	298	30.88%	666	69.02%	1	0.10%	-368	-38.13%	965
Upshur	649	29.37%	1,553	70.27%	8	0.36%	-904	-40.90%	2,210
Upton	270	58.82%	189	41.18%	0	0.00%	81	17.65%	459
Uvalde	1,224	62.10%	747	37.90%	0	0.00%	477	24.20%	1,971
Val Verde	854	57.94%	620	42.06%	0	0.00%	234	15.88%	1,474
Van Zandt	1,502	45.35%	1,789	54.02%	21	0.63%	-287	-8.67%	3,312
Victoria	663	27.94%	1,710	72.06%	0	0.00%	-1,047	-44.12%	2,373
Walker	488	39.51%	747	60.49%	0	0.00%	-259	-20.97%	1,235
Waller	376	42.68%	504	57.21%	1	0.11%	-128	-14.53%	881
Ward	216	45.76%	256	54.24%	0	0.00%	-40	-8.47%	472
Washington	275	9.94%	2,491	90.06%	0	0.00%	-2,216	-80.12%	2,766
Webb	767	32.16%	1,615	67.71%	3	0.13%	-848	-35.56%	2,385
Wharton	1,151	42.69%	1,545	57.31%	0	0.00%	-394	-14.61%	2,696
Wheeler	1,038	57.86%	750	41.81%	6	0.33%	288	16.05%	1,794
Wichita	7,226	59.82%	4,853	40.18%	0	0.00%	2,373	19.65%	12,079
Wilbarger	1,590	52.30%	1,447	47.60%	3	0.10%	143	4.70%	3,040
Willacy	389	49.55%	396	50.45%	0	0.00%	-7	-0.89%	785
Williamson	1,833	33.14%	3,689	66.70%	9	0.16%	-1,856	-33.56%	5,531
Wilson	622	29.33%	1,499	70.67%	0	0.00%	-877	-41.35%	2,121
Winkler	162	34.32%	310	65.68%	0	0.00%	-148	-31.36%	472
Wise	2,141	66.20%	1,093	33.80%	0	0.00%	1,048	32.41%	3,234
Wood	1,161	41.38%	1,645	58.62%	0	0.00%	-484	-17.25%	2,806
Yoakum	86	56.58%	66	43.42%	0	0.00%	20	13.16%	152
Young	1,826	58.88%	1,275	41.12%	0	0.00%	551	17.77%	3,101
Zapata	19	6.03%	296	93.97%	0	0.00%	-277	-87.94%	315
Zavala	571	71.38%	229	28.63%	0	0.00%	342	42.75%	800
Totals	372,324	51.88%	344,542	48.00%	867	0.12%	27,782	3.87%	717,733

== Analysis ==
However, with all other prominent Democrats sitting the election out, the party nominated Al Smith, four-term Governor of New York as its nominee for 1928, with little opposition, despite disagreement among Texas Democrats like Governor Moody, plus "Pa" and "Ma" Ferguson. Smith had been the favorite for the 1924 nomination, but had lost due to opposition to his Catholic faith and "wet" views on Prohibition: he wished to repeal or modify the Volstead Act.

Once Smith was nominated – despite his attempt to dispel fears by nominating "dry" Southern Democrat Joseph T. Robinson as his running mate – extreme fear ensued in the South, which mostly had little to no experience of the Catholic immigrants from southern and eastern Europe who were Smith's local constituency. Southern fundamentalist Protestants believed that Smith would allow papal and priestly leadership in the United States, which Protestantism was a reaction against. There was also much opposition to Smith's support for repealing Prohibition, most notably from minister J. Frank Norris, who became the center of the anti-Smith campaign, saying that

Texas is the battleground for this, the most titanic struggle in the political, moral and religious life of the nation.

The Southern Baptist Convention similarly said that

We enter into a sacred covenant and solemn pledge that we will support for the office of President, or any other office, only such men as stand for our present order of prohibition.

Smith's campaign managers responded to this criticism by saying that the "Hoovercrats" were "Republicans, Klansmen and Bolsheviks".

== See also ==
- United States presidential elections in Texas
