= Henry Davie (New York politician) =

American politician

Henry Davie (August 3, 1833 – October 12, 1908) was an American lawyer and politician from New York.

== Life ==
Davie was born on August 3, 1833, in Delhi, New York.

Davie attended Delaware Academy. He studied law under Judge William Murphy and was admitted to the bar in 1869. He then practiced law in the village of Delhi and formed a partnership with his brother-in-law Judge Daniel T. Arbuckle. The partnership lasted from 1872 until Arbuckle's death in 1894. He was also a director of the Delaware National Bank.

Davie was justice of the peace from 1860 to 1865 and postmaster from 1887 to 1890. In 1890, he was elected to the New York State Assembly as a Democrat, representing Delaware County. He served in the Assembly in 1891. He was initially a Republican until 1872, when he supported the Horace Greeley campaign and became a Democrat.

Davie was a board member of the Delhi First Presbyterian Church, a member of the local board of education, and a trustee of the Delaware Academy. In 1870, he married Susan F. Peters of Bloomville. They had an adopted daughter, Ida.

Davie died at home on October 12, 1908. He was buried in Woodland Cemetery.

New York State Assembly
Preceded by James Ballantine	New York State Assembly; Delaware County; 1891	Succeeded by James R. Cowan
