= 1872 United States presidential election in Louisiana =

- November 5, 1872
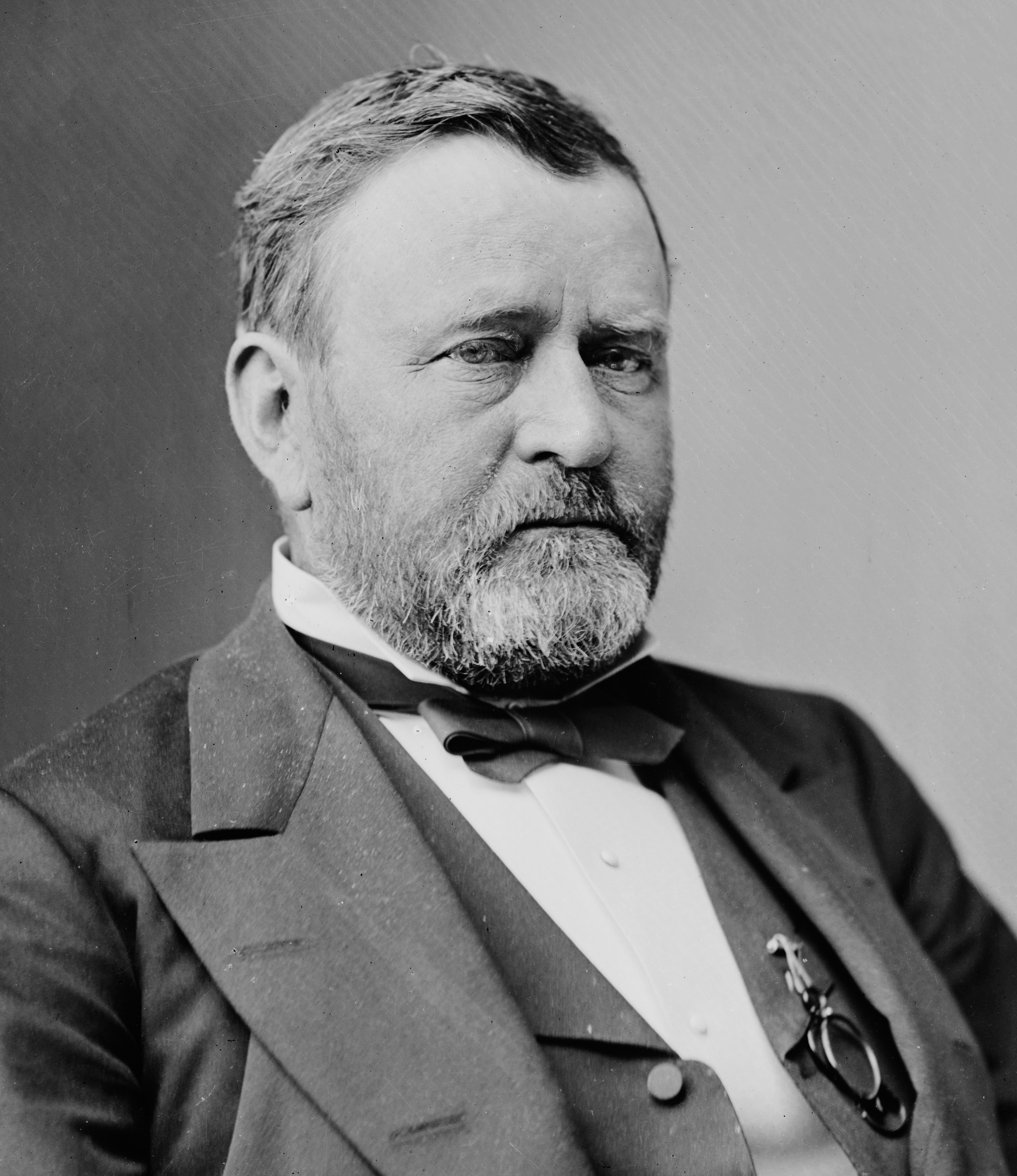

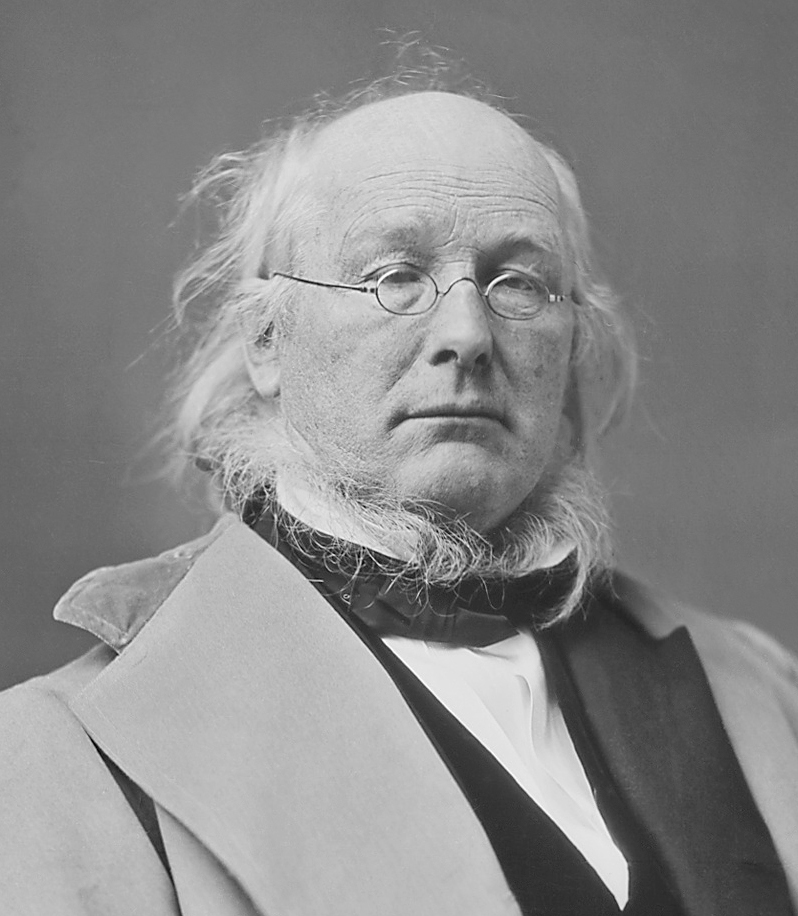
| Nominee | Ulysses S. Grant | Horace Greeley |
| Party | Republican | Liberal Republican |
| Home state | Illinois | New York |
| Running mate | Henry Wilson | B. Gratz Brown |
| Electoral vote | none (8 elected) | 0 |
| Popular vote | 71,663 | 57,029 |
| Percentage | 55.69% | 44.31% |
Parish results
Grant
50–60%
60–70%
70–80%
80–90%
90–100%
Greeley
50–60%
60–70%
70–80%
80–90%
90–100%
President before election
Ulysses S. Grant
Republican
Elected President
Ulysses S. Grant
Republican

The 1872 United States presidential election in Louisiana took place on November 5, 1872, as part of the 1872 United States presidential election. Voters chose eight representatives, or electors to the Electoral College, who voted for president and vice president.

Louisiana voted for the Republican candidate, Ulysses S. Grant, over Liberal Republican candidate Horace Greeley. Grant won Louisiana by a margin of 11.38%. However, due to the turbulent conditions of Reconstruction, along with various irregularities and allegations of electoral fraud, Congress rejected Louisiana's eight electoral votes. Neighboring Arkansas's electoral votes were also rejected.

== Results ==
1872 United States presidential election in Louisiana
| Party | Candidate | Running mate | Popular vote | | Electoral vote | |
| Party | Candidate | Running mate | Count | % | Count | % |
|---|---|---|---|---|---|---|
| Republican | Ulysses S. Grant of Illinois | Henry Wilson of Massachusetts | 71,663 | 55.69% | 0 (8 elected) | 0.00% |
| Liberal Republican | Horace Greeley of New York | Benjamin Gratz Brown of Missouri | 57,029 | 44.31% | 0 | 0.00% |
| Total | | | 128,692 | 100.00% | 0 | 0.00% |

== See also ==
- United States presidential elections in Louisiana
