= 1872 United States presidential election in West Virginia =

- November 5, 1872
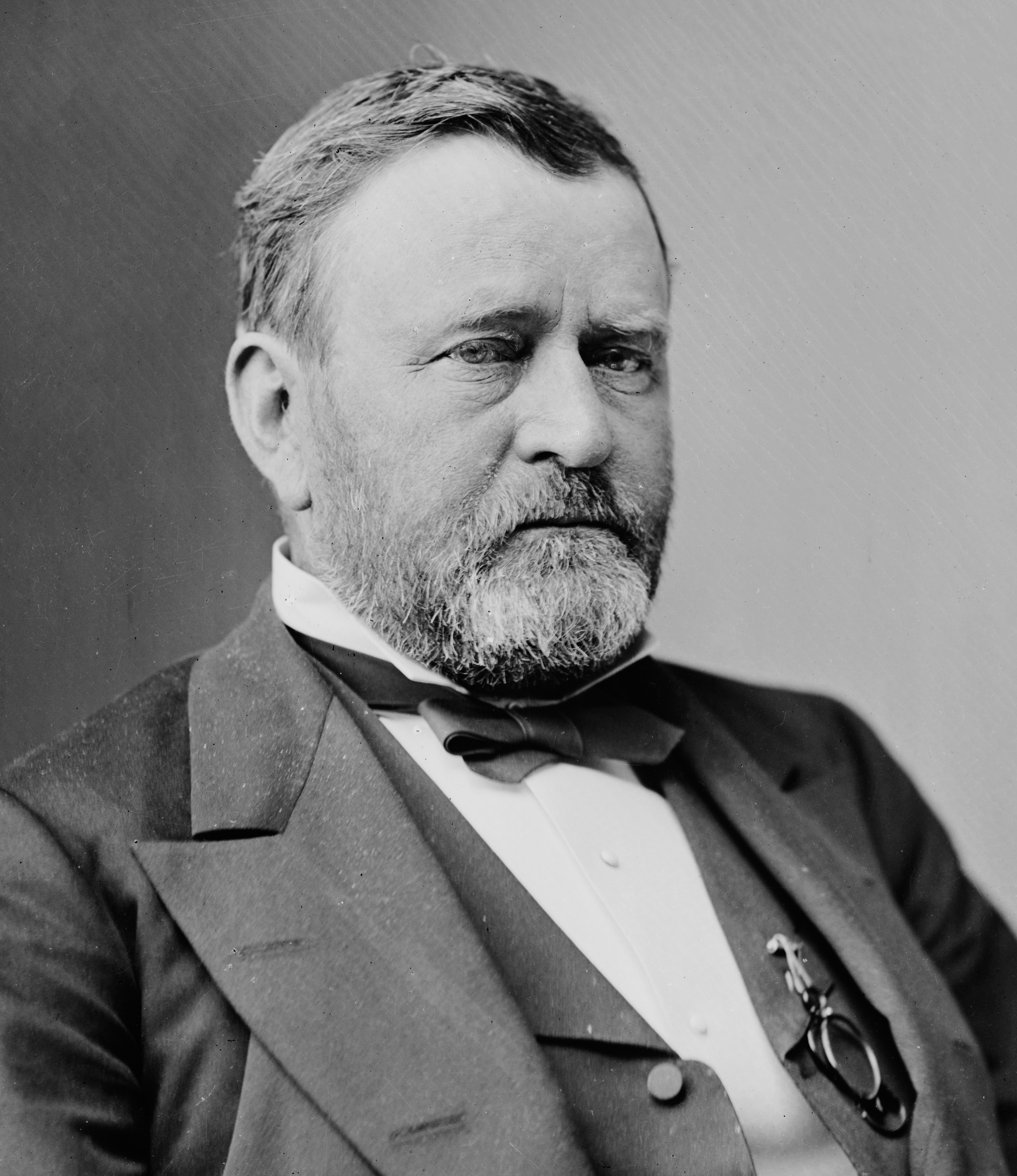

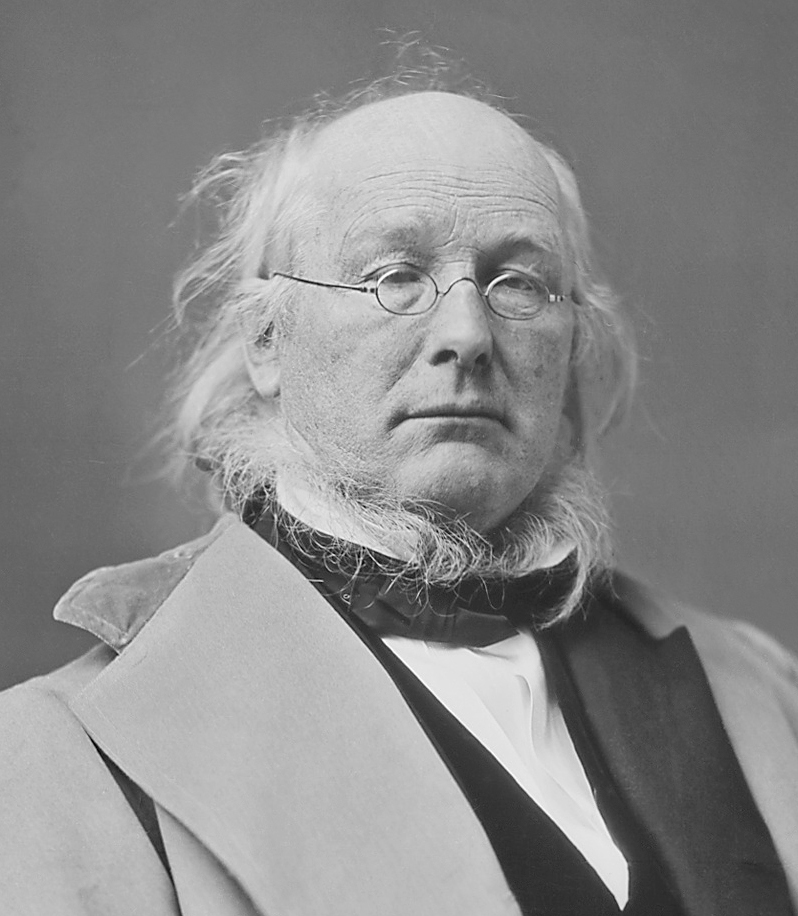
Nominee	Ulysses S. Grant	Horace Greeley
Party	Republican	Liberal Republican
Home state	Illinois	New York
Running mate	Henry Wilson	Benjamin G. Brown
Electoral vote	5	0
Popular vote	32,320	29,532
Percentage	51.74%	47.28%
County results
Grant
50–60%
60–70%
70–80%
Greeley
50–60%
60–70%
70–80%
80–90%
President before election
Ulysses S. Grant
Republican
Elected President
Ulysses S. Grant
Republican

The 1872 United States presidential election in West Virginia took place on November 5, 1872. All contemporary 37 states were part of the 1872 United States presidential election. The state voters chose five electors to the Electoral College, which selected the president and vice president.

West Virginia was won by the Republican nominees, incumbent President Ulysses S. Grant of Illinois and his running mate Senator Henry Wilson of Massachusetts. Grant and Wilson defeated the Liberal Republican and Democratic nominees, former Congressman Horace Greeley of New York and his running mate former Senator and Governor Benjamin Gratz Brown of Missouri by a margin of 4.46%.

== Results ==
1872 United States presidential election in West Virginia
Party	Candidate	Running mate	Popular vote		Electoral vote	
Party	Candidate	Running mate	Count	%	Count	%
Republican	Ulysses S. Grant of Illinois	Henry Wilson of Massachusetts	32,320	51.74%	5	100.00%
Liberal Republican	Horace Greeley of New York	Benjamin Gratz Brown of Missouri	29,532	47.28%	0	0.00%
Bourbon Democrat	Charles O'Conor	John Quincy Adams II	615	0.98%	0	0.00%
Total			62467	100.00%	5	100.00%

== See also ==
- United States presidential elections in West Virginia
