= 1872 United States presidential election =

Re-election of Ulysses S. Grant

- November 5, 1872

352 members (Note: Elections were held in Arkansas and Louisiana; however, due to various irregularities including allegations of electoral fraud, all electoral votes from those states (6 and 8, respectively) were invalidated.) of the Electoral College 177 electoral votes needed to win
- Turnout: 72.1% (▼8.8 pp)

| Nominee | Ulysses S. Grant | Horace Greeley (Died November 29, 1872) |
| Party | Republican | Liberal Republican |
| Alliance | | Democratic |
| Home state | Illinois | New York |
| Running mate | Henry Wilson | B. Gratz Brown |
| Electoral vote | 286 (+14 invalidated) | 0 (+3 rejected) (Note: Greeley died after the election, but prior to the Electoral College meeting. Greeley had won 66 pledged electors from 6 states, of which 63 cast their votes for other candidates. 3 Georgian electors voted for Greeley; however, their votes were rejected.) |
| States carried | 29 (+2 invalidated) | 6 |
| Popular vote | 3,598,235 | 2,834,976 |
| Percentage | 55.6% | 43.8% |
- Presidential election results map. Red denotes states won by Grant/Wilson (Republican). Other colors (except gray) denote states won by Greeley/Brown (Liberal Republican and Democratic). The different colors reflect the posthumous scattering of Greeley's electoral votes: Magenta denotes Electoral College votes won by Greeley, Blue denotes those won by Thomas A. Hendricks, Pink denotes those won by Benjamin Gratz Brown, Dark Green denotes those won by Charles J. Jenkins, and Crimson denotes those won by David Davis. Numbers indicate the number of electoral votes allotted to each state.
President before election
Ulysses S. Grant
Republican
Elected President
Ulysses S. Grant
Republican

A presidential election was held in the United States on November 5, 1872. Incumbent President Ulysses S. Grant, the Republican nominee, handily defeated Democratic-endorsed Liberal Republican nominee Horace Greeley.

Grant was unanimously re-nominated at the 1872 Republican National Convention, but his intra-party opponents organized the Liberal Republican Party and held their own convention. The 1872 Liberal Republican convention nominated Greeley, a New York newspaper publisher, and wrote a platform calling for civil service reform and an end to Reconstruction. Democratic Party leaders believed that their only hope of defeating Grant was to unite around Greeley, and the 1872 Democratic National Convention nominated the Liberal Republican ticket.

Despite the union between the Liberal Republicans and Democrats, Greeley proved to be an ineffective campaigner and Grant remained widely popular. Grant decisively won re-election, carrying 31 of the 37 states, including several Southern states that would not again vote Republican until the 20th century. Grant was the last incumbent to win a second consecutive term until William McKinley's victory in the 1900 presidential election, (Note: Grover Cleveland was elected to a second non-consecutive term in 1892, after losing his re-election campaign in 1888.) and his popular vote margin of 11.8% was the largest margin between 1856 and 1904.

On November 29, 1872, after the popular vote was counted, but before the Electoral College cast its votes, Greeley died. As a result, electors previously committed to Greeley voted for four candidates for president and eight candidates for vice president. The election of 1872 also remains the only instance in U.S. history in which a major presidential candidate who won electoral votes died during the election process. This election set the record for the longest Republican popular vote win streak in American history, four elections, a record that was matched by the same party in 1908. In terms of electoral votes, it was improved with a fifth and sixth consecutive victory in 1876 and 1880. Grant became the only president to serve two full, consecutive terms between Andrew Jackson (1829–1837) and Woodrow Wilson (1913–1921), and was the first and only Republican to serve two full terms until Dwight D. Eisenhower (1953–1961). (Note: Only four Republican presidents have served two full terms in office: Grant, Eisenhower, Ronald Reagan, and George W. Bush. Three other Republican presidents: Abraham Lincoln, William McKinley, and Richard Nixon, were also re-elected to their second term, but both Lincoln and McKinley were assassinated in 1865 and 1901, respectively, while Nixon resigned in 1974 before the completion of his second term. Donald Trump has also been re-elected to a second, non-consecutive term.)

== Nominations ==
=== Republican Party nomination ===
1872 Republican Party ticket
| Ulysses S. Grant | Henry Wilson |
| for President | for Vice President |
| 18th President of the United States (1869–1877) | U.S. Senator from Massachusetts (1855–1873) |

At the convention the Republicans nominated President Ulysses S. Grant for re-election, but nominated Senator Henry Wilson from Massachusetts for vice president instead of the incumbent Schuyler Colfax, although both were implicated in the Crédit Mobilier scandal which erupted two months after the Republican convention. Others, who had grown weary of the corruption of the Grant administration, bolted to form the Liberal Republican Party.

=== The opposition fusion nominations ===
In the hope of defeating Grant, the Democratic Party endorsed the nominees of the Liberal Republican Party.

==== Liberal Republican Party nomination ====
An influential group of dissident Republicans split from the party to form the Liberal Republican Party in 1870. At the party's only national convention, held in Cincinnati in 1872, New York Tribune editor and former representative Horace Greeley defeated Charles Francis Adams Sr. on the sixth ballot, winning the nomination for president. Missouri Governor Benjamin Gratz Brown was nominated for vice president on the second ballot.

1872 Liberal Republican Party ticket
| Horace Greeley | Benjamin Gratz Brown |
| for President | for Vice President |
| U.S. Representative for New York's 6th (1848–1849) | 20th Governor of Missouri (1871–1873) |
Campaign

Candidates in this section are sorted by their highest vote count on the nominating ballots
| Charles Francis Adams Sr. | Lyman Trumbull | Benjamin Gratz Brown | David Davis | Andrew Gregg Curtin | Salmon P. Chase |
| Fmr. Envoy to the United Kingdom from Massachusetts (1861–1868) | U.S. Senator from Illinois (1855–1873) | 20th Governor of Missouri (1871–1873) | Associate Justice from Illinois (1862–1877) | Fmr. Envoy to Russia from Pennsylvania (1869–1872) | Chief Justice from Ohio (1864–1873) |
| 324 votes | 156 votes | 95 votes | 93 votes | 62 votes | 32 votes |

==== Democratic Party nomination ====
1872 Democratic Party ticket
| Horace Greeley | Benjamin Gratz Brown |
| for President | for Vice President |
| U.S. Representative for New York's 6th (1848–1849) | 20th Governor of Missouri (1871–1873) |

The Convention met in Baltimore, Maryland, on July 9–10. Because of its strong desire to defeat Ulysses S. Grant, the Democratic Party also nominated the Liberal Republicans' Greeley/Brown ticket and adopted their platform. Greeley received 686 of the 732 delegate votes cast, while Brown received 713. Accepting the Liberal platform meant the Democrats had accepted the New Departure strategy, which rejected the anti-Reconstruction platform of 1868. They realized that to win the election they had to look forward, and not try to re-fight the Civil War. They also realized that they would only split the anti-Grant vote if they nominated a candidate other than Greeley. However, Greeley's long reputation as the most aggressive antagonist of the Democratic Party, its principles, its leadership, and its activists, cooled Democrats' enthusiasm for the presidential nominee.

Some Democrats were worried that backing Greeley would effectively bring the party to extinction, much like how the moribund Whig Party had been doomed by endorsing the Know Nothing candidacy of Millard Fillmore in 1856, though others felt that the Democrats were in a much stronger position on a regional level than the Whigs had been at the time of their demise, and predicted (correctly, as it turned out) that the Liberal Republicans would not be viable in the long-term due to their lack of distinctive positions compared to the main Republican Party. A sizable minority led by James A. Bayard Jr. sought to act independently of the Liberal Republican ticket, but the bulk of the party agreed to endorse Greeley's candidacy. The convention, which lasted only six hours stretched over two days, is the shortest major political party convention in history.

The Liberal Republican Party fused with the Democratic Party in all states except for Louisiana and Texas. In states where Republicans were stronger, the Liberal Republicans fielded a majority of the joint slate of candidates for lower offices; while in states where Democrats were stronger, the Democrats fielded the most candidates. In many states, such as Ohio, each party nominated half of a joint slate of candidates. Even initially reluctant Democratic leaders like Thomas F. Bayard came to support Greeley.

=== Other nominations ===
Presidential candidates:

| Charles O'Conor | David Davis |
|---|---|
| Former United States Attorney for the Southern District of New York from New York (Declined nomination) | Associate Justice of the United States Supreme Court from Illinois (Nominee – Withdrew on June 24, 1872) |

==== Labor Reform Party ====
The Labor Reform Party had only been organized in 1870 at the National Labor Union Convention, which organized the Labor Reform Party in anticipation of its participation in the 1872 presidential election. In the lead-up to the 1872 presidential election, state-level affiliates of the party formed and saw limited success. One of its major victories was forming a majority coalition with the Democratic Party in the New Hampshire House of Representatives in 1871 in which William Gove, one of its members, was elected Speaker of the House.

The party's first National Convention meeting was held in Columbus, Ohio, on February 21–22, 1872. Initially, there was a fair amount of discussion as to whether the party should actually nominate anyone for the presidency at that time, or if they should wait at least for the Liberal Republicans to nominate their own ticket first. Every motion to that effect lost, and a number of ballots were taken that resulted in the nomination of David Davis for president, who was the frontrunner for the Liberal Republican presidential nomination at that time. Joel Parker, the Governor of New Jersey, was nominated for vice president.

While Davis did not decline the presidential nomination of the Labor Reform party, he decided to hinge his campaign in large part on the success of attaining the Liberal Republican presidential nomination, so that he might at least have their resources behind him. After their convention, in which he failed to attain their presidential nomination, Davis telegraphed the Labor Reform party and informed them of his intention to withdraw from the presidential contest entirely. Joel Parker soon followed suit.

A second convention was called on August 22 in Philadelphia, where it was decided, rather than making the same mistake again, that the party would cooperate with the new Straight-Out Democratic Party that had recently formed. After the election, the various state affiliates grew less and less active, and by the following year, the party ceased to exist. Labor Reform party activity continued to 1878, when the Greenback and Labor Reform parties, with other organizations, formed a National Party.

==== Straight-Out Democratic Party ====
Unwilling to support the Democratic party ticket (Greeley/Brown), a group of mostly Southern Democrats held what they called a Straight-Out Democratic Party convention in Louisville, Kentucky, on August 11, 1872. They nominated as presidential candidate Charles O'Conor, who declined their nomination by telegram; for vice president they nominated John Quincy Adams II. Without time to choose a substitute, the party ran the two candidates anyway. They received 0.36% of the popular votes, and no Electoral College votes.

==== Equal Rights Party ====
Victoria Woodhull is recognized as the first woman to run for president. She was nominated for president by the small Equal Rights Party. Frederick Douglass was nominated for vice president, although he did not attend the convention, acknowledge his nomination, or take an active role in the campaign.

=== Prohibition Party ===
The Prohibition Party held its convention in Columbus, Ohio, on February 22, 1872. It nominated James Black of Pennsylvania for president and John Russell of Michigan for vice president.

== General election ==
=== Campaign ===
Grant's administration and his Radical Republican supporters had been widely accused of corruption, and the Liberal Republicans demanded civil service reform and an end to the Reconstruction process, including withdrawal of federal troops from the South. Both Liberal Republicans and Democrats were disappointed in their candidate Greeley. As wits asked, "Why turn out a knave just to replace him with a fool?" A poor campaigner with little political experience, Greeley's career as a newspaper editor gave his opponents a long history of eccentric public positions to attack. With memories of his victories in the Civil War to run on, Grant was unassailable. Grant also had a large campaign budget to work with. One historian was quoted saying, "Never before was a candidate placed under such great obligation to men of wealth as was Grant." A large portion of Grant's campaign funds came from entrepreneurs, including Jay Cooke, Cornelius Vanderbilt, Alexander Turney Stewart, Henry Hilton, and John Astor.

==== Women's suffrage ====
This was the first election after the formation of the National Woman Suffrage Association and the American Woman Suffrage Association in 1869. As a result, protests for women's suffrage became more prevalent. The National Woman's Suffrage Association held its annual convention in New York City on May 9, 1872. Some of the delegates supported Victoria Woodhull, who had spent the year since the previous NWSA annual meeting touring the New York City environs and giving speeches on why women should be allowed to vote. The delegates selected Victoria Woodhull to run for president, and named Frederick Douglass for vice-president. He did not attend the convention and never acknowledged the nomination, though he served as a presidential elector in the United States Electoral College for the State of New York. Woodhull gave a series of speeches around New York City during the campaign. Her finances were very thin, and when she borrowed money from supporters, she often could not repay them. On the day before the election, Woodhull was arrested for "publishing an obscene newspaper" and thus could not cast a vote for herself. Woodhull was ineligible to be president on Inauguration Day, not because she was a woman (the Constitution and the law were silent on the issue), but because she would not reach the constitutionally prescribed minimum age of 35 until September 23, 1873; historians have debated whether to consider her activities a true election campaign. Woodhull and Douglass are not listed in "Election results" below, as the ticket received a negligible percentage of the popular vote and no electoral votes. In addition, several suffragists attempted to vote in the election. Susan B. Anthony was arrested when she tried to vote and was fined $100 in a widely publicized trial.

=== Results ===
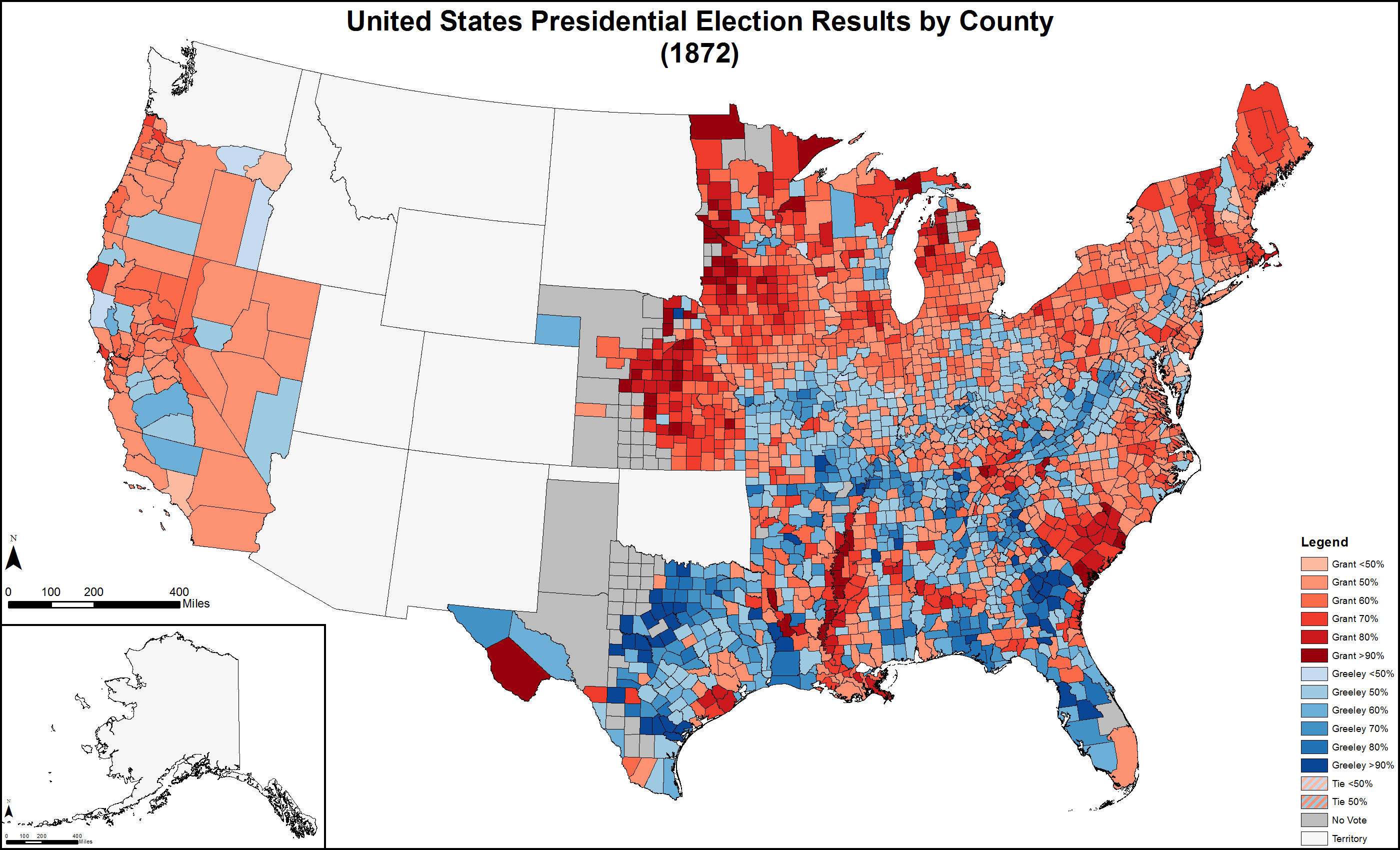
Results by county indicating the percentage of the winning candidate in each county. Shades of red are for Grant (Republican) and shades of blue are for Greeley (Liberal Republican/Democratic).

Illustration from The Story of the Greatest Nations (1913)

32% of the voting age population and 72.1% of eligible voters participated in the election. Grant won an easy re-election over Greeley, with a popular vote margin of 11.8% and 763,000 votes.

Grant also won the electoral college with 286 electoral votes; while Greeley won 66 electoral votes, he died on November 29, 1872, twenty-four days after the election and before any of his pledged electors (from Texas, Missouri, Kentucky, Tennessee, Georgia, and Maryland) could cast their votes. Subsequently, 63 of Greeley's electors cast their votes for other Democrats: 42 voted for non-candidate Indiana Governor-Elect Thomas A. Hendricks, 18 of them cast their presidential votes for Greeley's running mate, Benjamin Gratz Brown, 2 cast their votes for non-candidate and former Georgia Governor Charles J. Jenkins, and 1 cast his vote for non-candidate U.S. Supreme Court Justice David Davis.

Of the 2,171 counties making returns, Grant won in 1,335 while Greeley carried 833. Three counties were split evenly between Grant and Greeley.

=== Disputed votes ===
During the joint session of Congress for the counting of the electoral vote on February 12, 1873, five states had objections that were raised regarding their results. However, unlike the objections which would be made in 1877, these did not affect the outcome of the election.

| State | Electors | Winning candidate | Outcome | Reason for objection | Electors counted |
|---|---|---|---|---|---|
| Arkansas | 6 | Grant | Rejected | Various irregularities, including allegations of electoral fraud | No |
| Louisiana | 8 | Grant | Rejected | Various irregularities, including allegations of electoral fraud | No |
| Georgia | 3 (of 11) | Greeley | Rejected | Ballots were cast for Horace Greeley as president after he had died, and was thus ineligible for the office. | Yes (votes for B. Gratz Brown as vice-president) |
| Mississippi | 8 | Grant | Accepted | Irregularities and concerns regarding the eligibility of elector James J. Spelman | Yes |
| Texas | 8 | Greeley | Accepted | Irregularities | Yes |

This election was the last in which Arkansas voted for a Republican until 1972, and the last in which it voted against the Democrats until 1968. Alabama and Mississippi were not carried by a Republican again until 1964, and they would not vote against the Democrats until 1948. North Carolina and Virginia would not vote Republican again until 1928. West Virginia, Delaware and New Jersey would not vote Republican again until 1896.

=== Table of results ===

Electoral results
| Presidential candidate | Party | Home state | Popular vote | | Electoral vote | Running mate | | |
| Presidential candidate | Party | Home state | Count | Percentage | Electoral vote | Vice-presidential candidate | Home state | Electoral vote |
|---|---|---|---|---|---|---|---|---|
| Ulysses S. Grant (incumbent) | Republican | Illinois | 3,598,235 | 55.6% | 286 | Henry Wilson | Massachusetts | 286 |
| Thomas A. Hendricks | Democratic | Indiana | —^{(a)} | — | 42 | —^{(c)} | | 42 |
| Benjamin Gratz Brown | Liberal Republican/ Democratic | Missouri | —^{(a)} | — | 18 | —^{(c)} | | 18 |
| Horace Greeley | Liberal Republican/ Democratic | New York | 2,834,761 | 43.8% | 3^{(b)} | B. Gratz Brown | Missouri | 3^{(b)} |
| Charles J. Jenkins | Democratic | Georgia | —^{(a)} | — | 2 | —^{(c)} | | 2 |
| David Davis | Liberal Republican | Illinois | —^{(a)} | — | 1 | —^{(c)} | | 1 |
| Charles O'Conor | Straight-Out Democrats | New York | 18,602 | 0.3% | 0 | John Quincy Adams II | Massachusetts | 0 |
| James Black | Prohibition | Pennsylvania | 5,607 | 0.1% | 0 | John Russell | Michigan | 0 |
| Other | | | 10,473 | 0.2% | 0 | | | |
| Total | | | 6,467,678 | 100.0% | 352^{(d)} | | | |
| Needed to win | | | | | 177^{(d)} | | | |

Source (popular vote): Dave Leip's Atlas of U.S. Presidential Elections

Source (electoral vote): "Electoral College Box Scores 1789–1996". National Archives and Records Administration.

^{(a)} These candidates received votes from Electors who were pledged to Horace Greeley, who died before the electoral votes were cast.
^{(b)} Brown's vice-presidential votes were counted, but the presidential votes for Horace Greeley were rejected since he was ineligible for the office of President due to his death.
^{(c)} See Breakdown by ticket below.
^{(d)} The 14 electoral votes from Arkansas and Louisiana were rejected. Had they not been rejected, Grant would have received 300 electoral votes out of a total of 366, well in excess of the 184 required to win, and he would have become the first candidate to receive 300 or more electoral votes.

| Vice presidential candidate | Party | State | Electoral vote |
|---|---|---|---|
| Henry Wilson | Republican | Massachusetts | 286 |
| Benjamin Gratz Brown | Democratic/Liberal Republican | Missouri | 47 |
| Alfred Holt Colquitt | Democratic | Georgia | 5 |
| George Washington Julian | Liberal Republican | Indiana | 5 |
| Thomas Elliott Bramlette | Democratic | Kentucky | 3 |
| John McAuley Palmer | Democratic | Illinois | 3 |
| Nathaniel Prentice Banks | Liberal Republican | Massachusetts | 1 |
| William Slocum Groesbeck | Democratic/Liberal Republican | Ohio | 1 |
| Willis Benson Machen | Democratic | Kentucky | 1 |
| John Quincy Adams II | Straight-Out Democratic | Massachusetts | 0 |
| John Russell | Prohibition | Michigan | 0 |
| Total | | | 352 |
| Needed to win | | | 177 |

Source: "Electoral College Box Scores 1789–1996". National Archives and Records Administration.

Popular vote
| Grant | 55.58% |
| Greeley | 43.78% |
| O'Conor | 0.36% |
| Others | 0.27% |

Electoral vote
| Grant | 81.25% |
| Greeley | 18.75% |

=== Geography of results ===
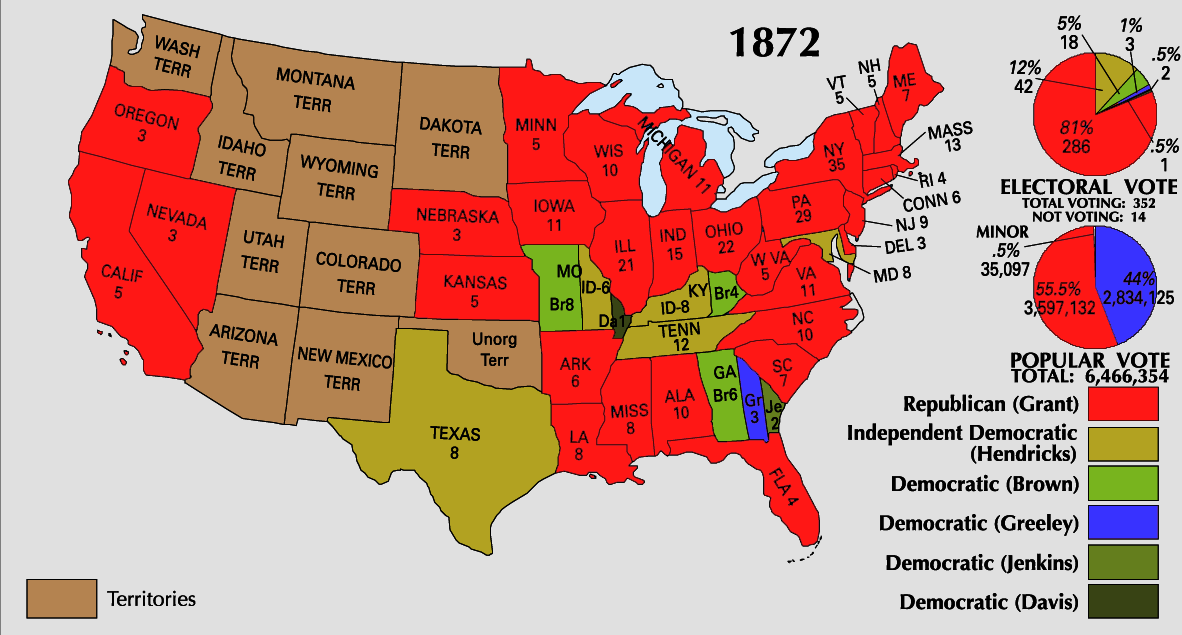

Results by county, shaded according to winning candidate's percentage of the vote

Pledged electors by state.

==== Cartographic gallery ====
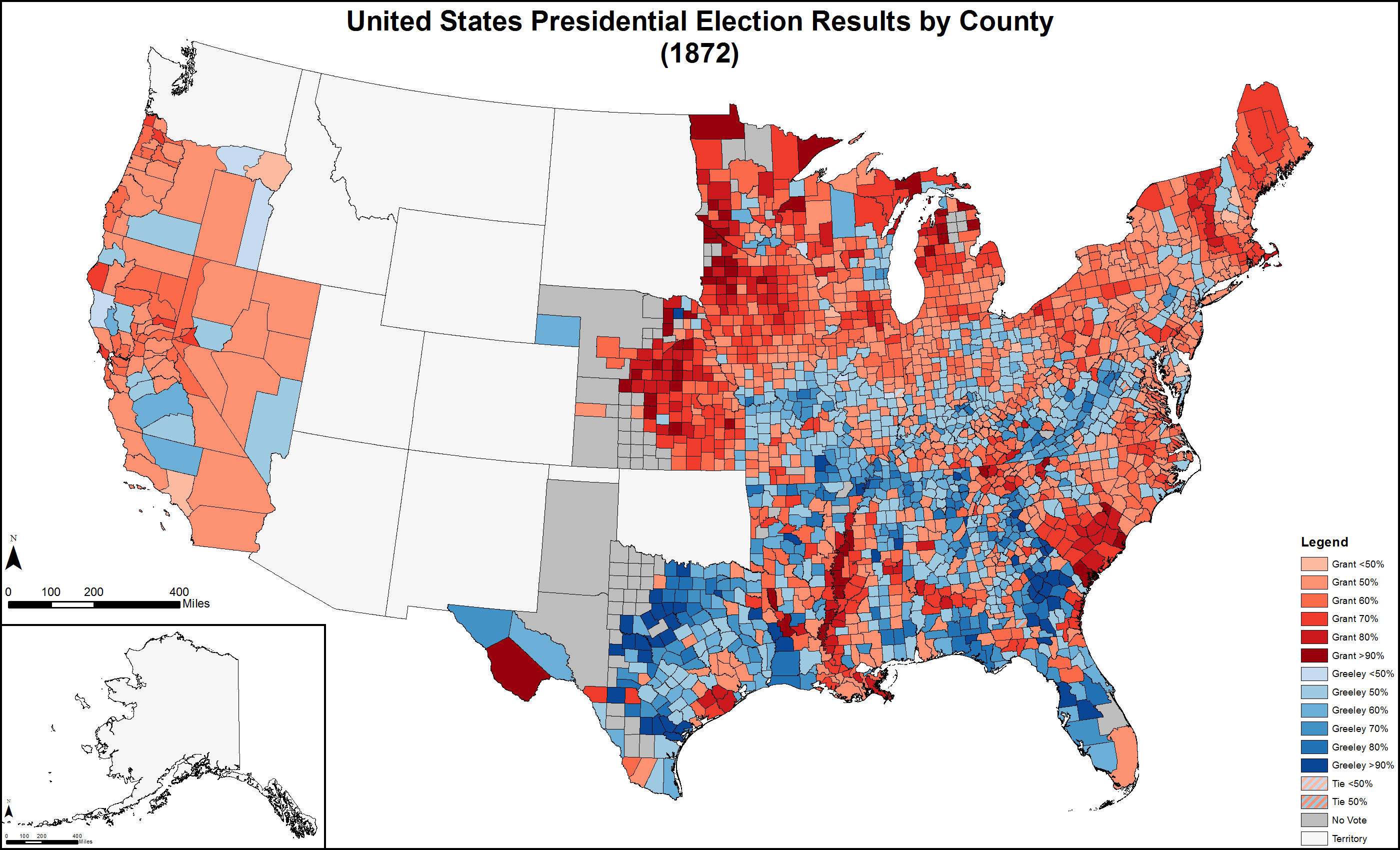
Map of presidential election results by county

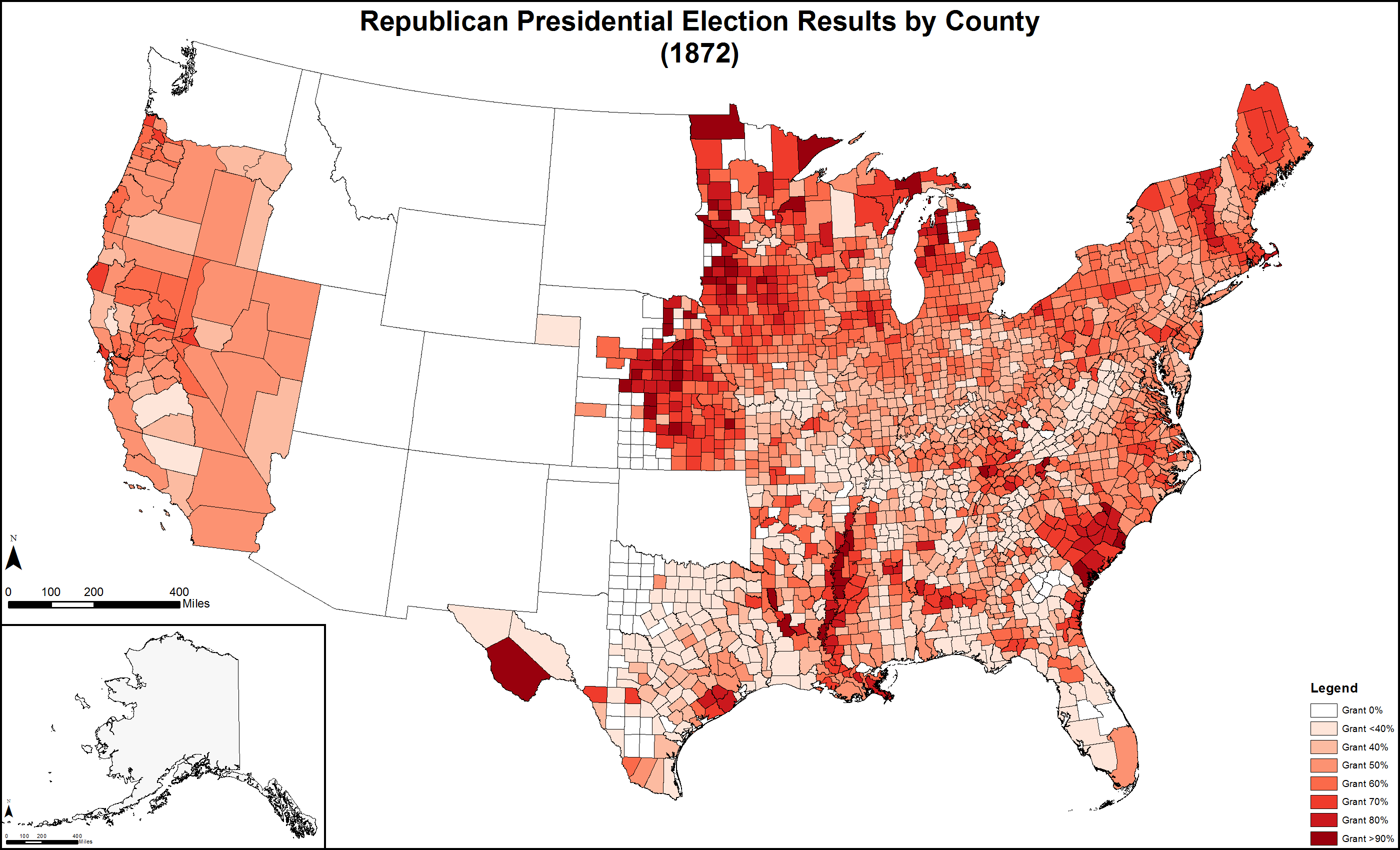
Map of Republican presidential election results by county

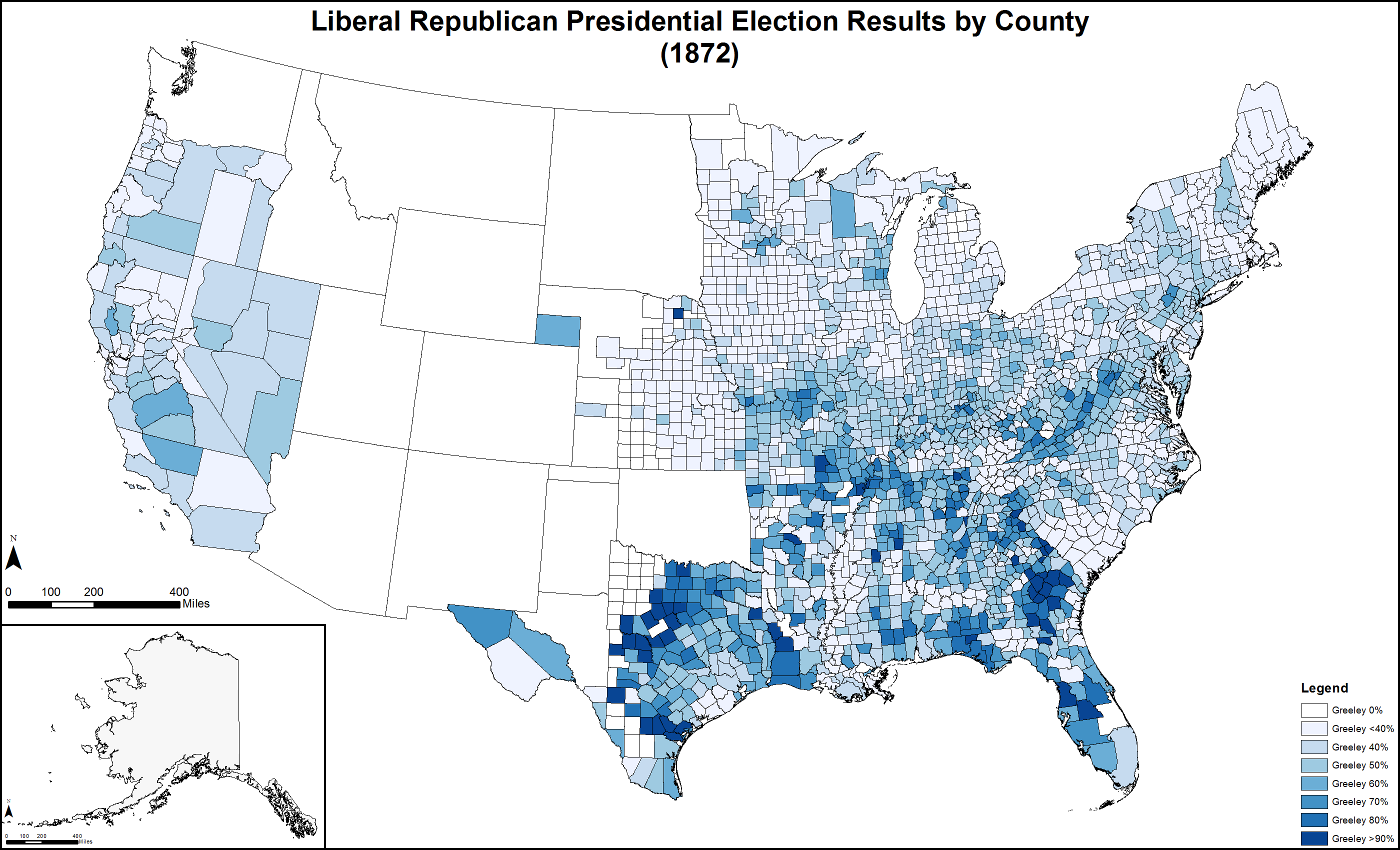
Map of Liberal Republican/Democratic presidential election results by county

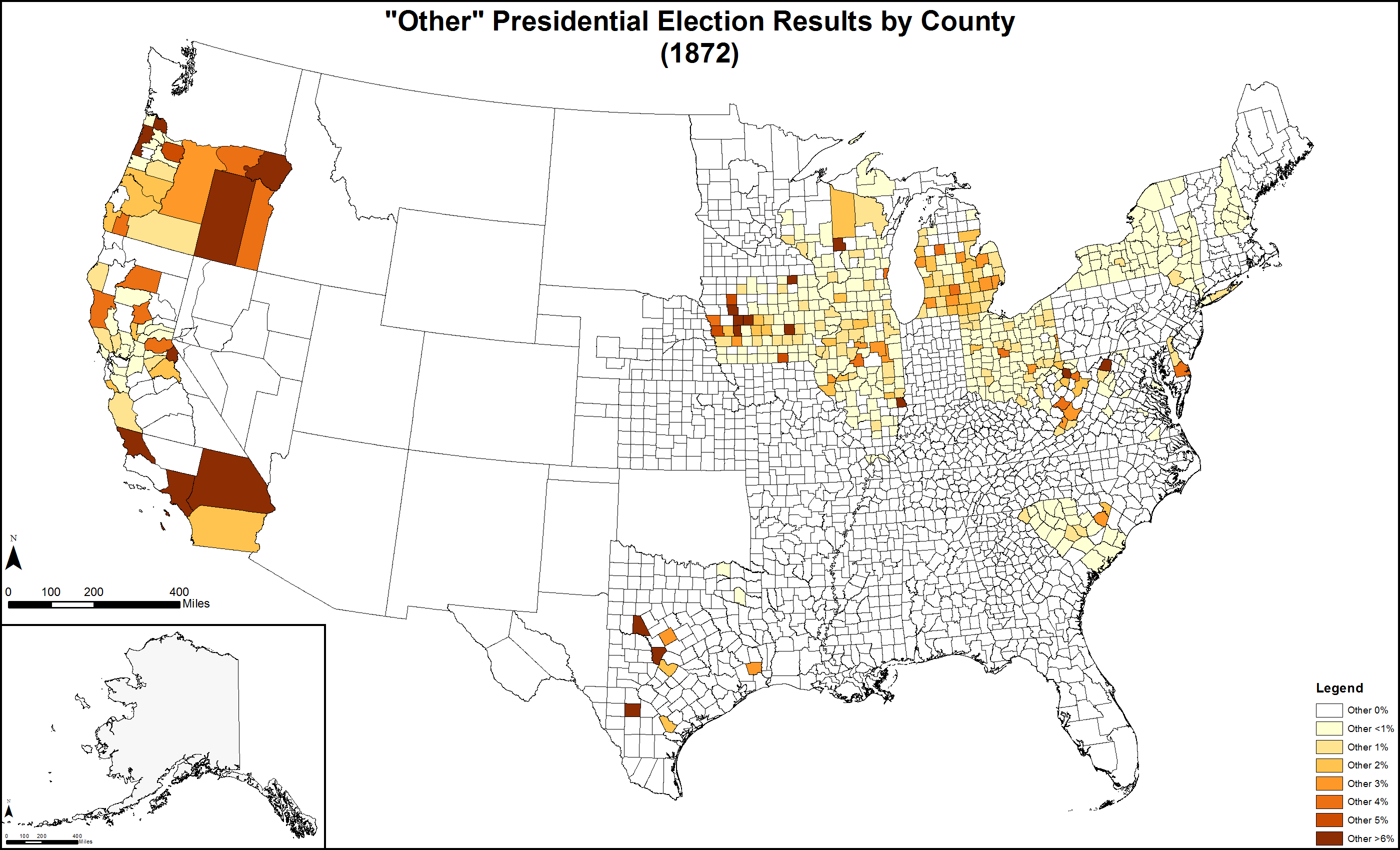
Map of "other" presidential election results by county

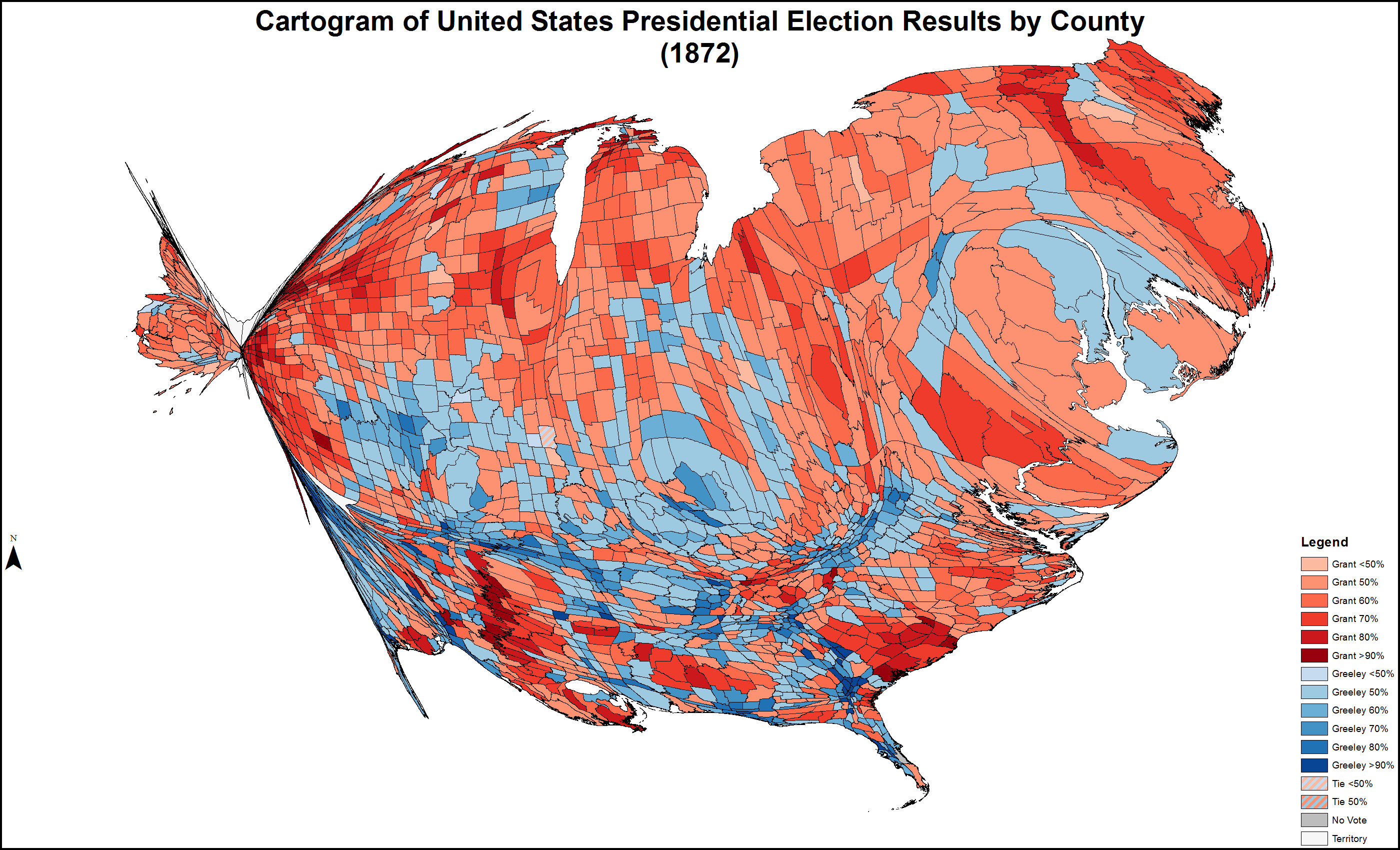
Cartogram of presidential election results by county

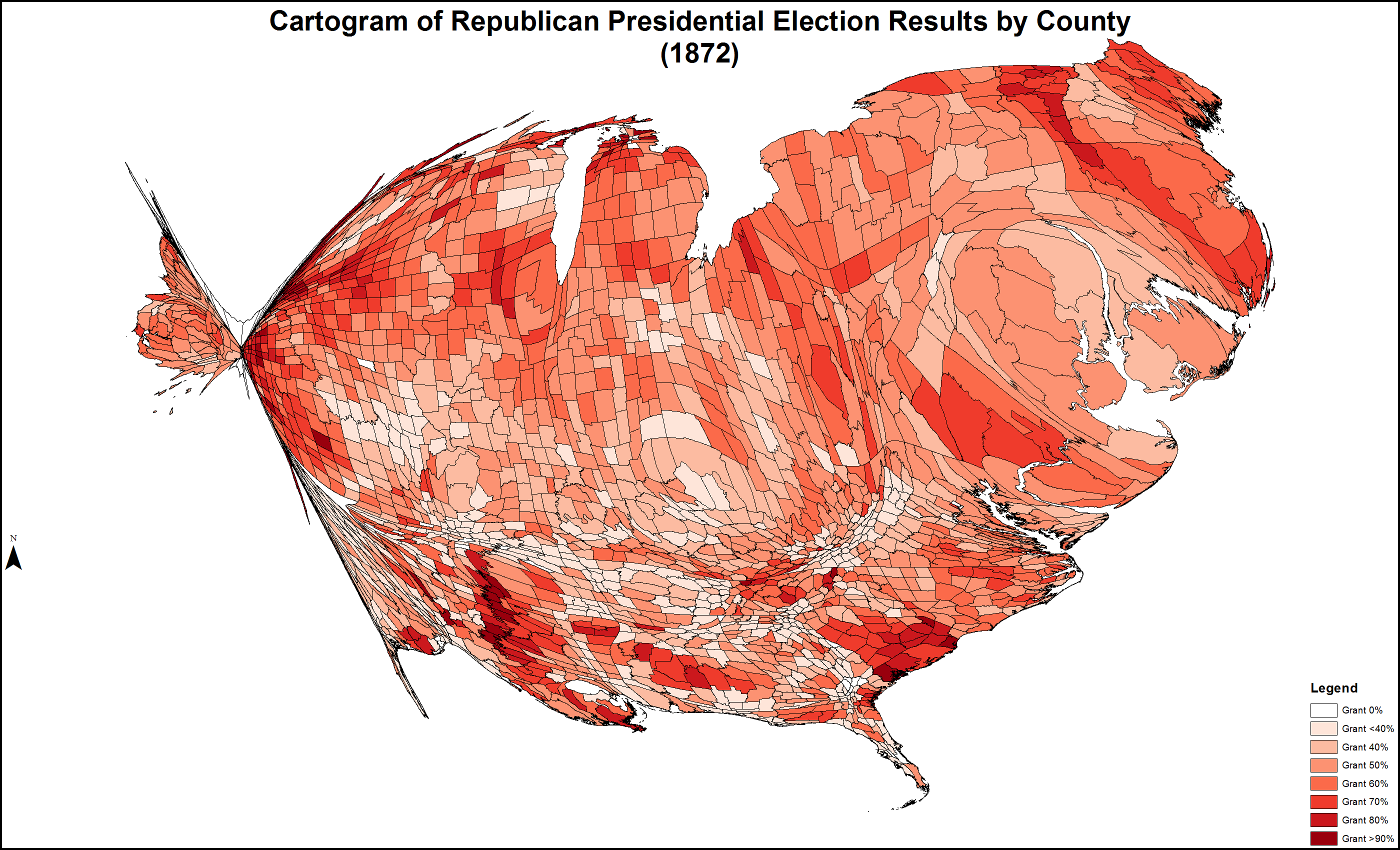
Cartogram of Republican presidential election results by county

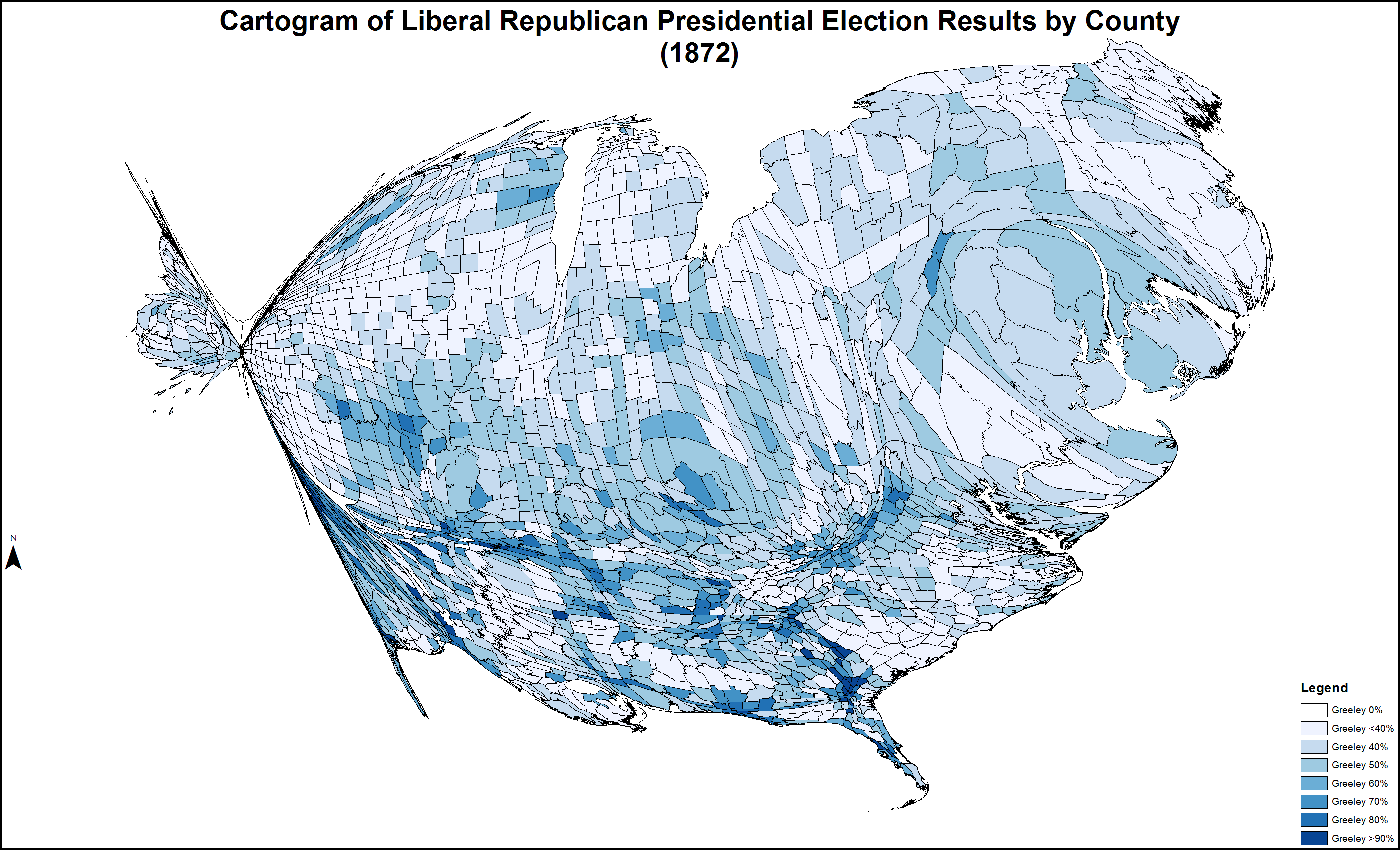
Cartogram of Liberal Republican/Democratic presidential election results by county

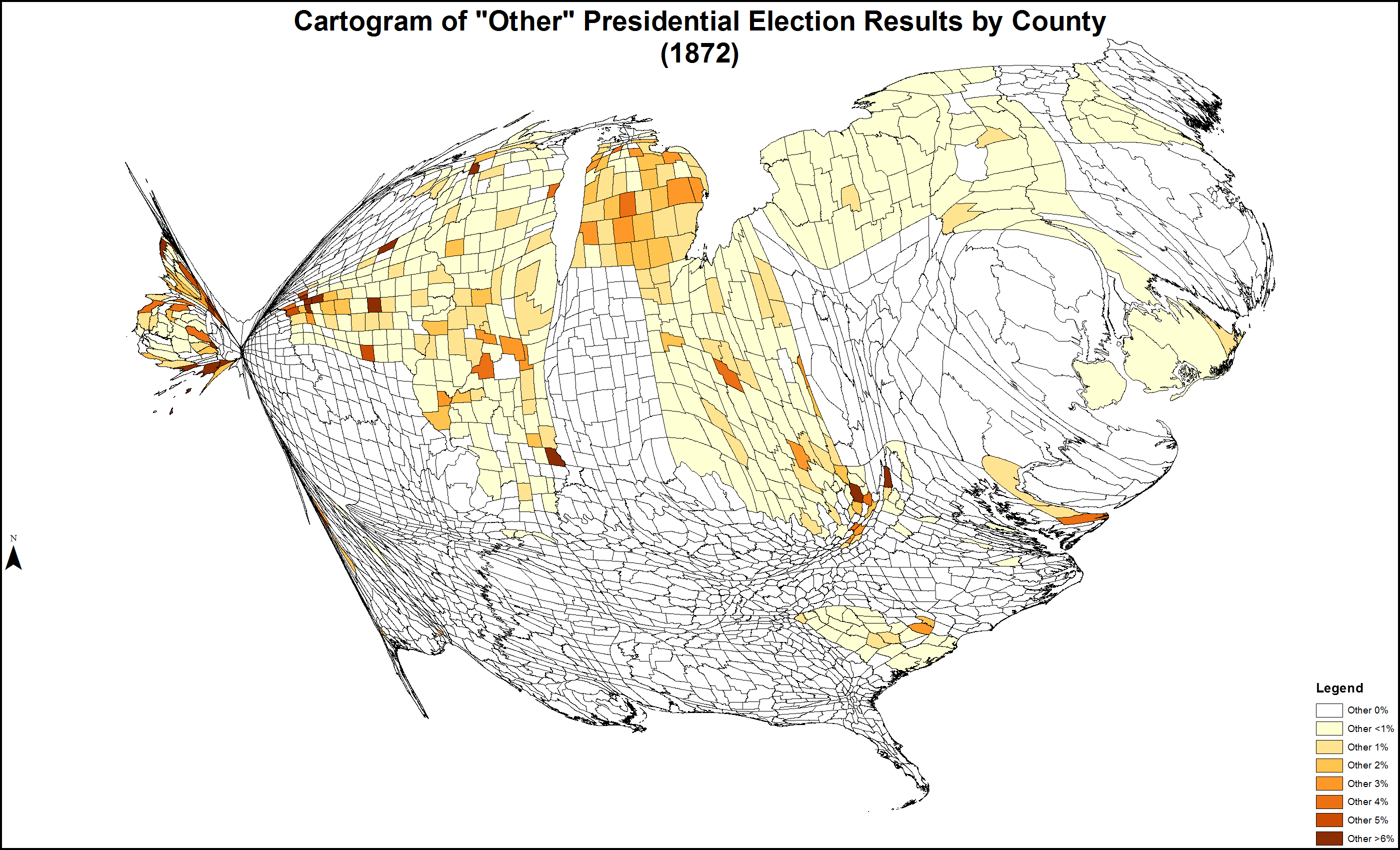
Cartogram of "other" presidential election results by county

=== Results by state ===
Source: Data from Walter Dean Burnham, Presidential ballots, 1836–1892 (Johns Hopkins University Press, 1955) pp 247–57.

States/districts won by Greeley/Brown
States/districts won by Grant/Wilson

| | | Ulysses S. Grant Republican | | | Horace Greeley Democratic/Liberal Republican | | | Charles O'Conor Straight-Out Democrat | | | Margin | | State Total | |
| State | electoral votes | # | % | electoral votes | # | % | electoral votes | # | % | electoral votes | # | % | # | |
|---|---|---|---|---|---|---|---|---|---|---|---|---|---|---|
| Alabama | 10 | 90,272 | 53.19 | 10 | 79,444 | 46.81 | - | - | - | - | 10,828 | 6.38 | 169,716 | AL |
| Arkansas | 6 | 41,373 | 52.17 | 0 | 37,927 | 47.83 | - | - | - | - | 3,446 | 4.35 | 79,300 | AR |
| California | 6 | 51,181 | 56.00 | 6 | 39,060 | 42.74 | - | 920 | 1.01 | - | 12,121 | 13.26 | 91,387 | CA |
| Connecticut | 6 | 50,314 | 52.41 | 6 | 45,695 | 47.59 | - | - | - | - | 4,619 | 4.81 | 96,009 | CT |
| Delaware | 3 | 11,129 | 51.00 | 3 | 10,205 | 46.76 | - | 488 | 2.24 | - | 924 | 4.23 | 21,822 | DE |
| Florida | 4 | 17,763 | 53.52 | 4 | 15,427 | 46.48 | - | - | - | - | 2,336 | 7.04 | 33,190 | FL |
| Georgia | 11 | 62,550 | 45.03 | - | 76,356 | 54.97 | 11 | - | - | - | -13,806 | -9.94 | 138,906 | GA |
| Illinois | 21 | 241,936 | 56.27 | 21 | 184,884 | 43.00 | - | 3,151 | 0.73 | - | 57,052 | 13.27 | 429,971 | IL |
| Indiana | 15 | 186,147 | 53.00 | 15 | 163,632 | 46.59 | - | 1,417 | 0.40 | - | 22,515 | 6.41 | 351,196 | IN |
| Iowa | 11 | 131,566 | 60.81 | 11 | 81,636 | 37.73 | - | 2,221 | 1.03 | - | 49,930 | 23.08 | 216,365 | IA |
| Kansas | 5 | 66,805 | 66.46 | 5 | 32,970 | 32.80 | - | 156 | 0.16 | - | 33,835 | 33.66 | 100,512 | KS |
| Kentucky | 12 | 88,766 | 46.44 | - | 99,995 | 52.32 | 12 | 2,374 | 1.24 | - | -11,229 | -5.87 | 191,135 | KY |
| Louisiana | 8 | 71,663 | 55.69 | 0 | 57,029 | 44.31 | - | - | - | - | 14,634 | 11.37 | 128,692 | LA |
| Maine | 7 | 61,426 | 67.86 | 7 | 29,097 | 32.14 | - | - | - | - | 32,329 | 35.71 | 90,523 | ME |
| Maryland | 8 | 66,760 | 49.66 | - | 67,687 | 50.34 | 8 | - | - | - | -927 | -0.69 | 134,447 | MD |
| Massachusetts | 13 | 133,455 | 69.20 | 13 | 59,195 | 30.69 | - | - | - | - | 74,260 | 38.50 | 192,864 | MA |
| Michigan | 11 | 138,758 | 62.66 | 11 | 78,551 | 35.47 | - | 2,875 | 1.30 | - | 60,207 | 27.19 | 221,455 | MI |
| Minnesota | 5 | 55,708 | 61.27 | 5 | 35,211 | 38.73 | - | - | - | - | 20,497 | 22.54 | 90,919 | MN |
| Mississippi | 8 | 82,175 | 63.48 | 8 | 47,282 | 36.52 | - | - | - | - | 34,893 | 26.95 | 129,457 | MS |
| Missouri | 15 | 119,196 | 43.65 | - | 151,434 | 55.46 | 15 | 2,429 | 0.89 | - | -32,238 | -11.81 | 273,059 | MO |
| Nebraska | 3 | 18,329 | 70.68 | 3 | 7,603 | 29.32 | - | - | - | - | 10,726 | 41.36 | 25,932 | NE |
| Nevada | 3 | 8,413 | 57.43 | 3 | 6,236 | 42.57 | - | - | - | - | 2,177 | 14.86 | 14,649 | NV |
| New Hampshire | 5 | 37,168 | 53.94 | 5 | 31,425 | 45.61 | - | - | - | - | 5,743 | 8.33 | 68,906 | NH |
| New Jersey | 9 | 91,656 | 54.52 | 9 | 76,456 | 45.48 | - | - | - | - | 15,200 | 9.04 | 168,112 | NJ |
| New York | 35 | 440,738 | 53.23 | 35 | 387,282 | 46.77 | - | - | - | - | 53,456 | 6.46 | 828,020 | NY |
| North Carolina | 10 | 94,772 | 57.38 | 10 | 70,130 | 42.46 | - | 261 | 0.16 | - | 24,642 | 14.92 | 165,163 | NC |
| Ohio | 22 | 281,852 | 53.24 | 22 | 244,321 | 46.15 | - | 1,163 | 0.22 | - | 37,531 | 7.09 | 529,436 | OH |
| Oregon | 3 | 11,818 | 58.66 | 3 | 7,742 | 38.43 | - | 587 | 2.91 | - | 4,076 | 20.23 | 20,147 | OR |
| Pennsylvania | 29 | 349,589 | 62.07 | 29 | 212,041 | 37.65 | - | - | - | - | 137,548 | 24.42 | 563,262 | PA |
| Rhode Island | 4 | 13,665 | 71.94 | 4 | 5,329 | 28.06 | - | - | - | - | 8,336 | 43.89 | 18,994 | RI |
| South Carolina | 7 | 72,290 | 75.73 | 7 | 22,699 | 23.78 | - | 204 | 0.21 | - | 49,591 | 51.95 | 95,452 | SC |
| Tennessee | 12 | 85,655 | 47.84 | - | 93,391 | 52.16 | 12 | - | - | - | -7,736 | -4.32 | 179,046 | TN |
| Texas | 8 | 47,468 | 40.71 | - | 66,546 | 57.07 | 8 | 2,580 | 2.21 | - | -19,078 | -16.36 | 116,594 | TX |
| Vermont | 5 | 41,480 | 78.29 | 5 | 10,926 | 20.62 | - | 553 | 1.04 | - | 30,554 | 57.67 | 52,980 | VT |
| Virginia | 11 | 93,463 | 50.47 | 11 | 91,647 | 49.49 | - | 85 | 0.05 | - | 1,816 | 0.98 | 185,195 | VA |
| West Virginia | 5 | 32,320 | 51.74 | 5 | 29,532 | 47.28 | - | 615 | 0.98 | - | 2,788 | 4.46 | 62,467 | WV |
| Wisconsin | 10 | 104,994 | 54.60 | 10 | 86,477 | 44.97 | - | 834 | 0.43 | - | 18,517 | 9.16 | 192,305 | WI |
| TOTALS: | 366 | 3,597,439 | 55.58 | 286 | 2,833,710 | 43.78 | 66 | 23,054 | 0.36 | - | 763,729 | 11.80 | 6,471,983 | US |

=== States that flipped from Democratic to Republican ===
- Delaware
- Louisiana
- New Jersey
- New York
- Oregon

=== States that flipped from Republican to Democratic ===
- Missouri
- Tennessee

=== Close states ===
Red font color denotes states won by Republican Ulysses S. Grant; pink denotes those won by Democrat/Liberal Republican Horace Greeley.

States where the margin of victory was under 1% (19 electoral votes)

1. Maryland 0.69% (927 votes)
2. Virginia 0.98% (1,816 votes)

Margin of victory between 1% and 5% (32 electoral votes)

1. Delaware 4.23% (924 votes)
2. Tennessee 4.32% (7,736 votes)
3. Arkansas 4.35% (3,446 votes)
4. West Virginia 4.46% (2,788 votes)
5. Connecticut 4.81% (4,619 votes)

Margin of victory between 5% and 10% (133 electoral votes):

1. Kentucky 5.87% (11,229 votes)
2. Alabama 6.38% (10,828 votes)
3. Indiana 6.41% (22,515 votes)
4. New York 6.46% (53,456 votes)
5. Florida 7.04% (2,336 votes)
6. Ohio 7.09% (37,531 votes) (tipping point state with rejection of electors in Arkansas and Louisiana)
7. New Hampshire 8.33% (5,743 votes) (tipping point state if electors of Arkansas and Louisiana were not rejected)
8. New Jersey 9.04% (15,200 votes)
9. Wisconsin 9.16% (18,517 votes)
10. Georgia 9.94% (13,806 votes)

=== Breakdown by ticket ===
| Presidential candidate | Running mate | Electoral vote^{(a)} |
|---|---|---|
| Ulysses S. Grant | Henry Wilson | 286 |
| Thomas Andrews Hendricks | Benjamin Gratz Brown | 41 .. 42 |
| Benjamin Gratz Brown | Alfred Holt Colquitt | 5 |
| Benjamin Gratz Brown | George Washington Julian | 4 .. 5 |
| Benjamin Gratz Brown | Thomas E. Bramlette | 3 |
| Horace Greeley | Benjamin Gratz Brown | 3 ^{(b)} |
| Benjamin Gratz Brown | John McAuley Palmer | 2 .. 3 |
| Charles J. Jenkins | Benjamin Gratz Brown | 2 |
| Benjamin Gratz Brown | Nathaniel Prentiss Banks | 1 |
| Benjamin Gratz Brown | Willis Benson Machen | 1 |
| Benjamin Gratz Brown | William Slocum Groesbeck | 0 .. 1 |
| David Davis | Benjamin Gratz Brown | 0 .. 1 |
| David Davis | William Slocum Groesbeck | 0 .. 1 |
| David Davis | George Washington Julian | 0 .. 1 |
| David Davis | John McAuley Palmer | 0 .. 1 |
| Thomas Andrews Hendricks | William Slocum Groesbeck | 0 .. 1 |
| Thomas Andrews Hendricks | George Washington Julian | 0 .. 1 |
| Thomas Andrews Hendricks | John McAuley Palmer | 0 .. 1 |

^{(a)} The used sources had insufficient data to determine the pairings of 4 electoral votes in Missouri; therefore, the possible tickets are listed with the minimum and maximum possible number of electoral votes each.
^{(b)} Brown's vice-presidential votes were counted, but the presidential votes for Horace Greeley were rejected since he was ineligible for the office of President due to his death.

== Demise of the Liberal Republicans ==
Though the national party organization disappeared after 1872, several Liberal Republican members continued to serve in Congress after the 1872 elections. Most Liberal Republican Congressmen eventually joined the Democratic Party. Outside of the South, some Liberal Republicans sought the creation of a new party opposed to Republicans, but Democrats were unwilling to abandon their old party affiliation and even relatively successful efforts like Wisconsin's Reform Party collapsed. The especially strong Missouri Liberal Republican Party collapsed as the Democrats re-established themselves as the major opposition party to the Republicans. In the following years, former Liberal Republicans became members in good standing of both major parties.

== See also ==
- 1872–73 United States Senate elections
- 1872–73 United States House of Representatives elections
- American election campaigns in the 19th century
- History of the United States (1865–1918)
- Presidency of Ulysses S. Grant
- Reconstruction era
- Second inauguration of Ulysses S. Grant
- Third Party System

== Works cited ==
- Abramson, Paul; Aldrich, John; Rohde, David (1995). Change and Continuity in the 1992 Elections. CQ Press. ISBN 0871878399.
