= Horace Greeley 1872 presidential campaign =

American political campaign

Horace Greeley for President
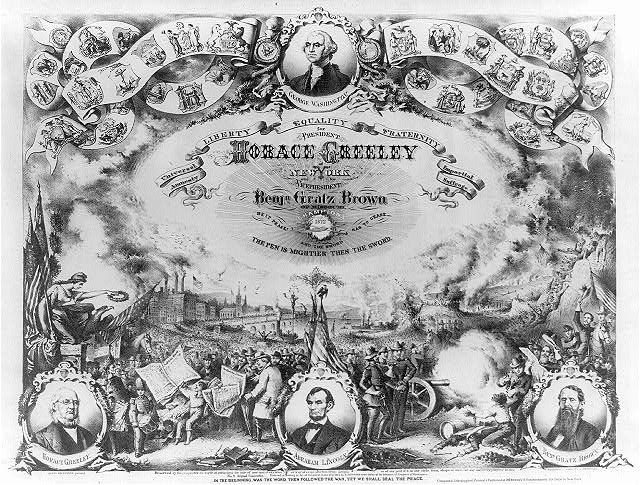
- Campaign: U.S. presidential election, 1872
- Candidate: Horace Greeley; U.S. Representative for New York's 1st district (1848–1849); Benjamin Gratz Brown; 20th Governor of Missouri (1871-1873)
- Affiliation: Liberal Republican
- Status: Lost general election: November 5, 1872
- Slogan(s): Turn the Rascals Out; Universal amnesty, impartial suffrage

In 1872, Horace Greeley ran unsuccessfully for President of the United States. He served as the candidate of both the Democrats and the Liberal Republicans (a breakaway party that split off from the Republican Party due to its members' dislike of the corruption of the Republicans and the Republicans' Reconstruction policies), in the 1872 election. In the run-up to the 1872 United States presidential election, major changes occurred in the United States. Specifically, the 15th Amendment gave African Americans the right to vote for the first time, while the government cracked down on the Ku Klux Klan. In addition, the economy was still in good shape and President Ulysses S. Grant's corruption scandals for the most part was still not public knowledge. With this background, the incumbent U.S. President was able to decisively defeat Greeley.

== The Liberal Republican nomination fight ==
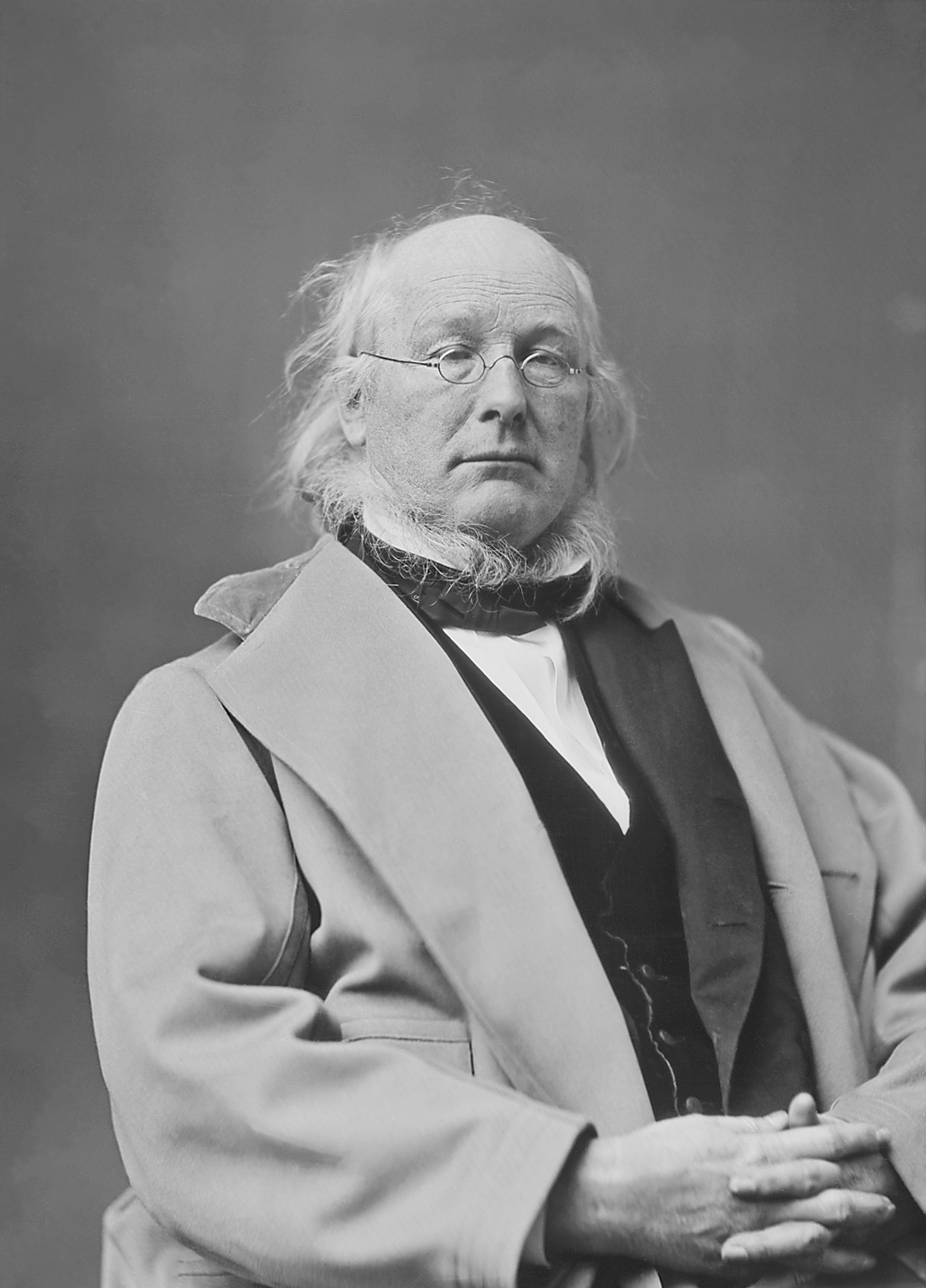
A portrait of Horace Greeley in the 1860s

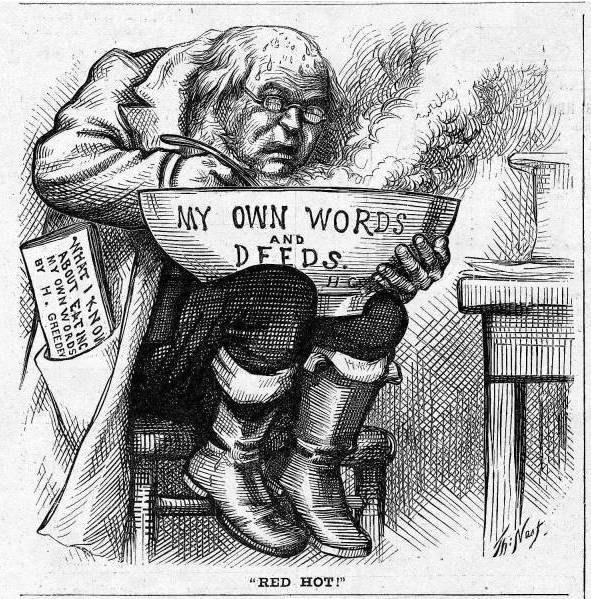
Thomas Nast cartoon for the 1872 campaign alleging that Greeley was contradicting his earlier positions.

The fight for the presidential nomination of the Liberal Republican Party was heavily contested in 1872. While U.S. Supreme Court Justice David Davis was the initial front-runner for the Liberal Republican nomination, his support weakened after he was relentlessly criticized and attacked in various newspapers. Thus, former United States Minister to the United Kingdom (and son of U.S. President John Quincy Adams) Charles Francis Adams, Sr. was able to open a lead at the 1872 Liberal Republican National Convention with 205 delegates. After Missouri Governor Benjamin Gratz Brown, another 1872 Liberal Republican candidate, dropped out of the race and endorsed New York Tribune editor and former Congressman Horace Greeley, Greeley was able to overtake Adams on the second ballot, with Greeley getting 245 delegates to Adams's 243. After a surge by U.S. Senator Lyman Trumbull on the third ballot, Greeley was able to retake the lead with 334 delegates on the sixth ballot. Later on, Greeley ended up winning the 1872 Liberal Republican nomination with 482 delegates to Adams's 187. Meanwhile, Gratz Brown was chosen by the delegates at this convention as Greeley's running mate.

The Greeley nomination was extremely surprising to U.S. Senator Carl Schurz, a prominent Liberal Republican, as well as to the other supporters of Charles Francis Adams. Both the press and the public were also surprised by the Greeley nomination because the largely pro-free trade Liberal Republicans had chosen a staunch protectionist as their presidential nominee. Moreover, Greeley had no political or government experience, was known for his eccentric, erratic persona and support of a wide variety of fringe ideas from vegetarianism to spiritualism, and had left a massive paper trail of controversial and sometimes contradictory public statements which the press and his political enemies could exploit. After Greeley and Gratz Brown were nominated by the Liberal Republicans, the Democrats also nominated the Greeley-Brown ticket as its own nominees for the 1872 U.S. presidential election due to their belief that they could not win the U.S. presidency without the support of anti-Grant Liberal Republicans. Both Liberal Republicans and Democrats thought that, by sharing the same presidential candidate, they would be able to infiltrate and dominate the other party.

A group of Democrats dissatisfied with the Greeley nomination called themselves the Straight-Out Democratic Party and held a second nominating convention in Louisville, Kentucky. They nominated Charles O'Conor and John Quincy Adams II as candidates, although both disavowed the breakaway party. Electors pledged to O'Conor and Adams received 0.35% of the popular vote, and none were elected to the Electoral College.

== Campaign ==
The 1872 U.S. presidential campaign was filled with dirty attacks and mudslinging on both sides, with Greeley partisans calling Grant a dictator and a drunk, while Grant partisans called Greeley a traitor and a flake. In addition, Grant and the Republicans "waved the bloody shirt" by associating the Democrats with secession and with the defeated Confederacy. During the campaign, federal officials arrested over 1,000 people under authority of the Reconstruction Enforcement Acts in order to make sure that Republicans, especially Blacks, were not prevented from voting.

While President Grant did not actively campaign, Greeley travelled through New Jersey, Pennsylvania, Ohio, Kentucky, and Indiana and delivering up to 22 speeches per day for a total of nearly 200. Ultimately, though, Greeley was hurt by the belief that he was saying the wrong things to the wrong audiences during his campaign, and by taking political attacks extremely personally. He also suffered a personal loss during the campaign when his wife fell ill and died in October 1872.

To make matters worse, his running mate, Gratz Brown, was an embarrassment who attended campaign events and delivered speeches while intoxicated (he fainted before a gathering in New York City, and at a campaign picnic, Brown was so drunk he was seen slicing up and buttering a watermelon), forgot party policies, and generally made errors and misstatements.

== Results ==
Grant defeated Greeley in the election by a landslide, winning 31 out of 37 states in capturing the Electoral College by 286 to 66, and won the national popular vote by 55.6% to 43.8%. Grant's winning percentage was the highest between 1828 and 1904, while Greeley's losing percentage was the lowest between 1848 and 1904. However, Grant's performance was much weaker in the South, where his (and the Republicans') appeal was primarily limited to Black men.

Due to exhaustion and demoralization, Horace Greeley himself died several weeks after the 1872 election, before the Electoral College met.
