= 1872 United States presidential election in Arkansas =

- November 5, 1872
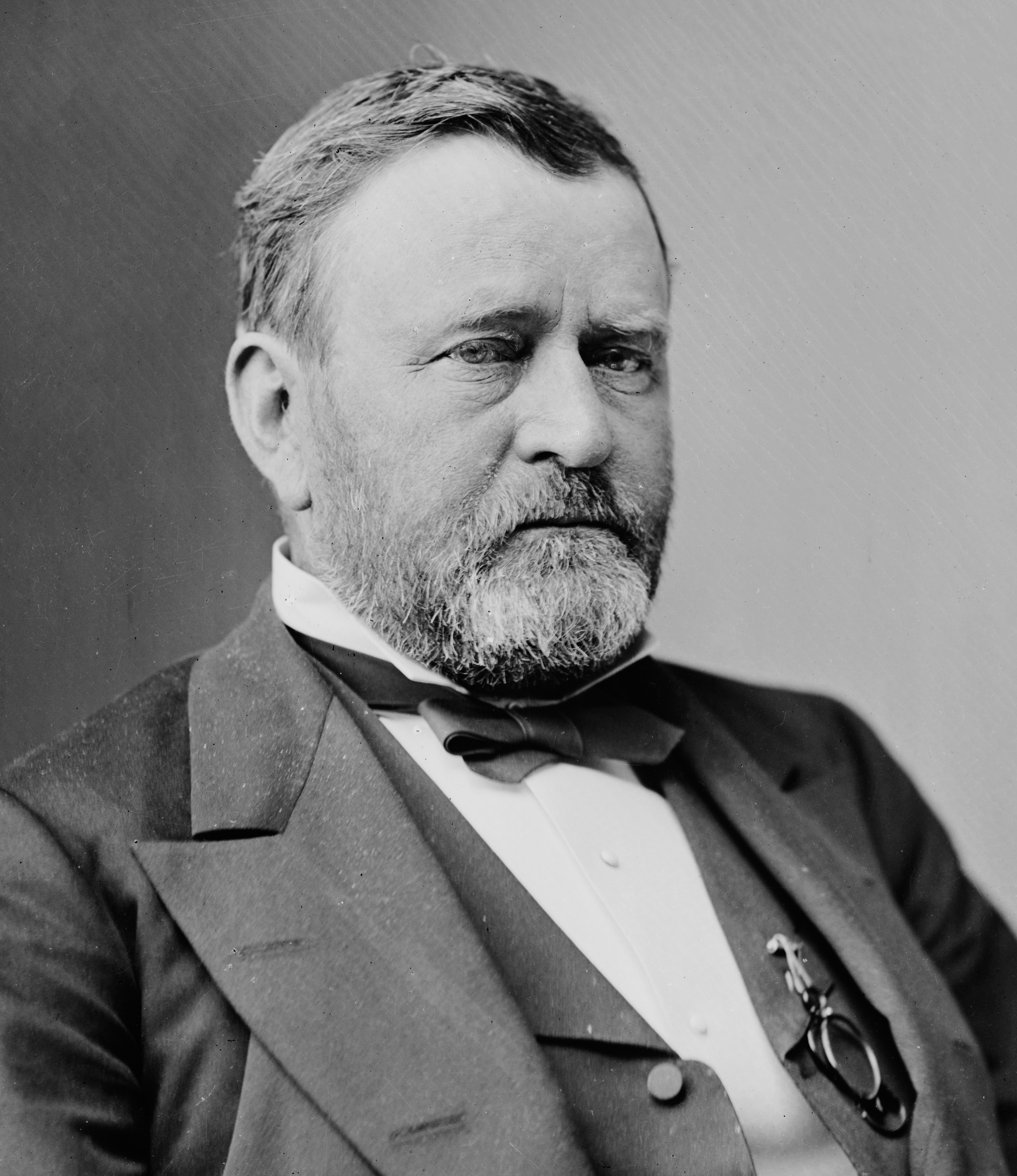

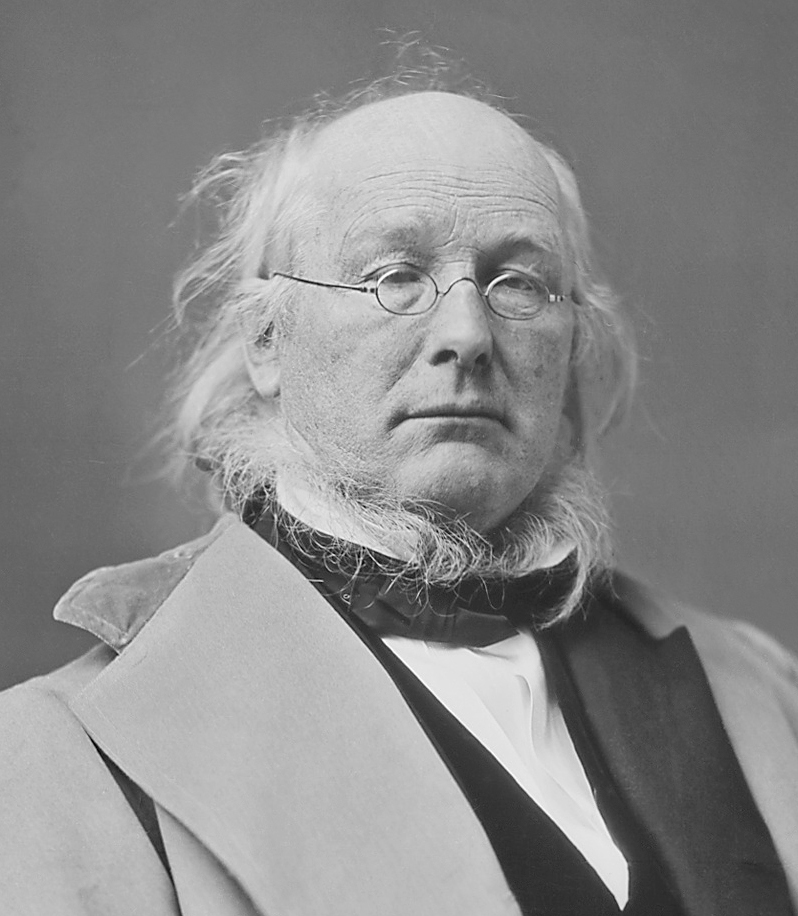
Nominee	Ulysses S. Grant	Horace Greeley
Party	Republican	Liberal Republican
Home state	Illinois	New York
Running mate	Henry Wilson	Benjamin G. Brown
Electoral vote	none (6 elected)	0
Popular vote	41,373	37,927
Percentage	52.17%	47.83%
County results
Grant
50–60%
60–70%
70–80%
80–90%
Greeley
50–60%
60–70%
70–80%
80–90%
90–100%
President before election
Ulysses S. Grant
Republican
Elected President
Ulysses S. Grant
Republican

The 1872 United States presidential election in Arkansas took place on November 5, 1872, as part of the 1872 United States presidential election. Voters chose six representatives, or electors to the Electoral College, who voted for president and vice president.

Arkansas voted for the Republican candidate, President Ulysses S. Grant, over Liberal Republican candidate Horace Greeley. Grant won Arkansas by a margin of 4.34%. However, due to the turbulent conditions of Reconstruction, along with various irregularities and allegations of electoral fraud, Congress rejected Arkansas' six electoral votes. Neighboring Louisiana's electoral votes were also rejected. This would be the last time a Republican presidential candidate won Arkansas until Richard Nixon carried the state in 1972

== Results ==
1872 United States presidential election in Arkansas
Party	Candidate	Running mate	Popular vote		Electoral vote	
Party	Candidate	Running mate	Count	%	Count	%
Republican	Ulysses S. Grant of Illinois (incumbent)	Henry Wilson of Massachusetts	41,373	52.17%	0 (6 elected)	0.00%
Liberal Republican	Horace Greeley of New York	Benjamin Gratz Brown of Missouri	37,927	47.83%	0	0.00%
Total			79,300	100.00%	0	0.00%

== See also ==
- United States presidential elections in Arkansas
