= James Ballantine (politician) =

American politician

James Ballantine (January 27, 1855 Andes, Delaware County, New York – May 4, 1896 Andes, Delaware Co., NY) was an American politician from New York.

== Life ==
He was a merchant, dealing in butter and general merchandise.

He was a trustee of the Village of Andes in 1876 and 1877; Supervisor of the Town of Andes from 1881 to 1889; a member of the New York State Assembly (Delaware Co.) in 1890; and a member of the New York State Senate (26th D.) in 1896.

He died a few days after the end of the session, on May 4, 1896, at his home in Andes, after he "was seized with a paralytic fit", and was buried at the Andes Rural Cemetery.

== Sources ==
- The New York Red Book compiled by Edgar L. Murlin (published by James B. Lyon, Albany NY, 1897; pg. 507)
- SENATOR JAMES BALLANTINE DEAD in NYT on May 5, 1896
- Andes Rural Cemetery transcriptions

New York State Assembly
Preceded by George O. Mead	New York State Assembly; Delaware County; 1890	Succeeded by Henry Davie
New York State Senate
Preceded by John Raines	New York State Senate; 26th District; 1896	Succeeded by John Grant
