= 1866 West Virginia Constitutional amendment referendum =

West Virginia ballot measure

- May 24, 1866
- An amendment to the constitution of this State, which provided that no person who, subsequent to June, 1861, had given voluntary aid to the late Southern Confederacy, should be a citizen of the State, or permitted to vote at any election therein.

Results
Choice	Votes	%
Ratification	23,337	59.15%
Rejection	16,120	40.85%
Total votes	39,457	100.00%
Ratification
90–100%
80–90%
70–80%
60–70%
50–60%
Rejection
90–100%
80–90%
70–80%
60–70%
50–60%

A referrendum was held in West Virginia on May 24, 1866 to add an amendment to the Constitution of West Virginia. Voters were asked whether to restrict suffrage to former Confederate supporters. The amendment was approved and disenfranchised many voters. The amendment was overturned by the Flick Amendment in 1871 to restore the rights of the former Confederates.

== History ==
After the American Civil War, which led to the creation of West Virginia splitting from Virginia, there was a lot of resentment from West Virginians against the former Confederacy. Former Confederates started to engage in politics in West Virginia. Previously, the West Virginia Legislature, which was dominated by Radical Republicans, also enacted the Voters' Test Oaths of 1865 and the Voters' Registration Law of 1866. These measures restricted the right to vote and required state and local officials, as well as attorneys and school teachers, to take oaths of allegiance to West Virginia and the United States. It also preemptively all but ensured the passage of the amendment. The referendum was proposed by Republicans in order to strip voting rights from anyone whom had supported the Confederacy after 1861 and would refuse to recognise their American citizenship.

The referendum question passed, with 59% voting for the amendment. This resulted in significant voter suppression, especially in the southern sections of the state. Estimates of the number of disfranchised voters are around 20,000.

However in 1871, Liberal Republicans joined together with Democrats to pass the Flick Amendment to the state constitution, which ended political restrictions on ex-Confederates in West Virginia. On April 27, voters approved the amendment by a margin of more than three to one, or 23,546 to 6,323. At the time, it was believed that about 15,000 people in West Virginia recovered the right to vote after the amendment was passed.
