= 1871 West Virginia Constitutional amendment referendum =

West Virginia ballot measure

- April 17, 1871
- That the male citizens of the State shall be entitled to vote at all elections held within the election districts in which they respectively reside; but no person who is a minor, or unsound of mind, or pauper, or who is under the conviction of treason, felony, or bribery in an election, or who has not been a resident of the State for one year and of the county in which he offers to vote for thirty days next preceding such offer, shall be permitted to vote, while such disability continues.

Results
Choice	Votes	%
Ratification	23,546	78.83%
Rejection	6,323	21.17%
Total votes	29,869	100.00%
Ratification
90–100%
80–90%
70–80%
60–70%
50–60%
Rejection
90–100%
80–90%
70–80%
60–70%
50–60%
No Data/Vote

A referendum was held in West Virginia on April 17, 1871, to add an amendment to the Constitution of West Virginia. Voters were asked whether all adult male citizens of West Virginia should be allowed to vote, though excluding disqualified individuals.

== Background ==
After the Civil War, former Confederates were barred from voting in West Virginia. The voting rights of African Americans were not ensured either. The two divergent issues were brought together in the Flick Amendment, drafted by William H.H. Flick. Several Liberal Republicans, hoping to offset the growth of the Democratic Party, offered the Flick Amendment to voters. The amendment would ensure the voting rights of African Americans and enfranchise former Confederates.

Although the 15th Amendment of the U.S. Constitution, which granted African Americans the right to vote, was ratified in 1870, former Confederates still could not vote.

== Results ==
The amendment was ratified with an overwhelming majority of 78.8%. Following the ratification, former Confederates could vote, leading to a Democratic takeover of West Virginia's politics. Democrats elected the next five governors and controlled the state legislature between 1872 and 1896.

McDowell and Logan counties did not record any votes.

County	For		Against		Ballots cast
County	#	%	#	%	Ballots cast
Barbour	483	68.7%	220	31.2%	703
Berkeley	975	97.2%	28	2.7%	1,003
Boone	209	92.5%	17	7.5%	226
Braxton	524	99.4%	3	0.5%	527
Brooke	320	89.3%	38	10.6%	358
Cabell	431	97.9%	9	2%	440
Calhoun	266	96.3%	10	3.6%	276
Clay	127	97.6%	3	2.3%	130
Doddridge	218	48.5%	231	51.4%	449
Fayette	316	94.6%	18	5.3%	324
Gilmer	303	99.3%	2	0.7%	305
Grant	304	48.0%	329	52.0%	633
Greenbrier	1,044	90.6%	108	9.4%	1,152
Hampshire	521	89.5%	61	10.5%	582
Hancock	181	70.2%	77	29.8%	258
Hardy	58	14.7%	336	85.3%	394
Harrison	485	38.0%	790	62.0%	1,275
Jackson	570	79.8%	144	20.2%	714
Jefferson	438	67.1%	215	32.9%	653
Kanawha	1,164	98.0%	24	2.0%	1,188
Lewis	913	92.0%	79	8.0%	992
Lincoln	559	97.4%	15	2.6%	574
Logan	0	0%	0	0%	0
Marion	1,114	86.3%	177	13.7%	1,291
Marshall	385	39.6%	587	60.4%	972
Mason	702	71.4%	281	28.6%	983
McDowell	0	0%	0	0%	0
Mercer	313	99.1%	3	0.9%	316
Mineral	248	87.6%	35	12.4%	283
Monongalia	756	80.3%	186	19.7%	942
Monroe	618	99.8%	1	0.2%	619
Morgan	189	71.3%	76	28.7%	265
Nicholas	362	93.3%	26	6.7%	388
Ohio	434	54.1%	368	45.9%	802
Pendleton	324	66.8%	161	33.2%	485
Pleasants	211	74.3%	73	25.7%	284
Pocahontas	349	86.0%	57	14.0%	406
Preston	863	86.2%	138	13.8%	1,001
Putnam	380	88.8%	48	11.2%	428
Raleigh	166	73.8%	59	26.2%	225
Randolph	380	92.7%	30	7.3%	410
Ritchie	626	86.5%	98	13.5%	724
Roane	505	93.9%	33	6.1%	538
Summers	255	96.2%	10	3.8%	265
Taylor	364	51.1%	349	48.9%	713
Tucker	133	93.7%	9	6.3%	142
Tyler	330	67.3%	160	32.7%	490
Upshur	327	50.7%	318	49.3%	645
Wayne	608	99.8%	1	0.2%	609
Webster	124	100.0%	0	0.0%	124
Wetzel	386	80.4%	94	19.6%	480
Wirt	381	96.7%	13	3.3%	394
Wood	1,494	89.9%	167	10.1%	1,661
Wyoming	110	93.2%	8	6.8%	118
Totals	23,546	78.8%	6,323	21.1%	29,869
