= History of West Virginia =

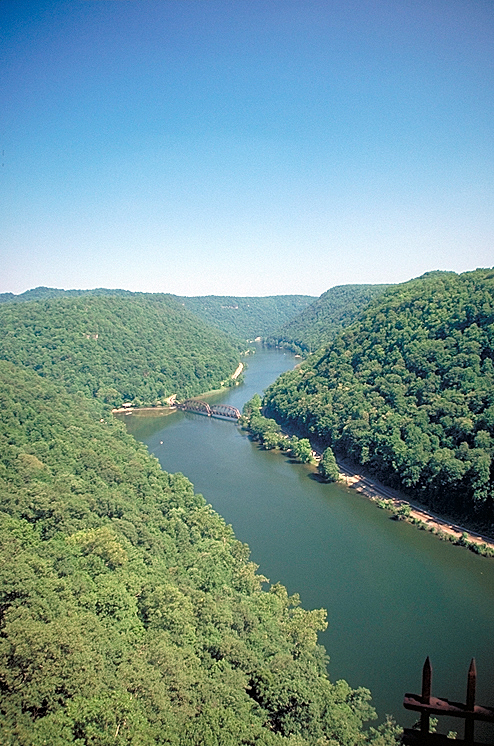
A view of the New River in West Virginia, the world's third-oldest river geologically

The history of West Virginia stems from the 1861 Wheeling Convention, which was an assembly of northwestern Southern Unionists from northwestern counties of the state of Virginia. They formed the Restored Government of Virginia, which purported to represent the government of the entire state of Virginia but in fact only represented those areas controlled by the Union army. It was recognized as the official government of the state of Virginia by Congress, and it repealed the Ordinance of Secession that Virginia made at the start of the American Civil War (1861–1865). It created West Virginia from the western counties under Union Army control. The new state was formed and recognized by the U.S. Congress on June 20, 1863, and protected by the U.S. Army.

The area that comprises West Virginia was originally part of the British Virginia Colony (1607–1776) and the western part of the U.S. Commonwealth of Virginia (1776–1788), and state of Virginia (1788–1863). Western Virginia became sharply divided over the issue of secession from the Union, leading to the separation from Virginia, and formalized by West Virginia's admittance to the Union as a new state in 1863. West Virginia was one of five Civil War border states.

During the late 19th and early 20th century West Virginia saw its population grow, due in large part to the economic job opportunities provided by the coal and logging industries. Underground mining has been replaced by surface mining, which is much safer and employs far fewer workers, Since the mid-20th century, young residents with a good education have left for better paying opportunities elsewhere, so the state has experienced a steady decline in population. West Virginia's history has been profoundly affected by its mountainous terrain, spectacular river valleys, and rich natural resources. These were all factors driving its state economy and the lifestyles of residents, as well as drawing visitors to the state. West Virginia's nickname is the "Mountain State" due to its landscape being largely covered by the Appalachian Mountains.

== Prehistory ==
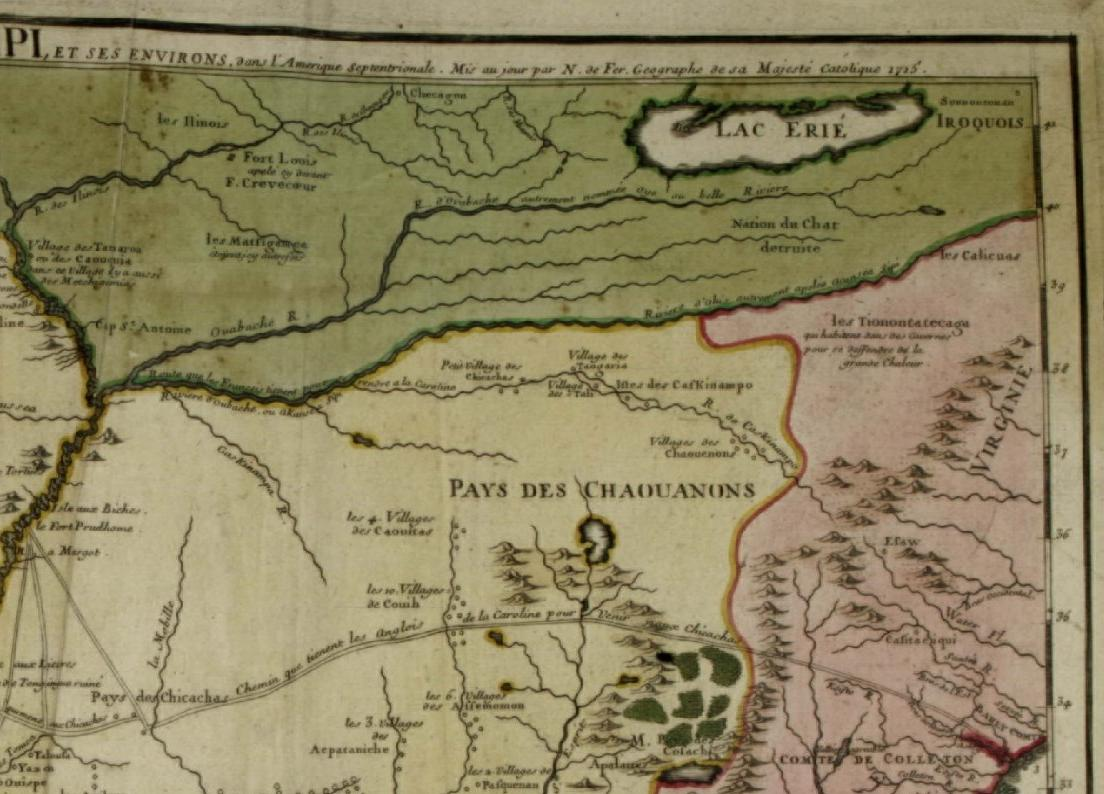
1715 Nicolas de Fer map showing the Native American areas known as Tionontatacaga and Calicuas

The area now known as West Virginia was a favorite hunting ground of numerous Native American peoples before the arrival of European settlers. Many ancient earthen mounds constructed by various mound builder cultures survive, especially in the areas of Moundsville, South Charleston, and Romney. The artifacts uncovered in these give evidence of a village society having a tribal trade system culture that practiced the cold working of copper to a limited extent. As of 2009, over 12,500 archaeological sites have been documented in West Virginia.

Paleo-Indian culture appears by 10,500 BC in West Virginia passing along the major river valleys and ridge-line gap watersheds. Following are the traditional Archaic sub-periods; Early (8000–6000 BC), Middle (6000–4000 BC), and Late (4000–1000 BC). Within the greater region of and neighboring the Mountain State, the Riverton Tradition includes Maple Creek Phase. Also are the Buffalo Phase, Transitional Archaic Phase, Transitional Period Culture and Central Ohio Valley Archaic Phase. Also within the region is the Laurentian Archaic Tradition, which includes Brewerton Phase, Feeley Phase, Dunlop Phase, McKibben Phase, Genesee Phase, Stringtown/Satchel Phase, Satchel Phase and Lamoka/Dustin Phase.

The Adena provided the greatest cultural influence in the state. For practical purposes the Adena is Early Woodland period according to West Virginia University's Dr. Edward V. McMichael, also among the 1963 Geological Survey. Middle and Late Woodland people include Middle Woodland Watson pottery people, Late Woodland Wood Phase, Late Hopewell at Romney, Montana (late Woodland AD 500–1000), Wilhelm culture (Late Middle Woodland, c. AD 1~500), Armstrong (Late Middle Woodland, c. AD 1~500), Buck Garden (Late Woodland AD 500–1200), Childers Phase (Late Middle Woodland c. 400 AD), and Parkline Phase (Late Woodland AD 750~1000). Adena villages can be characterized as rather large compared to Late Prehistoric tribes.

The Adena Indians used ceremonial pipes that were exceptional works of art. They lived in round (double post method) wicker sided and bark sheet roofed houses. Little is known about the housing of Paleo-Indian and Archaic periods, but Woodland Indians lived in wigwams. They grew sunflowers, tubers, gourds, squash and several seeds such as lambsquarter, may grass, sumpweed, smartweed and little barley cereals. In the Fort Ancient period, Indians lived in much larger poled rectangular shaped houses with walls hide covered. They were farmers who cultivated large fields around their villages, concentrating on corn, beans, tubers, sunflowers, gourds and many types of squash including the pumpkin. They also raised domestic turkeys and kept dogs as pets. Their neighbors in the northerly of the state, the Monongahela houses were generally circular in shape often with nook or storage appendage. Their living characteristics were more of a heritage from the Woodland Indians.

The Late Prehistoric (c. AD 950–1650) phases of the Fort Ancient Tradition include Feurt Phase, Blennerhassett Phase, Bluestone Phase, Clover Complex followed by the Orchard Phase (c. AD 1550–1650) with a Late Proto-historic arrival of a Lizard Cult from the Southeastern Ceremonial Complex. Contemporaneously to Fort Ancient Tradition southerly of the state, the sister culture called Monongahela is found on the northerly of the Mountain State stemming from the Drew Tradition.

Historically recorded names of tribes with regards to what is now West Virginia include Calicua, Mohetan, Moneton, Monecaga, Monahan, Tomahitan, Kanawha, Shattara, Shenandoah, Lenape, Ouabano, Guyan, Guyandotte, Little Mingo, Tionontatecaga & Shawnee. Archaeology has shown that the area was mostly divided up between Susquehannocks, Saponi-Tutelo, Manahoac, Fort Ancients & the Monongahela Culture when whites arrived. Among Early Scots-Irish and German settlers, however, Cherokee came to be a catch all term for all Native people and that is a term that pops up most often in the historical record.

A few of these are solvable. Shattara is a Yuchi word, traceable back to a village recorded in Yuchi territory, so it seems they may have split off from the Yuchi when the Coosa Chiefdom (original union of Yuchi and Cherokee peoples in Southern Appalachia) dissolved.

Tionontatecaga is the exact same name used for a small Iroquoian Nation originally from western New York, who had lived between the Haudenosaunee, Neutral Nation and Erie otherwise called the Wenro, Petun or Tobacco. They were the first tribe attacked at the outset of the Beaver Wars in the 1630s and are known to have relocated to the shores of Lake Huron. The placement of this tribe on maps overlaps the Kanawha River and places the Guyandotte frequented, who were also an Iroquoian people known in the area after the Beaver Wars and are often confused with the Wyandot of northern Ohio. Likely, either the Wenro split in the 1630s, with some moving to Canada and others migrating South, or some took refuge among the Erie following the second defeat by the Haudenosaunee and those moved further south after the Erie were defeated in the 1650s, or the Haudenosaunee purposely stationed captured Petun to hold this area for them in a forgotten chapter of the Beaver Wars.

Calicua first appears in DeSoto's accounts of his travels. Given many of the cities he visited collapsed between his visit and colonization of the east coast, many were never quite sure where to place many of the tribes he says he encountered, leading to this term being plastered generally over the area where the Fort Ancients and Monongahela culture were located on maps for many years. It is now believed that this was a village in what is now southern Missouri. Ergo, this tribe may have not even existed in the first place.

Ouabano is not the name of a tribe, but a common Algonquian term for a shaman. It's possible it's even confusing a name of an actual group of Natives associated with the Mohicans that settled in Central Pennsylvania following the Revolutionary War called the Wappinger, until their removal to Wisconsin after 1830, but these Mohicans never formally settled in West Virginia. It usually comes up in claims of Native American Heritage among locals.

Shenandoah were never encountered by whites in any historical account, but were well associated with the Shenandoah Valley and are brought up in the historical record twice. Archaeology shows a war against the occupants of the valley from the north just before the arrival of whites. One account claims the Shenandoah were at war with the Catawba and Tutelo, before being wiped out. All of this comes from the period of the Beaver Wars. What we do know is that Susquehannocks have been shown to have held parts of West Virginia north of the Potomac and east of the Monongahela when whites arrived on the continent. They became involved in the Beaver Wars and eventually lost to the Irpquois and were absorbed by them in the 1680s. Afterwards, the Haudenosaunee went to war with the Manahoac and Saponi, most of whom fled South to live with the Catawba. Along with some allies from "across the mountains" before trying to return in 1701. Several attempts were made by whites to settle West Virginia in the late 1600s, but it was politically argued that the area belonged to the Haudenosaunee. The first settlers were allowed to move in immediately after the Haudenosaunee give up ownership, which seems to coincide with the disappearance of the Shenandoah. The likely conclusion is that the Shenandoah were a group of Susquehannock who were holding the area for the Haudenosaunee and the main front in their war against the Saponi.

Beyond that, the area was mostly known for Lenape, Guyandotte and Shawnee when whites first began moving in. It is believed the Guyandotte merged with the Senecas of Ohio around the 1750s. The Shawnee quickly began abandoning most of West Virginia upon arrival of white settlers and were mostly seen in the southern portions of the state and across the river, in Ohio. They largely left West Virginia altogether following Dunmore's War and most of them were forced to leave the entire region after the Shawnee War, with the last groups relocated West after 1830. A large group of Lenape moved in to the area between the Potomac River in Maryland and the Mahoning River in Ohio, as well as throughout Southern and Central Ohio, after they lost too much land to the Walking Purchase in 1690. The English crown forced the easternmost Lenape to act as a tribe of Haudenosaunee and have an Iroquoian style of government, with chiefs approved by the Haudenosaunee government. Towards the end of the French-Indian Wars, Lenape from Ohio were attacking settlers in West Virginia. Afterwards predicting that this would lead to another forced removal, the eastern Lenape chief, Tamaqua (King Beaver), decided to voluntarily begin relocating his people West in the 1740s-50s. He ended up being correct, with a decree from the royal crown stripping the land between the Potomac and Mahoning Rivers from the Lenape in the 1760s. Most of these Lenape relocated into what is now Tuscarawas and Holmes Counties in Ohio, however the Tuscarawas communities were devastated during the Revolutionary War and the Holmes County settlement followed suit in the early 1800s from a posse of white settlers led by a disgruntled former chief. Afterwards, these eastern Lenape seem to have fully collapsed into the other Lenape communities in central Ohio.

Within the Mountain State these tribal villages can be characterized as rather small and scattered as they moved about the old fields every couple of generations. Many would join other tribes and remove to the midwest regions as settlers arrived in the state. Although, there were those who would acculturate within the historic as sometimes called Fireside Cabin culture. Some are early historic documented seeking protection closer, moving to the easterly colonial trade towns. And later, other small splintered clans were attracted to, among others, James Le Tort, Charles Poke and John Van Metre trading houses within the state. This historic period changed the way of living extends from a little before the 18th century Virginia and Pennsylvania region North American fur trade beginning on the Eastern Panhandle of the state.

== European exploration and settlement ==
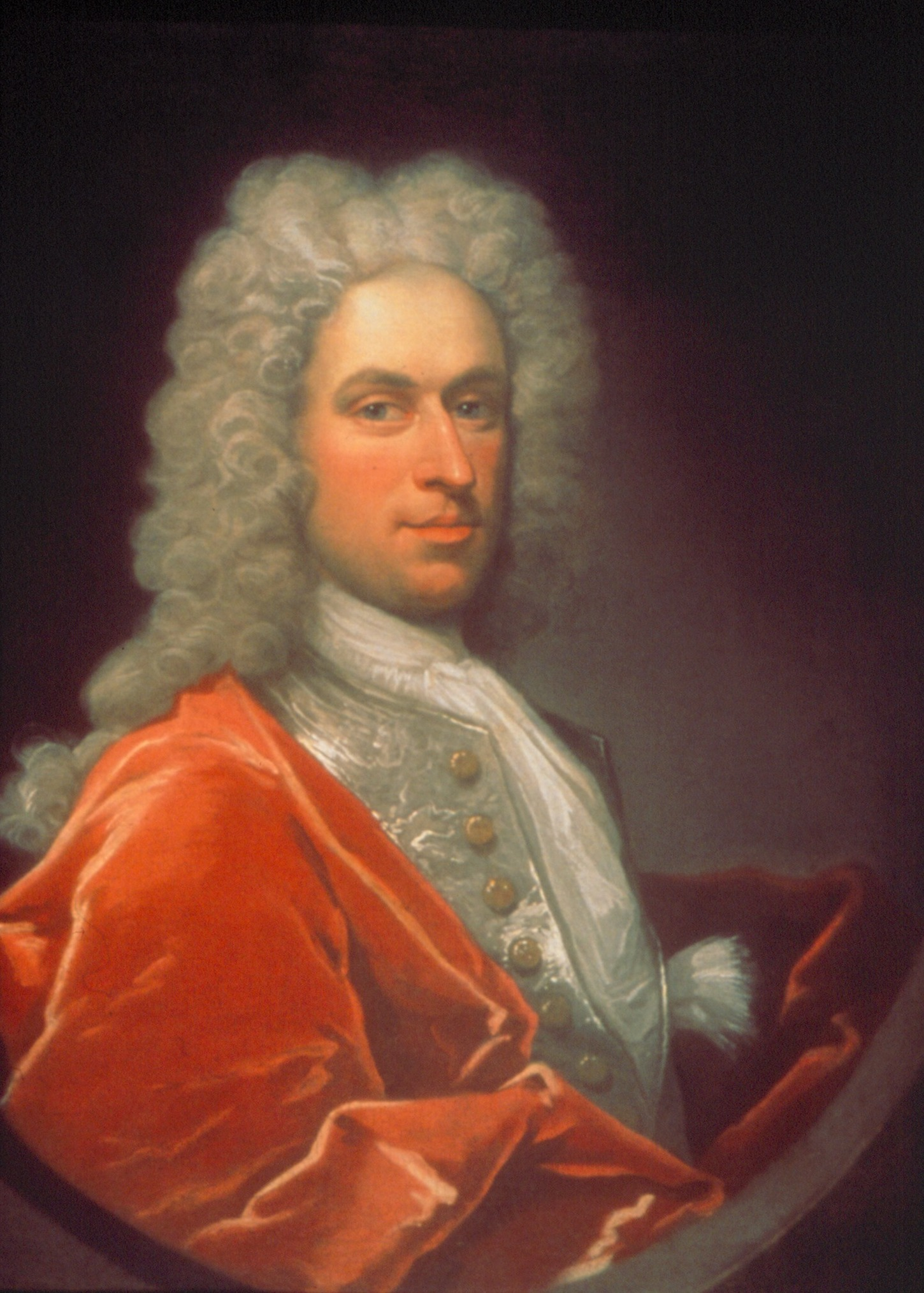
Thomas Lee, the first manager of the Ohio Company of Virginia

In 1671 General Abraham Wood, at the direction of Royal Governor William Berkeley of the Virginia Colony, sent the party of Thomas Batts and Robert Fallum into the West Virginia area. During this expedition the pair followed a tributary of the Kanawha River they named Woods River for their sponsor, and discovered Kanawha Falls. Their journey continued northward (upriver) or westward over land, and there is ambiguity where they went.

On July 13, 1709, Louis Michel, George Ritter, and Baron Christoph von Graffenried petitioned the King of England for a land grant in the Harpers Ferry, Shepherdstown area, Jefferson County, to establish a Swiss colony. Neither the land grant or the Swiss colony ever materialized.

Lt. Governor Alexander Spotswood is sometimes credited with taking his 1716 "Knights of the Golden Horseshoe Expedition" into what is now Pendleton County, although according to contemporary accounts, Spotswood's trail went no farther west than Harrisonburg, Virginia. The Treaty of Albany, 1722, designated the Blue Ridge Mountains as the western boundary of white settlement, and recognized Haudenosaunee rights on the west side of the ridge, including all of West Virginia. Though the Haudenosaunee made little effort to settle the region themselves, they made war throughout the area with their enemies, following the Great Indian Warpaths through the region and, some time between 1725 and 1750, contracted a large group of the Saponi-Tutelo warriors the Haudenosaunee had living on the Susquehanna River in Pennsylvania to fight alongside them in the region.

Other tribes, notably the Shawnee and Cherokee, used the resources of the region as well. Soon after this, white settlers began moving into the Greater Shenandoah-Potomac Valley making up the entire eastern portion of the state. They found it largely unoccupied, apart from Tuscaroras who had lately moved into the area around Martinsburg, WV, some Shawnee villages in the region around Moorefield, WV and Winchester, VA, and frequent passing bands of "Northern Indians" (Lenape from the Delaware Valley) and "Southern Indians" (Catawba from South Carolina) who were engaged in a bitter long-distance war, using the Valley as a battleground.

John Van Metre, an Indian trader, penetrated into the northern portion of West Virginia in 1725. Also in 1725, Pearsall's Flats in the South Branch Potomac River valley, present-day Romney, was settled, and later became the site of the French and Indian War stockade, Fort Pearsall. Morgan ap Morgan, a Welshman, built a cabin near present-day Bunker Hill in Berkeley County in 1727. The same year German settlers from Pennsylvania founded New Mecklenburg, the present Shepherdstown, on the Potomac River, and others soon followed.

Orange County, Virginia was formed in 1734. It included all areas west of the Blue Ridge Mountains, constituting all of present West Virginia. However, in 1736 the Haudenosaunee Six Nations protested Virginia's colonization beyond the demarcated Blue Ridge, and a skirmish was fought in 1743. The Haudenosaunee were on the point of threatening all-out war against the Virginia Colony over the "Cohongoruton lands", which would have been destructive and devastating, when Governor Gooch bought out their claim for 400 pounds at the Treaty of Lancaster (1744).

In 1661 King Charles II of England had granted a company of gentlemen the land between the Potomac and Rappahannock rivers, known as the Northern Neck. The grant eventually came into the possession of Thomas Fairfax, 6th Lord Fairfax of Cameron and in 1746 a stone was erected at the source of the North Branch Potomac River to mark the western limit of the grant. A considerable part of this land was surveyed by George Washington, especially the South Branch Potomac River valley between 1748 and 1751. The diary kept by Washington indicates that there were already many squatters, largely of German origin, along the South Branch. Christopher Gist, a surveyor for the first Ohio Company, which was composed chiefly of Virginians, explored the country along the Ohio River north of the mouth of the Kanawha River in 1751 and 1752. The company sought to have a fourteenth colony established with the name Vandalia.

=== Early river traffic ===
1751 Fry-Jefferson map showing early ferries and established colonial borders before the French And Indian War

By 1739 Thomas Shepherd had constructed a flour mill powered by water from the Town Run or the Falling Springs Branch of the Potomac River in present-day Shepherdstown.

In October 1748 the Virginia General Assembly passed an act establishing a ferry across the Potomac River from the landing of Evan Watkin near the mouth of Conococheague Creek in present-day Berkeley County to the property of Edmund Wade in Maryland. In March 1761, Robert Harper obtained a permit to operate a ferry across the Shenandoah River at present-day Harpers Ferry, Jefferson County. The two ferry crossings became the earliest locations of government authorized civilian commercial crafts on what would become a part of the West Virginia Waterways.

During the late 17th and early 18th centuries a growing demand for beaver sent trappers up and down the Kanawha region's tributary creeks by canoe and raft. Trading posts were established at the confluence of the Ohio and Kanawha Rivers at Point Pleasant, West Virginia where, in the mid-1780s, Daniel Boone resided for several years. Likewise, St. Albans, West Virginia, at the confluence of the Kanawha and Coal Rivers, became a point of trade.

In the late 18th century the steel trap increased efficiency, and beaver became scarce. A shift to exporting the state's other natural resources began. Kanawha salt production followed by coal and timber could be seen on the waterways. A number of riverside locations were used for early Industrial Revolution production. Keelboats were built in the Kanawha region in Leon, Ravenswood Murraysville, and Little Kanawha River. 19th century steamboats were built and repaired in Wheeling, Parkersburg, Point Pleasant and Mason City. Wooden coal barges were built on the Monongahela River near Morgantown, as well as along Coal River and Elk River.

The logging industry furthered the river shipping industry. A horse-drawn logging "tram" with a special block and tackle for hill-side harvesting was brought into use, allowing expansion of Crooked Creek and the opening of a wooden barrel plant at the creek's mouth. In the 1880s, this tram and other steam machinery were used for collecting timber used as railroad ties in the railway construction along the Kanawha river. Railroad spurs were built throughout West Virginia, connecting mines to the riverboats, barges and coal-tipples.

== Trans-Allegheny Virginia, 1768–1788 ==
Many settlers crossed the mountains after 1750, though they were hindered by Native American resistance. The 1744 Treaty of Lancaster had left ambiguous whether the Haudenosaunee had sold only as far as the Alleghenies, or all their claim south of the Ohio, including the rest of modern West Virginia. At the convening of the 1752 Treaty of Logstown, they acknowledged the right of English settlements south of the Ohio, but the Cherokee and Shawnee claims still remained. During the French and Indian War (1754–1763), the scattered settlements were almost destroyed. The Proclamation of 1763 again confirmed all land beyond the Alleghenies as Indian Territory, but the Haudenosaunee finally relinquished their claims south of the Ohio to Britain at the Treaty of Fort Stanwix in 1768. Most of the Cherokee claim within West Virginia, the southwestern part of the state, was sold to Virginia in 1770 by the Treaty of Lochaber. Most early settlement was wildcat, with specious ("tomahawk") claims, and without organized governments.

Sustained settlement started with the creation of Fincastle County, Virginia in 1772, representing trans-Allegheny Virginia, encompassing most of West Virginia, all of Kentucky, and part of the "tail" of today's Virginia. In 1774, the Crown Governor of Virginia, John Murray, 4th Earl of Dunmore, led a force over the mountains, and a body of militia under Colonel Andrew Lewis dealt the Shawnee Indians under Cornstalk a crushing blow at the junction of the Kanawha and Ohio rivers, in the Battle of Point Pleasant. Following this conflict, known as Dunmore's War, the Shawnee and Mingo ceded their rights south of the Ohio, that is, to West Virginia and Kentucky.

Fort Henry in present-day Wheeling played an important role in the Western theater of the American Revolutionary War. British-allied Native tribes besieged the American militia there in 1777 and again in 1782. The battles ended in American victory and boosted morale with the heroic tale of McColloch's Leap. Renegade Cherokee chief Dragging Canoe continued to dispute the settlers' advance, fighting the Cherokee–American wars (1776–1794) until after the American Revolutionary War. During the war, the settlers in western Virginia were generally active patriots and many served in the Continental Army.

Historical population
Census	Pop.	Note	%±
1790	55,873		—
1800	78,592		40.7%
1810	105,469		34.2%
1820	136,808		29.7%
1830	176,924		29.3%
1840	224,537		26.9%
1850	302,313		34.6%
1860	376,688		24.6%
1870	442,014		17.3%
1880	618,457		39.9%
1890	762,794		23.3%
1900	958,800		25.7%
1910	1,221,119		27.4%
1920	1,463,701		19.9%
1930	1,729,205		18.1%
1940	1,901,974		10.0%
1950	2,005,552		5.4%
1960	1,860,421		−7.2%
1970	1,744,237		−6.2%
1980	1,949,644		11.8%
1990	1,793,477		−8.0%
2000	1,808,344		0.8%
2010	1,852,994		2.5%
2020	1,793,716		−3.2%
2024 (est.)	1,769,979		−1.3%
Source:1910–2020; 2024

== 1789 to 1861 ==
Social conditions in western Virginia were entirely unlike those in the eastern portion of the state. The population was not homogeneous, as a considerable part of the immigration came by way of Pennsylvania and included Germans, Protestant Scots-Irish, and settlers from the states farther north. Counties in the east and south were settled mostly by eastern Virginians. During the American Revolution, the movement to create a state west of the Alleghenies was revived and a petition for the establishment of "Westsylvania" was presented to Congress, on the grounds that the mountains presented an almost impassable barrier to the east. The rugged nature of the country made slavery unprofitable, and time only increased the social, political, economic, and cultural differences between the two sections of Virginia.

In 1829 a constitutional convention met in Richmond to consider reforms to Virginia's outdated constitution. Philip Doddridge of Brooke County championed the cause of western Virginians who sought a more democratic frame of government. However, western reforms were rejected by leaders from east of the Alleghenies who "clung to political power in an effort to preserve their plantation lifestyles dependent on enslaving blacks." Virginia leaders maintained a property qualification for suffrage effectively disenfranchising poorer farmers in the west, whose families did much of the farm work themselves. In addition, the Virginia Constitutional Convention of 1829–1830 gave the slave-owning counties the benefit of three-fifths of their slave population in apportioning representation in the Virginia Assembly. As a result, every county west of the Alleghenies except one voted to reject the constitution, which nevertheless passed because of eastern support. Failure of the eastern planter elite to make constitutional reforms exacerbated existing east–west sectionalism in Virginia and contributed to Virginia's later split.

The Virginia Constitutional Convention of 1850–51, the Reform Convention, addressed a number of issues important to western Virginians. It extended the vote to all white males 21 years or older. The governor, lieutenant-governor, the judiciary, sheriffs, and other county officers were to be elected by public vote. The composition of the General Assembly was changed. Representation in the House of Delegates was apportioned on the basis of the census of 1850, counting whites only. The Senate representation was arbitrarily fixed at 50 seats, with the west receiving twenty, and the east thirty senators. This was made acceptable to the west by a provision that required the General Assembly to reapportion representation on the basis of white population in 1865, or else put the matter to a public referendum. But the east also gave itself a tax advantage in requiring a property tax at true and actual value, except for slaves. Slaves under the age of 12 years were not taxed and slaves over that age were taxed at only $300, a fraction of their true value. Small farmers, however, had all their assets, animals, and land taxed at full value. Despite this tax and the lack of internal improvements in the west, the vote was 75,748 for and 11,063 against the new Constitution. Most of the opposition came from delegates from eastern counties, who did not like the compromises made for the west.

For the western areas, problems included the long inconvenient distance from the state seat of government in Richmond and the difference of common economic interests resultant from the tobacco and food crops farming, fishing, and coastal shipping to the east of the Eastern Continental Divide (waters which drain to the Atlantic Ocean) along the Allegheny Mountains, and the interests of the western portion which drained to the Ohio and Mississippi rivers and the Gulf of Mexico.

The western area focused its commerce on neighbors to the west, and many citizens felt that the more populous eastern areas were too dominant in the Virginia General Assembly and insensitive to their needs. Major crises in the Virginia state government over these differences were averted on more than one occasion during the period before the American Civil War, but the underlying problems were fundamental and never well resolved. Given these differences, many in the west had long contemplated a separate state. In particular, men such as lawyer Francis H. Pierpont from Fairmont, had long chafed under the political domination of the Tidewater and Piedmont slave-holders. In addition to differences over the abolition of slavery, he and allies felt the Virginia government ignored and refused to spend funds on needed internal improvements in the west, such as turnpikes and railroads.

=== John Brown at Harpers Ferry, 1859 ===
John Brown (1800–1859), an abolitionist who saw slavery as a sin against God, led a highly aggressive and violent anti-slavery movement in Kansas. He next planned to strike a decisive blow against Southern slavery, creating a massive "underground railroad"–type project, in the central and southern Appalachian Mountains, that would assist the enslaved in running away and becoming free. He had secret funding from the abolitionists in Massachusetts. With only 21 followers, in October 1859 he took hostages and freed slaves in Harpers Ferry, in what is now West Virginia. Locals forced him to take refuge in the Armory firehouse, later called "John Brown's Fort"; a unit of U.S. Marines led by Robert E. Lee stormed the firehouse and took Brown prisoner, almost killing him. Brown was quickly convicted of treason against the Commonwealth of Virginia, murder, and fomenting a slave insurrection, and was hanged on December 2. Six followers were also tried, convicted, and executed. The episode enraged the pro-slavery South, which feared it portended more abolitionist violence against them.

== Civil War and split ==
In 1861, as Virginia seceded from the United States and joined the Confederate States of America, the stage was set for the American Civil War (1861–1865). Virginia was a main theatre of warfare from first to last. Union military forces controlled the western counties of Virginia. Local politicians now set up a new government recognized by Congress as the true statewide government of Virginia. The new state government authorized the formation of a separate state of West Virginia and it was recognized by President Lincoln and Congress.

=== Separation ===
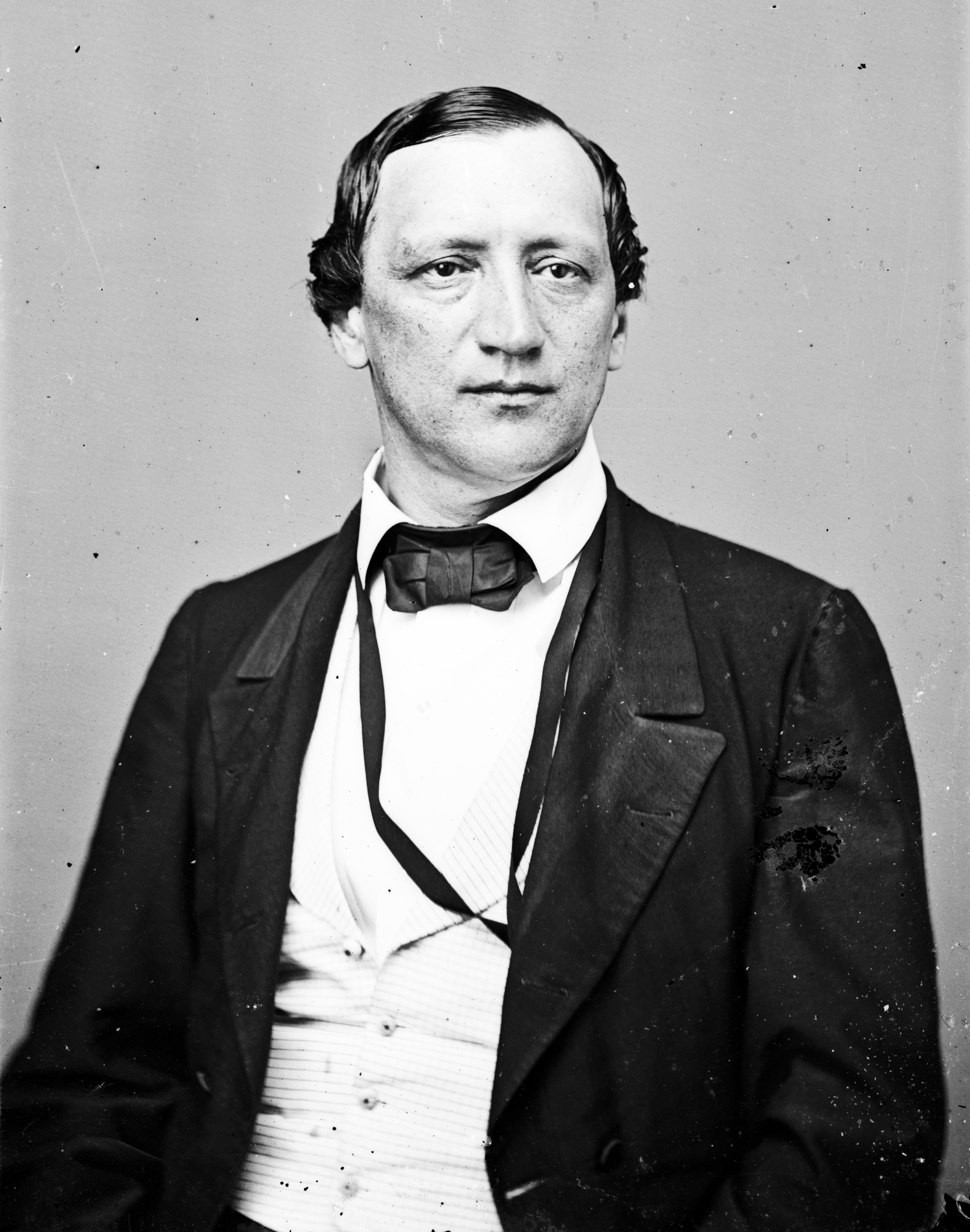
John S. Carlile, a leader during the First Wheeling Convention

On April 17, 1861, the Richmond convention voted on the Ordinance of Secession. Of the 49 delegates from the future state of West Virginia, 17 voted in favor, and 30 voted against, and two abstained. Almost immediately after the adoption of the ordinance, a mass meeting at Clarksburg recommended that each county in northwestern Virginia send delegates to a convention to meet in Wheeling on May 13, 1861.

When the First Wheeling Convention met, 425 delegates from 25 counties were present, but a division of sentiment soon arose. Some delegates favored the immediate formation of a new state, while others argued that, as Virginia's secession had not yet been ratified or become effective, such action would constitute revolution against the United States. It was decided that if the ordinance was adopted (of which there was little doubt) another convention including the members-elect of the legislature should meet at Wheeling in June 1861.

In a referendum on May 23, 1861, secession was ratified by a large majority in the state as a whole. But in the western counties that would form the state of West Virginia, the vote was approximately 34,677 against and 19,121 for ratification of the Ordinance of Secession.

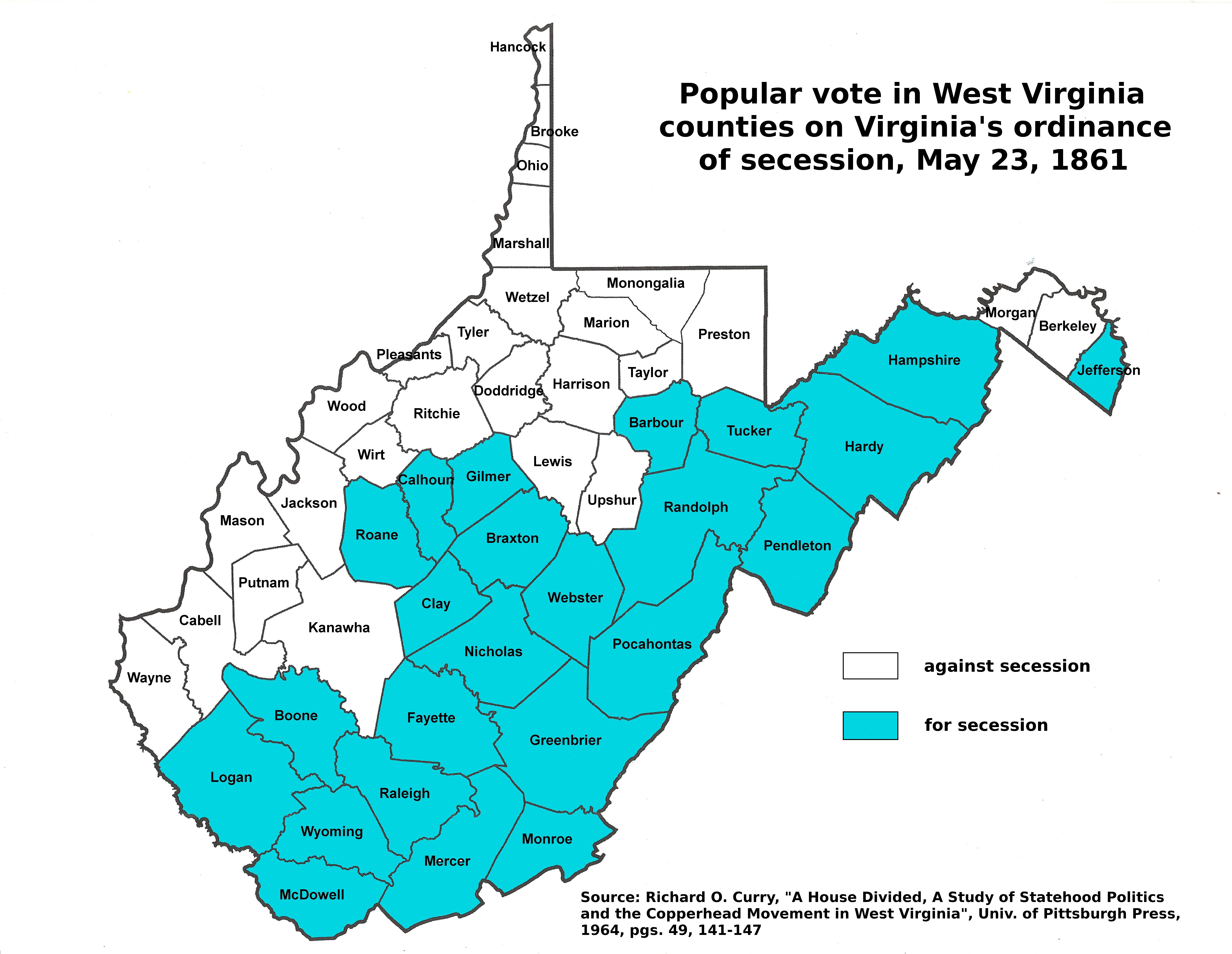
Counties (in blue) approving Virginia's secession from the U.S. in order to join the Confederacy.

The Second Wheeling Convention met as agreed on June 11, 1861, and adopted "A Declaration of the People of Virginia". This document, drafted by former state senator John S. Carlile, declared that the Virginia Declaration of Rights required any substantial change in the nature or form of the state government to be approved by the people. Therefore, since the Secession Convention had been called by the legislature and not the people, all its acts were illegal. It further declared the pro-secession government in Richmond void and called for a reorganization of the state government, taking the line that all who adhered to the Ordinance of Secession had effectively vacated their offices. The convention passed an act for the reorganization of the government on June 19, 1861. On the following day, the convention chose Francis H. Pierpont as governor of the "Restored Government of Virginia", elected other officers, and adjourned. The legislature of the Restored Government was composed of members from the western counties who had been elected on May 23, 1861, and some senators who had been elected in 1859. It met at Wheeling on July 1, 1861, filled the remainder of the state offices, completed the reorganization of the state government, and elected two United States senators who were quickly seated in Washington. There were, therefore, two governments claiming to represent all of Virginia, one owing allegiance to the United States and one to the Confederacy.

Even before the American Civil War, some people in northwest Virginia had desired to break away from Virginia to form a new state. However, the federal Constitution did not allow a new state unless the old state gave its consent. Soon after the Union government declared that the Restored Government was the legitimate government of the Commonwealth, the Restored Government asserted its authority to give such approval. It authorized the creation of the State of Kanawha, consisting of most of the counties that now comprise West Virginia. A little over one month later, Kanawha was renamed West Virginia. The Wheeling Convention, which had taken a recess until August 6, 1861, reassembled on August 20, 1861, and called for a popular vote on the formation of a new state and for a convention to frame a constitution if the vote should be favorable.

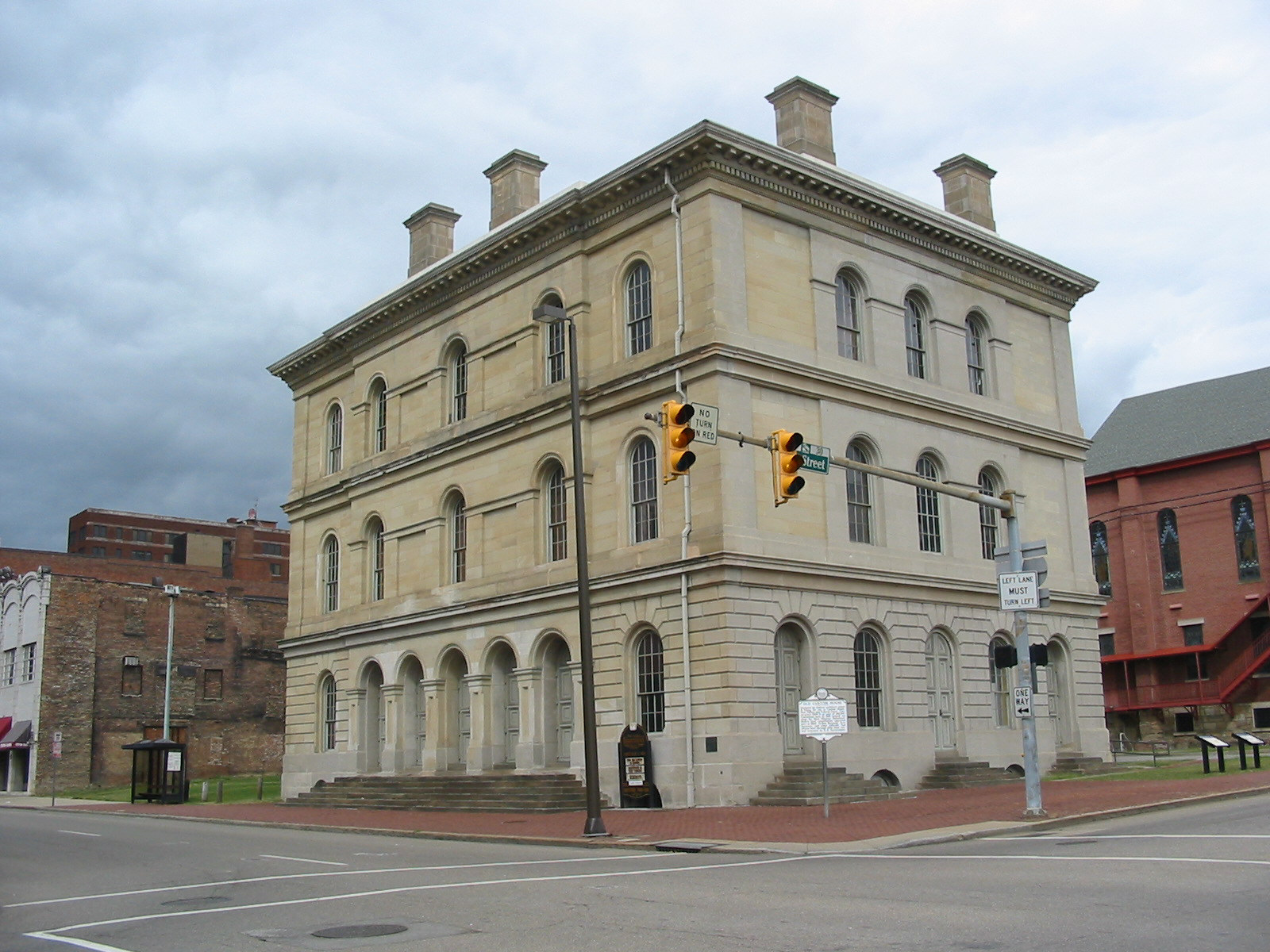
West Virginia Independence Hall, site of the Wheeling Convention

In the election held on October 24, 1861, 18,408 votes were cast for the new state and only 781 against. At this time, West Virginia had nearly 70,000 qualified voters, and the May 23, 1861 vote to secede had drawn nearly 54,000 voters. However, most of the pro-Confederate elements no longer considered themselves citizens of the United States; they saw themselves as citizens of another country (the Confederacy) and did not vote in elections sponsored by the United States. Votes from the secessionist counties in the October 24 vote on statehood were mostly cast by refugees in the area around Wheeling, not in the counties themselves. In secessionist counties where a poll was conducted it was by military intervention. Even in some counties that had voted against secession, such as Wayne and Cabell, it was necessary to send in Union soldiers.

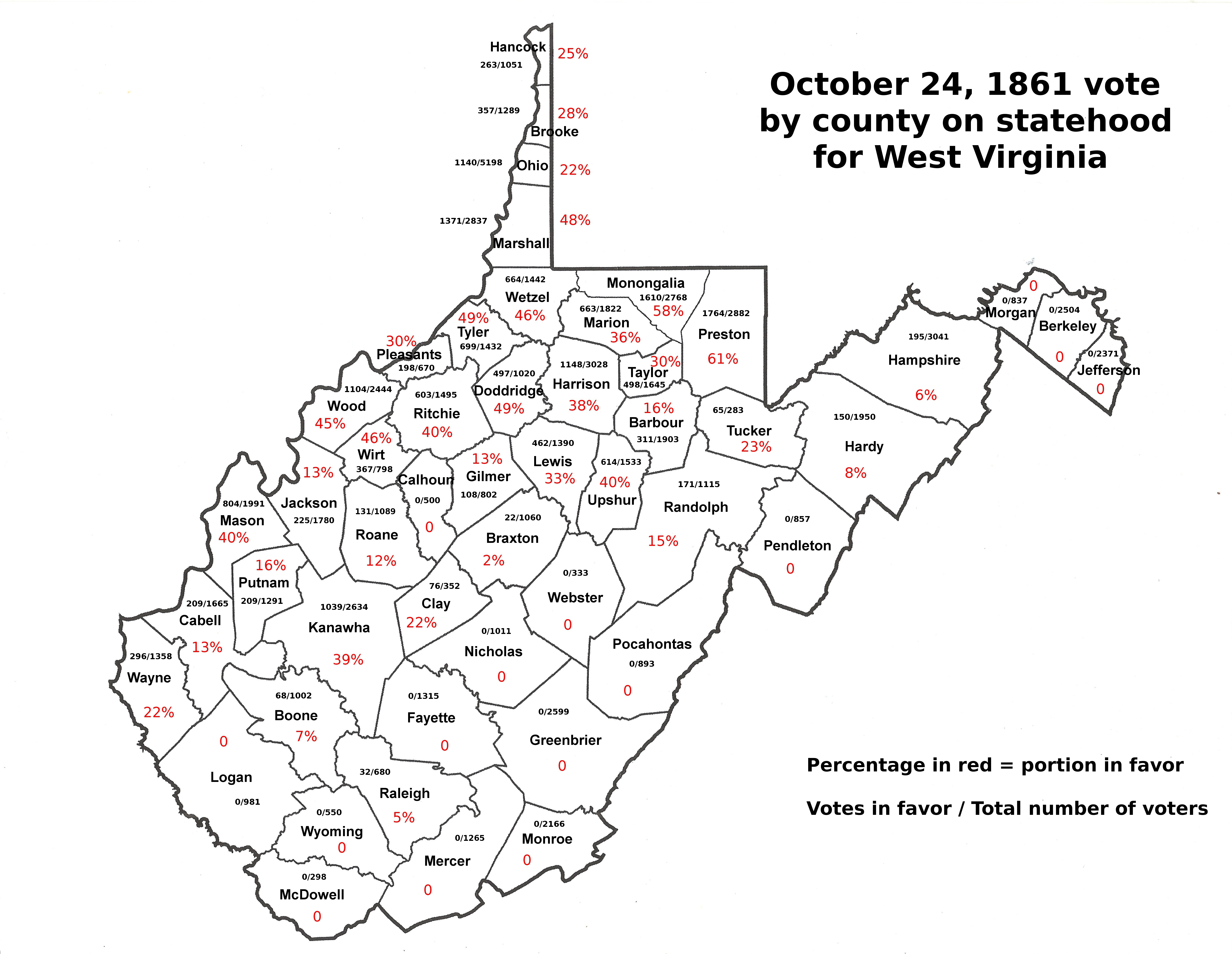
Turnout by county in the October 24, 1861, West Virginia statehood vote

Returns from some counties were as low as 5%, e.g. Raleigh County 32–0 in favor of statehood, Clay 76–0, Braxton 22–0, and some gave no returns at all. The Constitutional Convention began on November 26, 1861, and finished its work on February 18, 1862. The instrument was ratified on April 11, 1862, with 18,162 votes for and 514 against.

The composition of all three Wheeling Conventions, the May (First) Convention, the June (Second) Convention, and the Constitutional Convention, was of an irregular nature. The members of the May Convention were chosen by groups of Unionists, mostly in the far Northwestern counties. Over one-third came from the counties around the northern panhandle. The May Convention resolved to meet again in June 1861 should the Ordinance of Secession be ratified by public poll on May 23, 1861, which was the case. The June 1861 convention consisted of 104 members, 35 of which were members of the General Assembly in Richmond, some elected in the May 23 vote, and some hold-over State Senators. Arthur Laidley, elected to the General Assembly from Cabell County, attended the June Convention but refused to take part. The other delegates to the June Convention were "chosen even more irregularly-some in mass meetings, others by county committee, and still others were seemingly self-appointed". It was this June Convention which drafted the statehood resolution. The Constitutional Convention met in November 1861, and consisted of 61 members. Its composition was just as irregular. A delegate representing Logan County was accepted as a member of this body, though he did not live in Logan County, and his "credentials consisted of a petition signed by fifteen persons representing six families". The large number of Northerners in this convention caused great distrust over the new Constitution during Reconstruction years. In 1872, under the leadership of Samuel Price, former Lt. Governor of Virginia, the Wheeling constitution was discarded, and an entirely new one was written along ante-bellum principles.

At first the Wheeling politicians controlled only a small part of West Virginia. However, federal forces soon drove the Confederates out of most of West Virginia.

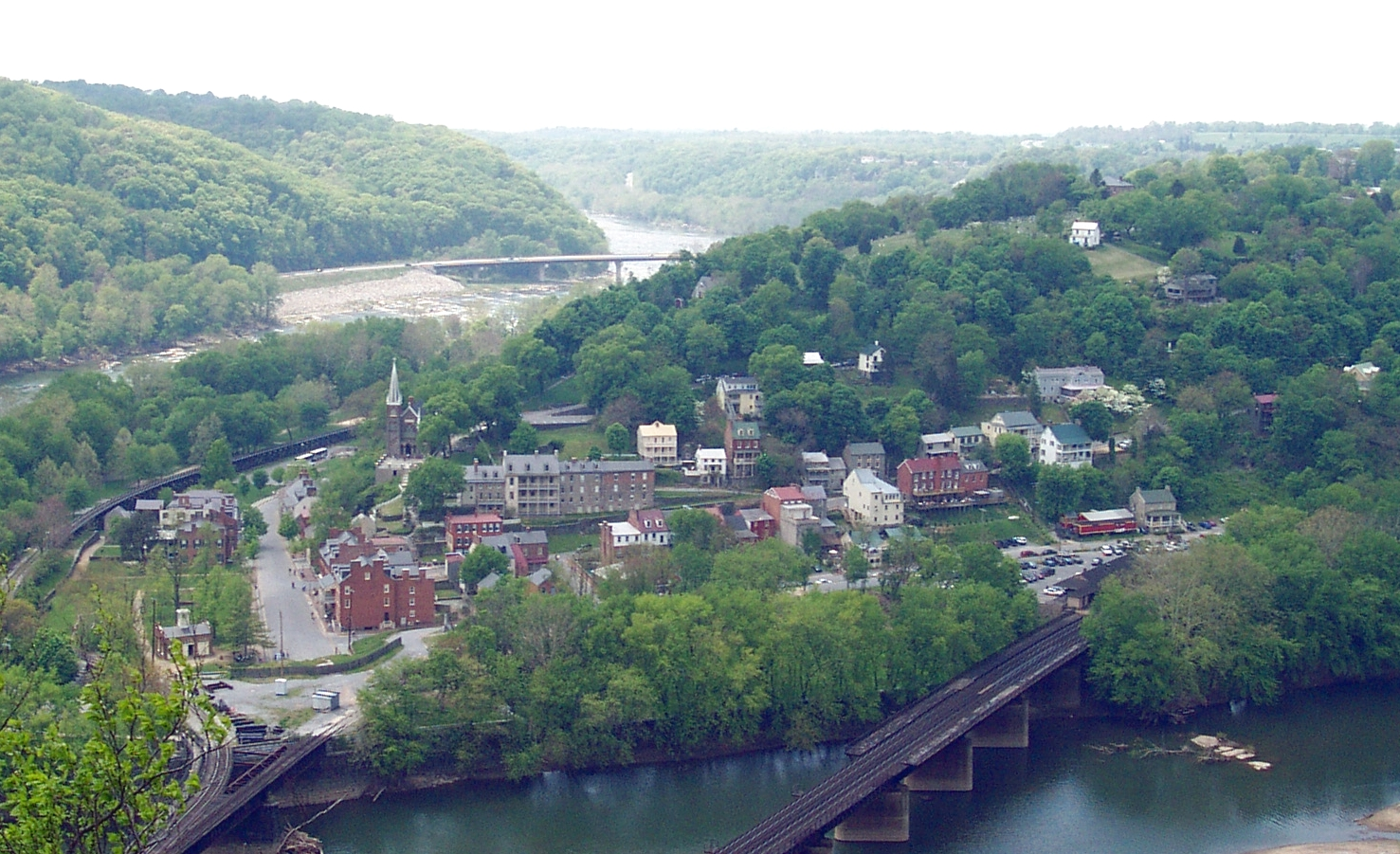
Harpers Ferry, West Virginia, changed hands a dozen times during the American Civil War.

On May 13, 1862, the state legislature of the reorganized government approved the formation of the new state. An application for admission to the Union was made to Congress. On December 31, 1862, an enabling act was approved by President Lincoln, admitting West Virginia on the condition that a provision for the gradual abolition of slavery be inserted in the Constitution. The convention was reconvened on February 12, 1863, and the demand was met. The revised constitution was adopted on March 26, 1863, and on April 20, 1863, President Lincoln issued a proclamation admitting the state at the end of 60 days, on June 20, 1863. Meanwhile, officers for the new state were chosen, and Governor Pierpont moved the Restored Government to Alexandria from which he asserted jurisdiction over the counties of Virginia within the federal lines.

=== Legality ===
The constitutionality of the new state was achieved when the Unionist government of Virginia approved the division. The question of the addition of two counties came before the Supreme Court of the United States in the case of Virginia v. West Virginia, 78 U.S. 39 (1871). Berkeley and Jefferson counties lying on the Potomac east of the mountains, in 1863, with the consent of the Reorganized government of Virginia voted in favor of annexation to West Virginia. Many men absent in the Confederate army when the vote was taken refused to acknowledge the transfer upon their return. The Virginia General Assembly repealed the act of cession and in 1866 brought suit against West Virginia asking the court to declare the two counties a part of Virginia. Meanwhile, Congress on March 10, 1866, passed a joint resolution recognizing the transfer. The Supreme Court decided in favor of West Virginia, and there has been no further question.

=== Civil War ===
Virginia was a main battlefield and suffered heavily during the war but West Virginia escaped serious damage. General George B. McClellan's forces gained possession of the greater part of the territory in the summer of 1861. Following Confederate General Robert E. Lee's defeat at Cheat Mountain in September 1861, supremacy in western Virginia was never again seriously challenged. In 1863, General John D. Imboden, with 4,500 Confederate soldiers, overran a small portion of the new state, then pulled back after a month. More serious was the threat from time to time of bands of guerrillas that burned and plundered in some sections.

Estimates of the numbers of soldiers from West Virginia, both Union and Confederate, have varied widely; recent studies have placed the numbers about equal, from 22,000 to 25,000 each.

The low vote turnout for the statehood referendum was due to many factors. On June 19, 1861, the Wheeling convention enacted a bill entitled "Ordinance to Authorize the Apprehending of Suspicious Persons in Time of War" which stated that anyone who supported Richmond or the Confederacy "shall be deemed... subjects or citizens of a foreign State or power at war with the United States." Many private citizens were arrested by federal authorities at the request of Wheeling and interned in prison camps, most notably Camp Chase in Columbus, Ohio. Soldiers were also stationed at the polls to discourage secessionists and their supporters. In addition, a large portion of the state was secessionist, and any polls there had to be conducted under military intervention. The vote was further compromised by the presence of an undetermined number of non-resident soldier votes.

At the Constitutional Convention on December 14, 1861, the issue of slavery was raised by Rev. Gordon Battelle, an Ohio native who sought to introduce a resolution for gradual emancipation. Granville Parker, originally from Massachusetts and a member of the convention, described the scene – "I discovered on that occasion as I never had before, the mysterious and over-powering influence 'the peculiar institution' had on men otherwise sane and reliable. Why, when Mr. Battelle submitted his resolutions, a kind of tremor – a holy horror, was visible throughout the house!" Instead of Rev. Battelle's resolution a policy of "Negro exclusion" for the new state was adopted to keep any new slaves, or freemen, from taking up residence, in the hope that this would satisfy abolitionist sentiment in Congress. When the statehood bill reached Congress, however, the lack of an emancipation clause prompted opposition from Senator Charles Sumner and Senator Benjamin Wade of Ohio. A compromise was reached known as the Willey Amendment which was approved by Unionist voters in the state on March 26, 1863. It called for the gradual emancipation of slaves based on age after July 4, 1863. Slavery was officially abolished by West Virginia on February 3, 1865. To note, it took the ratification of the 13th Amendment to the U.S. Constitution accomplished on December 6, 1865, to abolish slavery nationwide.

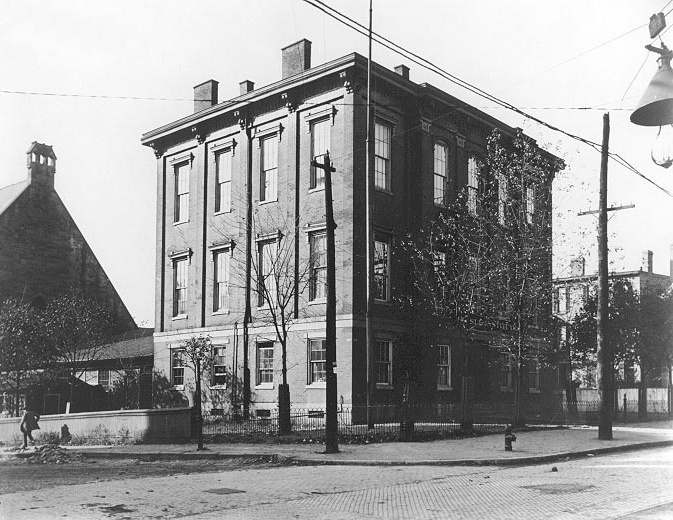
The Linsly Institute building in Wheeling, West Virginia served as the state's first capitol building from statehood in 1863 until March 28, 1870, when the capitol was transferred to Charleston, West Virginia

During the war and for years afterward partisan feeling ran high. Many Confederates lost property and they all lost the right to vote. In 1866, a state constitutional amendment disfranchising all who had given aid and comfort to the Confederacy was adopted. The addition of the 14th and 15th Amendments to the United States Constitution caused a reaction, The Democrats rejected the penalties. They returned to power in 1870, and in 1871, the Constitutional Amendment of 1866 was abrogated. On August 22, 1872, an entirely new constitution was adopted that was favorable to the ex-Confederates.

Following the war Virginia unsuccessfully brought a case to the Supreme Court challenging the secession of Berkeley County and Jefferson County to West Virginia. (Five more counties were formed later, to result in the current 55).

=== Enduring disputes ===
Beginning in Reconstruction, and for several decades thereafter, the two states disputed the new state's share of the pre-war Virginia government's debt, which had mostly been incurred to finance public infrastructure improvements, such as canals, roads, and railroads under the Virginia Board of Public Works. Virginians led by former Confederate General William Mahone formed a political coalition based upon this theory, the Readjuster Party. Although West Virginia's first constitution provided for the assumption of a part of the Virginia debt, negotiations opened by Virginia in 1870 were fruitless, and in 1871 that state funded two-thirds of the debt and arbitrarily assigned the remainder to West Virginia. The issue was finally settled in 1915, when the United States Supreme Court ruled that West Virginia owed Virginia $12,393,929.50. The final installment of this sum was paid off in 1939.

Disputes about the exact location of the border in some of the northern mountain reaches between Loudoun County, Virginia and Jefferson County, West Virginia continued well into the 20th century. In 1991, both state legislatures appropriated money for a boundary commission to look into 15 miles (24 km) of the border area.

In recent years there has been serious talk about the possibility of certain counties in the Eastern Panhandle rejoining the Commonwealth of Virginia. Frustrated by bad economic conditions and what they perceive to be neglect from the Charleston government, this movement has gained at least some momentum. In 2011, West Virginia state delegate Larry Kump sponsored legislation to allow Morgan, Berkeley, and Jefferson counties to rejoin Virginia by popular vote.

== Industrialization ==
Before the 1890s small time family farms dominated the economy, with corn grown to feed animals and wheat as the main cash crop. The river system provided the main transportation routes. Mountainous areas had many small subsistence farms. There was hunting and some lumber sales but otherwise with little commercial activity.

=== Railroad network ===
Industrialization was led by the big railroads with heavy national funding and the goal of integrating the state with the fast growing national markets on the East Coast and Midwest. The Baltimore and Ohio continued to dominate urban centers in the north. The Chesapeake and Ohio Railway arrived in 1873, which connected southern districts to eastern markets and enabled remote mines to turn a profit. By 1879 it shipped a thousand tons of coal a day. The Norfolk and Western opened up more coal mining districts. Many smaller lines were created to link remote areas to the main rail network.

==== Chesapeake and Ohio Railway ====
The completion of the Chesapeake and Ohio Railway (C&O) westerly across the state from Richmond, Virginia to the new city of Huntington on the Ohio River in 1872 opened access to the New River Coalfield. Within 10 years, the C&O was building tracks east from Richmond down the Virginia Peninsula to reach its huge coal pier at the new city of Newport News, Virginia on the large harbor of Hampton Roads. There, city founder Collis P. Huntington also developed what would become the largest shipbuilder in the world, Newport News Shipbuilding and Drydock Company. Among its many products, the shipyard began building ocean-going ships, known as colliers, to transport coal to other eastern ports (notably in New England) and overseas.

==== Norfolk and Western ====
In 1881 the new Philadelphia-based owners of William Mahone's former Atlantic, Mississippi and Ohio Railroad (AM&O) which stretched across Virginia's southern tier from Norfolk, had sights clearly set on the Mountain State, where the owners had large land holdings. Their railroad was renamed Norfolk and Western (N&W), and a new railroad city was developed at Roanoke to handle planned expansion. After its new President Frederick J. Kimball and a small party journeyed by horseback and saw firsthand the rich bituminous coal seam (which Kimball's wife named "Pocahontas"), the N&W redirected its planned westward expansion to reach it. Soon, the N&W was also shipping from its own new coal piers on Hampton Roads at Lamberts Point outside Norfolk. In 1889, in the southern part of the state, along the Norfolk and Western rail lines, the important coal center of Bluefield, West Virginia was founded. The "capital" of the Pocahontas coalfield, this city was the largest city in the southern portion of the state for several decades.

==== Other railroads ====
In the northern portion of the state and elsewhere, the older Baltimore and Ohio Railroad (B&O) and other lines also expanded to take advantage of coal opportunities as well. The B&O developed coal piers in Baltimore and at several points on the Great Lakes. Other significant rail carriers of coal were the Western Maryland Railway (WM), particularly notable was a latecomer, the Virginian Railway (VGN), built in an extraordinary manner to the latest and highest standards and completed in 1909.

=== Mining ===
The new state benefited from development of its mineral resources more than any other single economic activity after 1873. In the East, only Pennsylvania did more mining.

==== Coal ====
In the 1850s, geologists such as British expert Dr. David T. Ansted (1814–1880), surveyed potential coal fields. After the war, with the new railroads came a practical method to transport large quantities of coal to expanding U.S. and export markets. The actual mining was handled by a large number of small companies, funded by loans from local small banks. These small operations were too weak to challenge the railroads which controlled the local economies, nor the labor unions which demanded higher wages.

In 1917 there were 583,000 coal miners in the U.S. Leading the way Pennsylvania had 174,000; West Virginia was second at 88,422, and Illinois third at 88,090. Wages in West Virginia mines were about 5% higher than the national average, and because of wartime inflation about 68% higher than in 1902. Employment in coal mining declined sharply from a peak of 130,000 in 1940, although output has gone up. In the 1970s, 45,000 miners worked in 1,350 mines operated by 900 separate companies. They were located in 36 of the state's 55 counties.

By 2024 there were only 10,400 underground miners still at work in West Virginia. Large scale mechanization enabled the shift from underground to surface mining, which is much safer for the workers. Mountaintop removal mining (MTR) is a favorite method where the entire top of a mountain is bulldozed to access underlying coal seams by giant shovels filling huge trucks. The overburden is then placed in adjacent valleys, creating "valley fills" above ground.

==== Building the "Billion Dollar Coalfield" ====
The most remote and rugged area of the state was the mountainous region along the Kentucky border. Suddenly the geologists found Large deposits of bituminous coal, than in high demand to replace the more expensive anthracite. The population of the subregion quadrupled between 1890 and 1920; growth rates the main coal-field counties of Logan County, McDowell County, and Mingo County were twice as high. Within this area lay the Winding Gulf Coalfield, later promoted as the "Billion Dollar Coalfield." A protégé of Dr. Ansted was William Nelson Page (1854–1932), a civil engineer and mining manager based at Ansted in Fayette County. Beginning in 1898, Page teamed with northern and European-based investors to take advantage of the undeveloped area. They acquired large tracts of land in the area, and Page began the Deepwater Railway, a short-line railroad stretching between the C&O along the Kanawha River and the N&W at Matoaka, a distance of about 80 miles (130 km). However, two the large railroads did not appreciate the scheme and sought to discourage competition in an area they considered their own. However, Page had access to national money. One of his silent partner was millionaire industrialist Henry Huttleston Rogers, a principal in John D. Rockefeller's Standard Oil Trust and an old hand at developing natural resources. Instead of giving up, Page and Rogers secretly planned a route to provide a new, third major railroad, all the way to new coal pier facilities at Sewell's Point on the harbor of Hampton Roads, fully 440 miles (710 km) away from the railhead on the Kanawha River. In early 1904, they set up the Tidewater Railway, and in 1907 they formed the Virginian Railway (VGN). Building the Virginian Railway cost $40 million by the time it was completed in 1909. Well-engineered and highly efficient with all new infrastructure, it operated very profitably and came to be known as the "Richest Little Railroad in the World." Soon it and the C&O and N&W were shipping ever-increasing volumes of coal to export to Europe. The VGN and the N&W ultimately became parts of the modern Norfolk Southern system, and the VGN's well-engineered 20th-century tracks continue to offer a favorable gradient to Hampton Roads.

==== Accidents in coal mines ====
The Monongah mining disaster, on December 6, 1907, in West Virginia, was the worst coal mine explosion in American history. The official death toll stands at 362; half were Italian immigrants. Paul Rakes found many small episodes in which one or two miners lost their lives. Mine accidents were considered inevitable, and mine safety did not appreciably improve the situation because of lax enforcement. West Virginia's mines were considered so unsafe that immigration officials would not recommend them as a source of employment for immigrants, and those unskilled immigrants who did work in the coal mines were more susceptible to death or injury. When the United States Bureau of Mines was given more authority to regulate mine safety in the 1960s, safety awareness improved, and West Virginia coal mines became less dangerous.

==== Salt ====
Much of the northern panhandle and north-central portion of the state are underlain by bedded salt deposits over 50 feet (15 m) thick. Salt mining had been underway since the 18th century, though that which could be easily obtained had largely played out by the time of the Civil War, when the red salt of Kanawha County was a valued commodity of first Confederate, and later Union forces. Newer technology has since proved that West Virginia has enough salt resources to supply the nation's needs for 2,000 years. During recent years, production has been about 600,000 to 1,000,000 tons per year.

==== Timber ====
West Virginia was heavily forested. During 1870–1920 most of the old-growth forest was logged. Logging was supported by a dense rail network extending throughout the mountains and hollows. Small pockets of virgin forest remain at Gaudineer Scenic Area and Cathedral State Park.

=== Labor and environmental issues ===
As coal mining and related work became a major employment activities in the state, there was considerable labor strife as working conditions and safety issues, as well as economic ones arose. Even in the 21st century, mining safety and ecological concerns are challenging to the state whose coal continues to power electrical generating plants in many other states.

== 20th century ==
=== Progressive movement ===
Like every state West Virginia had a progressive movement in the early 20th century, inspired by middle class ideals regarding opposition to corruption and support for efficiency. Progressives pushed for modernization of the state's political institutions. Administration reforms helped curb the influence of industrial tycoons on politics and society. The influence of Progressive ideals led to significant legislative changes, especially during the tenure of two Republican governors, William Ellsworth Glasscock (1909–1913) and Henry D. Hatfield (1913–1917). They led the way to bring the state in line with other states in terms of the volume and scope of progressive legislation. There were successful popular demands for women's suffrage, for prohibition, and for improved public schools. The state government also raised taxes and upgraded agencies with an emphasis on efficiency and expertise, including road construction, a new tuberculosis sanitarium, and the office of Commissioner of Agriculture.

=== Woman suffrage ===
West Virginia suffragists worked at supporting the agendas put forward by the National American Woman Suffrage Association, the National Association of Colored Women and the Woman's Christian Temperance Union in the 1890s through the early part of the 20th century. According to historian Anne Wallace Effland, conservative social and religious beliefs together with the campaigns by anti-suffragists kept up a solid defense against them. The organized work by women's clubs during World War I helped convince legislators of their role in getting their women enfranchised. After a failed attempt to include woman suffrage as a state constitutional amendment in 1916, pro-suffrage Governor John J. Cornwell included the ratification of the federal amendment for woman suffrage in the agenda for a special legislative session in February 1920. The West Virginia Equal Suffrage Association under the leadership of President Mrs. John L. Ruhl and WVESA Ratification Committee chair Lenna Lowe Yost created a "living petition" of suffragists who greeted and personally lobbied each legislator as they prepared to vote. This strategy was a success, and West Virginia became the 34th of the 36 states needed to ratify the Nineteenth Amendment to the United States Constitution.

=== Mine wars ===
The West Virginia Mine Wars were a series of violent labor disputes from 1912 to 1921. The miners demanded the right to unionize in the United Mine Workers of America for better working conditions and pay; the many small local coal companies fiercely resisted these efforts. In remote mining camps the companies exerted control over nearly all aspects of miners' lives, including the company towns where they lived, the stores where they were forced to shop using company scrip, and even the law enforcement, which was often composed of hired private guards. About 35,000 strikers were evicted and they and their families moved to new camps run by the union. Socialists brought in weapons but in September 1912 the state sent in the National Guard to disarm the miners. On May 19, 1920, a shootout in took place in Matewan in the Battle of Blair Mountain. Finally in 1921 Governor Ephraim F. Morgan requested federal troops and President Warren G. Harding sent in 2500 Army soldiers. The strike was broken. The state government prosecuted several hundred of the leaders before local juries, but nearly all of them were acquitted. The federal government refused to prosecute anyone.

=== Wildlife conservation ===
Wildlife biologist Robert Silvester of the State Wildlife Center wrote a history of conservation in West Virginia. He explains as industry developed in the region, the people of West Virginia saw a need for wildlife conservation. The Wildlife and Fish Commission was created in 1921. The commission established the French Creek Game Farm in 1923. Various game animals and now protected birds were raised for conservation repopulating or control reasons throughout the state. Coincidentally, it was similar to an indigenous species open zoo of today and became a place of family outings visitation. The following years saw a significant growth of visitors. Buffalo were included in 1954 and attracted additional visitors. Today, the zoological facility is of 338-acre (1.37 km^{2}) modern Wildlife Center under the direction of the Division of Natural Resources.

=== Great Depression and New Deal ===
The Great Depression of 1929-1939 was very harsh everywhere in the state. According to James S. Olson, Between 1929 and 1932, the state's industrial economy suffered a major collapse. Production in the state's key industries plummeted. Many mines simply closed down. Coal production fell by over 40% between 1927 and 1932, dropping from 145.1 million tons to 83.3 million tons. Similarly, petroleum output declined from 5.7 million barrels in 1928 to 3.9 million barrels by 1932. Besides industry, there were heavy losses in all other sectors, especially farming. Corn production fell from 13.9 million bushels to 11.2 million bushels. At a time people needed cheap food, potato production fell in half, dropping from 6.6 million bushels to 3.6 million bushels. Tobacco output saw the most dramatic decline, plummeting from 6.6 million pounds to only 2.1 million pounds. Not only did the volume of output go down, the price per pound also fell sharply, which meant that farmers and producers had a hard time paying off old debts with less money. Bankruptcies and mortgage foreclosures were frequent. The number of banks plunged, from 310 to 210, with deposits falling by more than a third—from $328 million to $213 million. Many small banks that had invested in real estate were insolvent and had to close permanently. The depositors could not get any funds back for months; finally they received on average about 80% of their money back. Businesses of all sorts cut back and stopped hiring. Youths and unemployed men over age 45 seldom were hired. Unemployment soared, reaching over 25% in cities and even more in mining towns. Statewide, about 45% of families were destitute and urgently needed help.

Local charities were never well organized in prosperous times, and now the demands were overwhelming. They narrowed their efforts to setting up soup kitchens, which gave out free meals every day. The migration in the 1920s that brought so many farmers and rural folk to the cities suddenly reversed itself. Unemployment made the cities unattractive, and the network of kinfolk and more ample food supplies made it wise for many to go back. Neighbors helped, and extended families shared among themselves. Some older boys became hoboes so their younger siblings would have more food. Families crowded together and made do. Men-as-beadwinners felt more and more helpless, while women played an even larger nurturing role.

==== New Deal in politics ====
The failure of the Presidency of Herbert Hoover to deal with the cascading crisis about a political upheaval in West Virginia, effectively ending a long era of Republican political domination. In 1932, voters decisively approved a tax-limitation amendment and overwhelmingly supported the Democratic ticket, led by Franklin D. Roosevelt for president and Herman Kump for governor., ], while also passing a tax-limitation measure that blocked an expansion of state spending. This shift led to Democratic control of both the state legislature and the governor's office, establishing it as the dominant political party in West Virginia through the early 2000s. However, there was an ideological. tension in the Democratic Party. Kump was a fiscal conservative, who feared that generous relief payments would undermine the work ethic of the recipients. The Kump's solution was to reduce spending and impose the state's first sales taxes and income taxes. Kump's top advisor Homer A. Holt was elected governor in 1936. He was another conservative Democrat who feuded with the UMW and compared John L Lewis to Hiter. Harry Hopkins, Harold Ickes and the other top New Dealers were liberals who aggressively established programs all over West Virginia to hire tens of thousands of men (and some women and teenage boys) to relieve unemployment, poverty, and general backwardness. Washington worked around Kump and Holt and decided what West Virginia needed, with funding largely by deficit spending. Roosevelt's people rebuilt the defunct labor unions, especially the United Mine Workers, which now became a powerful grassroots liberal voting block.

==== New Deal work programs ====
The New Deal had several major work programs that reached hundreds of thousands of poor people in West Virginia. The main goal was to provide income for people who were unemployed and on local relief by giving them not cash handouts but actual jobs. The secondary goal was to rebuild the state's infrastructure of public buildings, roads, sidewalks, sewers, stadiums, school buildings, airports, parks, and forests. Republican critics complained that the true goal was to forge a nationwide Democratic Party majority. Three early ones were the Federal Emergency Relief Administration (FERA, 1933–1935), the Civil Works Administration (CWA, 1933–1935) and the Civilian Conservation Corps (CCC, 1933–1942). The largest and most important was the Works Progress Administration (WPA, 1935–1943). They each included segregated units for women and Blacks. The Public Works Administration (PWA, 1933–1944) did not hire workers; instead it gave construction contracts to private companies. The CCC by far was the most popular with the media and general public and escaped political attack from conservatives. All were shut down when the unemployment problem ended in World War II. Jobs were not the solution for the elderly poor. They given monthly cash by the "Old Age Assistance" program that was part of the new Social Security system in 1935.

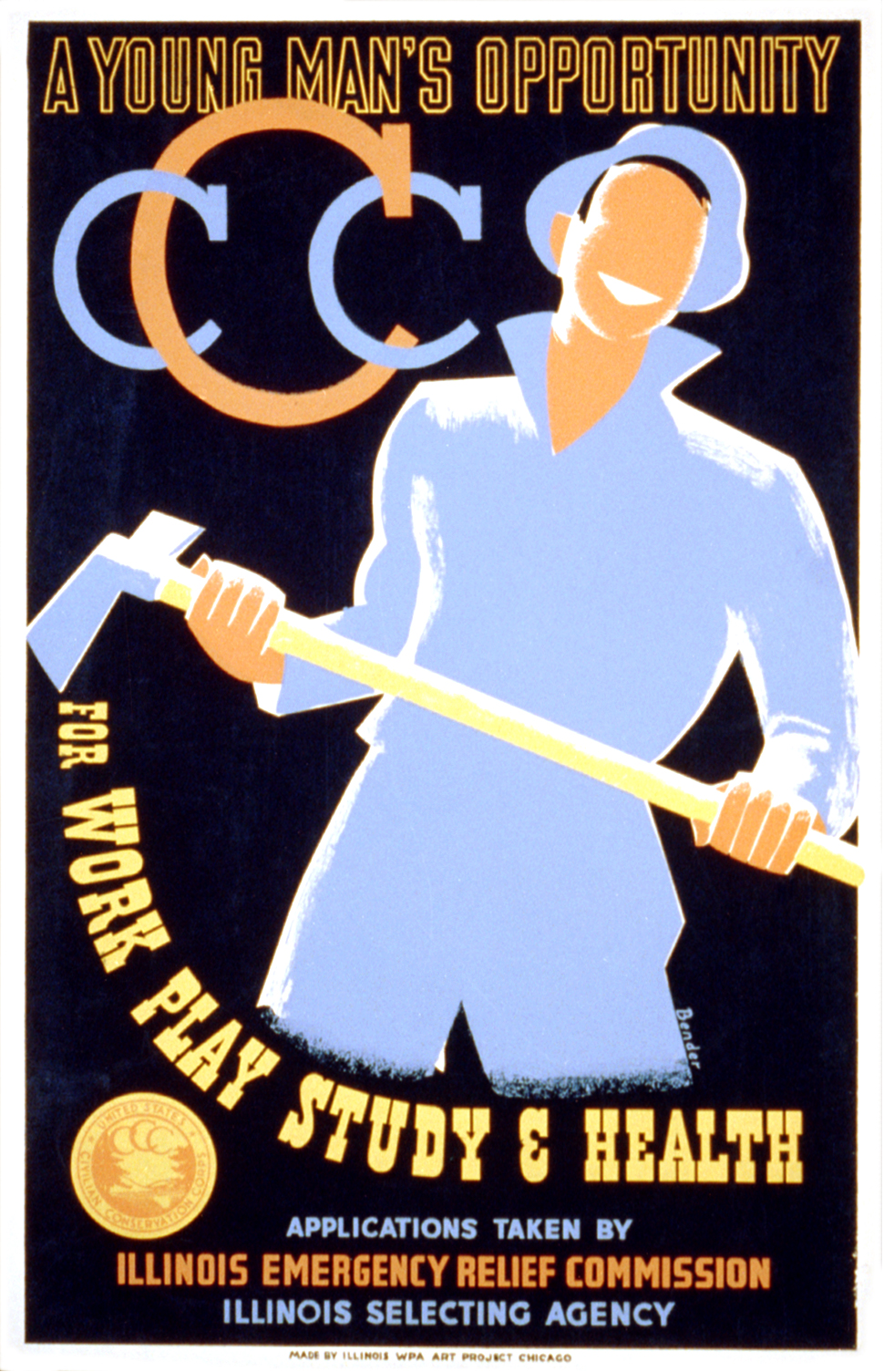
Poster by Albert M. Bender, produced by the Illinois WPA Art Project Chicago in 1935 for the CCC

===== Civilian Conservation Corps =====
The most popular of all the New Deal programs was the Civilian Conservation Corps. It enrolled 55,000 poor unemployed young men age 18 to 25 recruited from families on relief in West Virginia. They spent six months or a year in 65 rural camps, for example in Cabwaylingo State Forest. They built numerous state parks, bridges, lodges, and lakes that remain in use today. They also constructed roads and trails, engaged in extensive reforestation efforts, and provided emergency forest fire protection. The enrollees were given plenty of food and clothing. CCC hired local doctors and dentists to provide care. The youth were paid $30 per month. They had $5 for spending money and $25 was sent to their families. The camps were racially segregated. To gain labor union support, the CCC did not provide training in unionized occupations; however many learned cooking and restaurant skills. CCC camps were directed by U.S. Army Reserve officers, but there were no military uniforms or drills. No gangs, guns, drugs, alcohol, girls or violence was tolerated.

==== Revival of United Mine workers under John L. Lewis ====
The 1930s were a pivotal decade for the United Mine Workers of America (UMWA). As the economy recovered, employment in the coal mines was restored. President Roosevelt and the Democrats in Congress secured legislation in the National Industrial Recovery Act (NIRA) in 1933 and the National Labor Relations Act (Wagner Act in 1935). The laws were major catalysts that enabled all labor unions to recover by enrolling semi-skilled factory workers. Eagerly they joined the New Deal coalition and helped produce Roosevelt's landlside reelection in 1936. John L. Lewis not only ran the UMW with an iron fist, he moved out to set up powerful new unions in steel, automobiles and other industries. Lewis was a key ally of Roosevelt in 1933 to 1936.

=== World War II ===
West Virginia enthusiastically supported World War II, with 67,000 men and about 1,000 women donning uniforms. Unemployment ended as the mines, railroads, mills and factories worked overtime to create the "Arsenal of Democracy" that supplied the munitions to win the war. However, repeatedly John L. Lewis called his United Mine Workers union out on strike, defying the government, outraging public opinion, and strengthening the hand of anti-union Congressmen. In the postwar years, he continued his militancy; his miners went on strikes or "work stoppages" annually.

Women volunteered for farm and home economics training programs, United Service Organizations (USO) clubs that provided entertainment and assistance to servicemen, salvage campaigns to produce steel scrap, and civil defense training that taught first aid and emergency response techniques. Middle-class women made up the majority of volunteers; many programs were not open to African American and lower-class white women. Some West Virginia women also volunteered for military service, which was available to African American women. In spite of sexism, racism, and class distinctions that women faced in volunteering, thousands responded to the national war effort.

=== School integration ===
The response in West Virginia to the 1954 Brown v. Board of Education Supreme Court decision outlawing segregated schools was generally positive, as Governor William C. Marland pledged to integrate the state's schools. The state's integration experiences were generally peaceful, swift and cooperative.

=== Vietnam War ===
During the Vietnam War a total of 36,578 West Virginians served, with most beginning as teenagers. As the war went on, many citizens began to turn against the conflict. 711 of the state's citizens died during the war. Nine West Virginians were awarded the Medal of Honor during Vietnam.

== See also ==
- History of Appalachia
- History of the Upland South
- Education in West Virginia
- Former counties, cities, and towns of Virginia
- West Virginia State Museum
- Wheeling Convention
- List of Registered Historic Places in West Virginia
- Charles Henry Ambler – Preeminent historian of West Virginia history

== References and bibliography ==
=== Surveys ===
- Abramson, Rudy, and Jean Haskell, eds. Encyclopedia of Appalachia (2006) 1864pp; 2000 articles by experts; not online.
- Ambler, Charles H. and Festus P. Summers. West Virginia, the Mountain State (1958) a standard history
- Brisbin, Richard A. et al. West Virginia Politics and Government (1996)
- Callahan, James M. Semi-Centennial History of West Virginia (1913), online, old useful narrative
- Callahan, James Morton (1922). "West Virginia" . In Chisholm, Hugh (ed.). Encyclopædia Britannica. Vol. 32 (12th ed.). London & New York: The Encyclopædia Britannica Company.
- Callahan, James Morton. History of West Virginia (1923) 3 vol, with many biographies000
- Capace, Nancy. Encyclopedia of West Virginia (1999) online
- Chisholm, Hugh, ed. (1911). "West Virginia" . Encyclopædia Britannica. Vol. 28 (11th ed.). Cambridge University Press. pp. 560–564.
- Conley, Philip Mallory. The West Virginia Encyclopedia (1929). online
- Fast, Richard E. The history and government of West Virginia (1901) online edition, detailed political narrative to 1900
- Rice, Otis K. and Stephen W. Brown. West Virginia: A History, (2d ed. 1993), a standard history
- Sullivan, Ken, ed. the West Virginia encyclopedia (2006) 944pp. Paper version of major online resource. online
- Tyler, Lyon Gardiner. Encyclopedia of Virginia biography (1915) online.
- Williams, John Alexander. West Virginia: A History for Beginners. 2nd ed. Charleston, W.Va.: Appalachian Editions, 1997.
- Williams, John Alexander. West Virginia: A Bicentennial History (1976)
- Williams, John Alexander. Appalachia: A History (2002) online
- WPA. West Virginia; a guide to the mountain state (1941); The government jobs project that has comprehensive in-depth coverage of every locality and most major topics; well illustrated; can be downloaded. online

=== Pre 1877 ===
- Ambler, Charles H. Sectionalism in Virginia from 1776 to 1861 (1910) online
  - Rasmussen, Barbara. "Charles Ambler's Sectionalism in Virginia: An Appreciation," West Virginia History, Spring 2009, Vol. 3 Issue 1, pp 1–35
- Ambler, Charles H. A History of Education in West Virginia From Early Colonial Times to 1949 (1951), 1000 pages
- Curry, Richard Orr. A House Divided: A Study of Statehood Politics and Copperhead Movement in West Virginia (1964)
- Curry, Richard Orr. "A Reappraisal of Statehood Politics in West Virginia", Journal of Southern History 28 (November 1962): 403–21. in JSTOR
- Curry, Richard Orr. "Crisis Politics in West Virginia, 1861–1870," in Richard O. Curry ed., Radicalism, Racism, and Party Realignment: The Border States During Reconstruction (1969)
- Engle, Stephen D. "Mountaineer Reconstruction: Blacks in the Political Reconstruction of West Virginia," Journal of Negro History, Vol. 78, No. 3 (Summer, 1993), pp. 137–165 in JSTOR
- Fredette, Allison. "The View from the Border: West Virginia Republicans and Women's Rights in the Age of Emancipation," West Virginia History, Spring2009, Vol. 3 Issue 1, pp 57–80, 1861–1870 era
- Gerofsky, Milton. "Reconstruction in West Virginia, Part I and II," West Virginia History 6 (July 1945); Part I, 295–360, 7 (October 1945): Part II, 5–39,
- Link, William A. "'This Bastard New Virginia': Slavery, West Virginia Exceptionalism, and the Secession Crisis," West Virginia History, Spring 2009, Vol. 3 Issue 1, pp 37–56
- McGregor, James C. The Disruption of Virginia. (1922) full text online
- MacKenzie, Scott A. The Fifth Border State: Slavery, Emancipation, and the Formation of West Virginia, 1829–1872 (West Virginia University Press, 2023) online book review
- Noe, Kenneth W. "Exterminating Savages: The Union Army and Mountain Guerrillas in Southern West Virginia, 1861–1865." In Noe and Shannon H. Wilson, Civil War in Appalachia (1997), 104–30.
- Rice, Otis K. The Allegheny Frontier: West Virginia Beginnings, 1730–1830 (1970),
- Riccards, Michael P. "Lincoln and the Political Question: The Creation of the State of West Virginia" Presidential Studies Quarterly, Vol. 27, 1997 online edition
- Shade, William G. Democratizing the Old Dominion: Virginia and the Second American Party System, 1824–1861. (1996).
- Stealey III, John E. "The Freedmen's Bureau in West Virginia," West Virginia History 39 (January/April 1978): 99–142
- Zimring, David R. "'Secession in Favor of the Constitution': How West Virginia Justified Separate Statehood during the Civil War." West Virginia History 3.2 (2009): 23–51. online

=== Since 1877 ===
- Ambler, Charles H. A History of Education in West Virginia From Early Colonial Times to 1949 (1951), 1000 pages online
- Bailey, Rebecca J., Matewan before the Massacre: Politics, Coal, and the Roots of Conflict in a West Virginia Mining Community (West Virginia University Press, 2008)
- Becker, Jane S. Inventing Tradition: Appalachia and the Construction of an American Folk, 1930–1940 (1998).
- Campbell, John C. The Southern Highlander and His Homeland (1921) reissued 1969. online edition
- Corbin, David Alan. Life, Work, and Rebellion in the Coal Fields: The Southern West Virginia Miners, 1880–1922 (1981)
- Conley, Phil. History of West Virginia Coal Industry (Charleston: Education Foundation, 1960)
- Cook, Samuel R. "The Great Depression, Subsistence, and Views of Poverty in Wyoming County, West Virginia" Journal of Appalachian Studies 4#2 (1998), pp. 271–283
- Corbin, David Alan. "Betrayal in the West Virginia Coal Fields: Eugene V. Debs and the Socialist Party of America, 1912–1914," Journal of American History, 64#4 (1978), pp. 987–1009 in JSTOR
- Davis, Donald Edward. Where There Are Mountains: An Environmental History of the Southern Appalachians 2000.
- Dix, Keith. What's a Coal Miner to Do? The Mechanization of Coal Mining (1988), changes in the coal industry prior to 1940.
- Duafala, A. P. “The Historiography of the West Virginia Mine Wars.” West Virginia History 12# 1/2, (2018), pp. 71–90. online
- Edwards, Pamela. "West Virginia Women in World War II: The Role of Gender, Class, and Race in Shaping Wartime Volunteer Efforts," West Virginia History, Spring 2008, Vol. 2 Issue 1, pp 27–57
- Eller, Ronald D. Uneven Ground: Appalachia Since 1945 (2009)
- Eller, Ronald D. Miners, Millhands, and Mountaineers: Industrialization of the Appalachian South, 1880–1930 (1982).
- Feather, Carl E. Mountain People in a Flat Land: A Popular History of Appalachian Migration to Northeast Ohio, 1940–1965. (1998).
- Ford, Thomas R. ed. The Southern Appalachian Region: A Survey. (1967), includes highly detailed statistics.
- Kenna, John Edward (1889). "West Virginia" . In Baynes, T. S.; Smith, W. R. (eds.). Encyclopædia Britannica. Vol. 24 (9th ed.). New York: Charles Scribner's Sons.
- Kephart, Horace. Our Southern Highlanders. (1922). Reprinted as Our Southern Highlanders: A Narrative of Adventure in the Southern Appalachians and a Study of Life among the Mountaineers. With an Introduction by George Ellison. Knoxville: University of Tennessee Press, 1976. full text online
- Lewis, Ronald L. Transforming the Appalachian Countryside: Railroads, Deforestation, and Social Change in West Virginia, 1880–1920 (1998) online
- Lewis, Ronald L. Black Coal Miners in America: Race, Class, and Community Conflict (1987).
- Lewis, Ronald L. Welsh Americans: A History of Assimilation in the Coalfields (2008)
- Lunt, Richard D. Law and Order vs. the Miners: West Virginia, 1907–1933 (1979), On labor conflicts of the early 20th century.
- McAteer, Davitt. Monongah: The Tragic Story of the 1907 Monongah Mine Disaster, the Worst Industrial Accident in US History (2007),
- Milnes, Gerald. Play of a Fiddle: Traditional Music, Dance, and Folklore in West Virginia. (1999).
- Olson, James S. "The Depths of the Great Depression: Economic Collapse in West Virginia, 1932-1933." West Virginia History (Apr. 1977) v 38 pp. 214–225.
- Pudup, Mary Beth, Dwight B. Billings, and Altina L. Waller, eds. Appalachia in the Making: The Mountain South in the Nineteenth Century. (1995).
- Rice, Otis K.; Brown, Stephen W. (1994). West Virginia: A History. Lexington, KY: University Press of Kentucky. ISBN 978-0813118543.
- Rottenberg, Don. In the Kingdom of Coal: An American Family and the Rock That Changed the World (2003), owners' perspective online edition online
- Seltzer, Curtis. Fire in the Hole: Miners and Managers in the American Coal Industry (1985), conflict in the coal industry to the 1980s.
- Summers, Festus P. William L. Wilson and Tariff Reform, a Biography (1953)
- Tams, W.P. Jr., The Smokeless Coal Fields of West Virginia (2nd ed. 2001) p. 25. online
- Taylor, John Craft. " Depression and New Deal in Pendleton: A History of a West Virginia County from the Great Crash to Pearl Harbor. 1929–1941" (PhD dissertation, Pennsylvania State University; ProQuest Dissertations & Theses, 1980. 8024498) Online at academic libraries..
- Thomas, Jerry Bruce. An Appalachian New Deal: West Virginia in the Great Depression (West Virginia University Press, 1998) 316 pp. ISBN 978-1-933202-51-8 online
- Thomas, Jerry Bruce. "The Great Depression." in e-WV: The WestVirginia Encyclopedia (2004) online
- Thomas, Jerry Bruce. An Appalachian Reawakening: West Virginia and the Perils of the New Machine Age, 1945-1972 (West Virginia University Press, 2011) online
- Trotter Jr., Joe William. Coal, Class, and Color: Blacks in Southern West Virginia, 1915–32 (1990)
- Williams, John Alexander. West Virginia and the Captains of Industry (1976), economic history of late 19th century.
- Williams, John Alexander (2013) [1984]. West Virginia: A History. New York: W. W. Norton & Company. ASIN B00FAD73U2.

=== Primary sources ===
- Cometti, Elizabeth, and Festus P. Summers, eds. The Thirty-fifth State: A Documentary History of West Virginia. Morgantown: West Virginia University Library, 1966.
- Corbin, David Alan, ed., The West Virginia Mine Wars: An Anthology (Appalachian Editions, 1990), ISBN 0962748609
- Lewis, Ronald I., ed. West Virginia : documents in the history of a rural-industrial state (1996) online
