= Flick Amendment =

The Flick Amendment was an 1871 Republican-initiated amendment to the West Virginia State Constitution that restored state rights to former Confederates and African-Americans who had been barred from voting and holding office in West Virginia following the American Civil War.

In the years following the Civil War, the West Virginia legislature was dominated by the Radical Republicans. By 1869, Liberal Republicans were being elected to the legislature in significant numbers. The amendment, named for William H.H. Flick, a newly elected Liberal Republican, was intended to limit the growth of the Democratic Party in the legislature by appealing to African-Americans and conservative-leaning Democrats.

The amendment, however, had unintentional consequences for the Republican party. The Fifteenth Amendment to the United States Constitution, which granted in 1870 the right to vote regardless of skin color, had been ratified more quickly than proponents of the Flick Amendment had anticipated, nullifying its appeal to African-Americans.

The Flick Amendment was ratified by voters on April 17, 1871, and its provisions were incorporated into the West Virginia Constitution of 1872. Republicans had hoped the amendment would unite the Republicans and fragment the Democratic Party. The opposite occurred, however, and the newly enfranchised Democratic Party—propelled by reinstated ex-Confederate voters, dominated state politics for the next quarter-century.
