= Constitution of West Virginia =

American state constitution

The Great Seal of the State of West Virginia

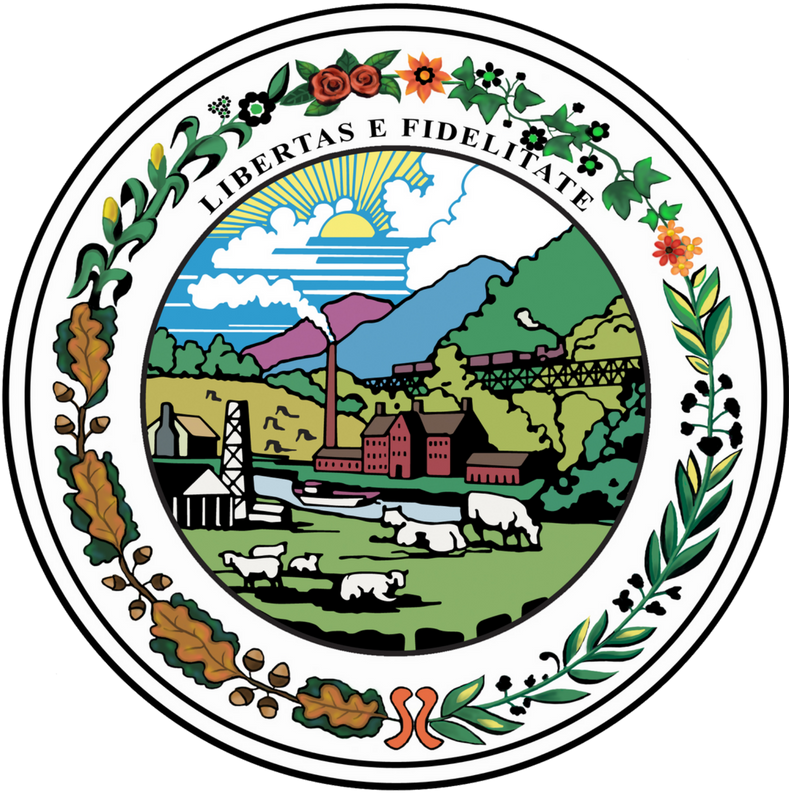
The Great Seal of the State of West Virginia reverse

The Constitution of the State of West Virginia is the supreme law of the U.S. state of West Virginia. It expresses the rights of the state's citizens and provides the framework for the organization of law and government. West Virginia is governed under its second and current constitution, which dates from 1872. The document includes fourteen articles and several amendments.

== History ==
The first constitution for the state was written in 1861. Following the secession of Virginia during the American Civil War, Unionist politicians established a "Restored Government" to assert their loyalty to the U.S. In November of that year, delegates from the state's westernmost counties met in convention at Wheeling to form a new state, dubbed West Virginia, and wrote a constitution for that state. In the midst of the war, slavery proved to be one of the main issues at the convention, but delegates sidestepped the question of emancipation and merely prohibited enslaved persons and free persons of color from entering the state. Congress, however, required the state to adopt a policy of gradual emancipation, and with that amendment made, admitted the state into the Union. Significantly, the state's first constitution also abandoned the traditional system of county government found in Virginia and elsewhere in the South. Instead, the drafters of the 1863 document "Yankeefied" the state's local government, establishing a system of townships which resembled that found in New England. In 1869, the Flick Amendment created universal manhood suffrage within the state.

Two years later, the state legislature called for a convention to draft a new constitution, which commenced in 1872. The convention made a number of changes to the preexisting document, including increasing the terms of office for the governor and legislators. As historian Sean Patrick Adams notes, the Flick Amendment empowered conservatives, including former Confederates, who dominated the convention. These conservatives admired the government of Virginia, and the 1872 constitution resembled the 1850 constitution of that state in many ways. County courts became the center of governmental authority, decentralizing the state, and a system of business taxation was also implemented. As of 1995, this document has been amended 66 times, with an additional 46 proposals having been rejected. The majority of amendments proposed since 1960 have been ratified.

== Current constitution (1872) ==
=== Preamble ===
The preamble was added to the constitution in 1960 by referendum.

Since through Divine Providence we enjoy the blessings of civil, political and religious liberty, we, the people of West Virginia, in and through the provisions of this Constitution, reaffirm our faith in and constant reliance upon God and seek diligently to promote, preserve and perpetuate good government in the State of West Virginia for the common welfare, freedom and security of ourselves and our posterity.

— Constitution of West Virginia, Preamble

=== Article I. Relations to the US Government ===
Article I defines the state in relation to the federal government. It acknowledges the supremacy of the U.S. Constitution and declares that the state constitution is set out according to the principle that powers not enumerated for the federal government are reserved to the states. This article originated with the 1863 Constitution, reflecting the fact that the state was born out of the Civil War.

=== Article II. The State ===
Article II defines the boundaries of the state as laid out in 1872.

Article II sets out the state's boundaries and defines the rights of citizens. It also deals with issues such as treason, the state seal, and the wording of various legal documents. Due to its origins as a split from the state of Virginia, the eastern boundary laid out in Article II was disputed by the latter state. The boundary claimed by West Virginia was eventually recognized by the U.S. Supreme Court in 1871 with the case Virginia v. West Virginia.

=== Article III. Bill of Rights ===
Article III sets out the rights of the state's citizens. Many of the rights found in Article III are also found in the federal Bill of Rights. As a former part of Virginia, that state's Bill of Rights also influenced West Virginia's. The state's bill of rights also contains some provisions not found in either of its antecedents. These include a prohibition on "political tests" such as religious tests or loyalty oaths. This provision arose following the Civil War and was added at the insistence of former Confederates who had been disfranchised following the war. Another provision guarantees students the right to pray in a school but does not mandate school prayer. A federal district court partially struck the section down, saying it violated the Establishment Clause, but the remainder of the provision remains in effect.

=== Article IV. Election & Officers ===
Article IV governs state elections and eligibility to hold office. Provisions include eligibility for voting, methods for impeaching or otherwise removing officials, and a guaranteed secret ballot.

=== Article V. Division of Powers ===
Article V consists of a single section:

The legislative, executive and judicial departments shall be separate and distinct, so that neither shall exercise the power properly belonging to either of the others; nor shall any person exercise the powers of more than one of them at the same time, except that justices of the peace shall be eligible to the Legislature.

— Constitution of West Virginia, Article V

=== Article VI. The Legislature ===
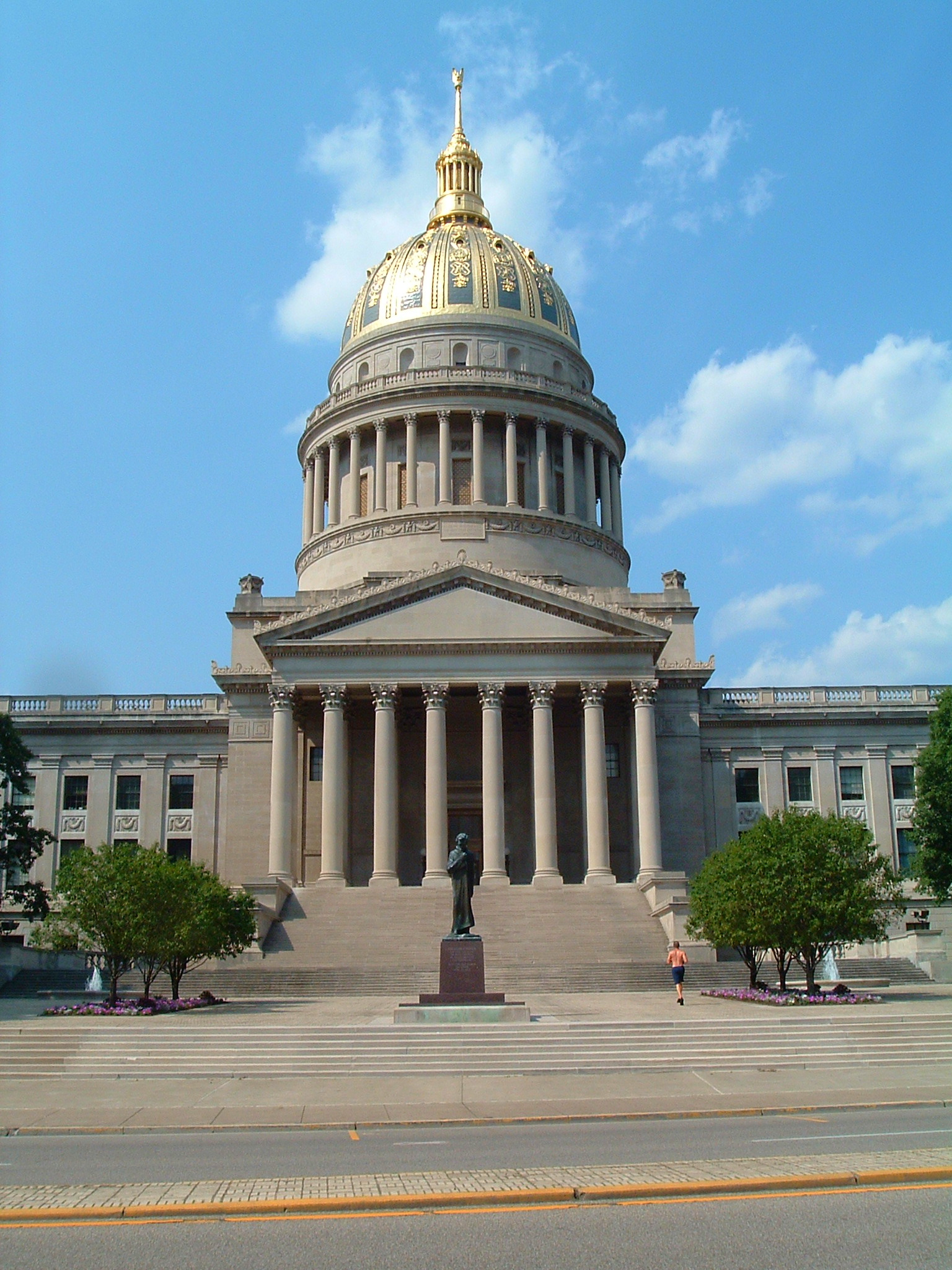
The West Virginia Legislature meets in the state capitol building in Charleston

Article VI concerns the state's legislature. The article comprises three main parts: sections 2-15 deal with the legislature's composition, sections 16-34 provide legislative rules, and sections 35-54 set out the legislature's powers. Other provisions include a procedure for adding additional territory to the state (section 11). This section initially appeared in the 1863 Constitution. While never invoked under the 1872 Constitution, the legislature did utilize this provision in 1863 to add Berkeley and Jefferson Counties to the state following their ratification of the 1863 Constitution in November 1863 after the remainder of the state had done so in March of that year. (West Virginia officially became a state in June 1863). Amendments to this article permitted the creation of the state lottery (section 36), granted the legislature power over the state's forests (section 53), and provide for the continuity of government (section 54).

=== Article VII. Executive Department ===
Article VII details the executive branch of the state government. Most of the article concerns the powers of the state governor. Other officers in this branch include the secretary of state, auditor, treasurer, agriculture commissioner, and attorney general. (The agriculture commissioner was added in 1934, while a 1957 amendment removed the state superintendent of schools). On the other hand, West Virginia is one of the few states without an official lieutenant governor, and amendments to add such a position have repeatedly failed, most recently in 2012. Instead, the president of the state senate succeeds as acting governor in the event of a vacancy. West Virginia law therefore permits that person to unofficially use the title of "Governor."

=== Article VIII. Judicial Power ===
Article VIII covers the judicial branch of the state government. The only courts established by this article are the state supreme court, circuit courts, and magistrate courts. Additionally, the legislature has the ability to create various other appellate courts but thus far has not done so. The 1863 constitution used a system of townships to organize the judicial branch below the supreme court, but the original 1872 constitution replaced this township system with a reliance on county courts in addition to the supreme and circuit courts. These courts lost most of their judicial power in 1880 but were not formally abolished until 1974, when the present version of Article VIII was enacted. (At that time, the county courts became county commissions). Additionally, the 1974 amendments replaced justices of the peace with magistrates. Section 11 also authorizes the creation of municipal courts.

=== Article IX. County Organization ===
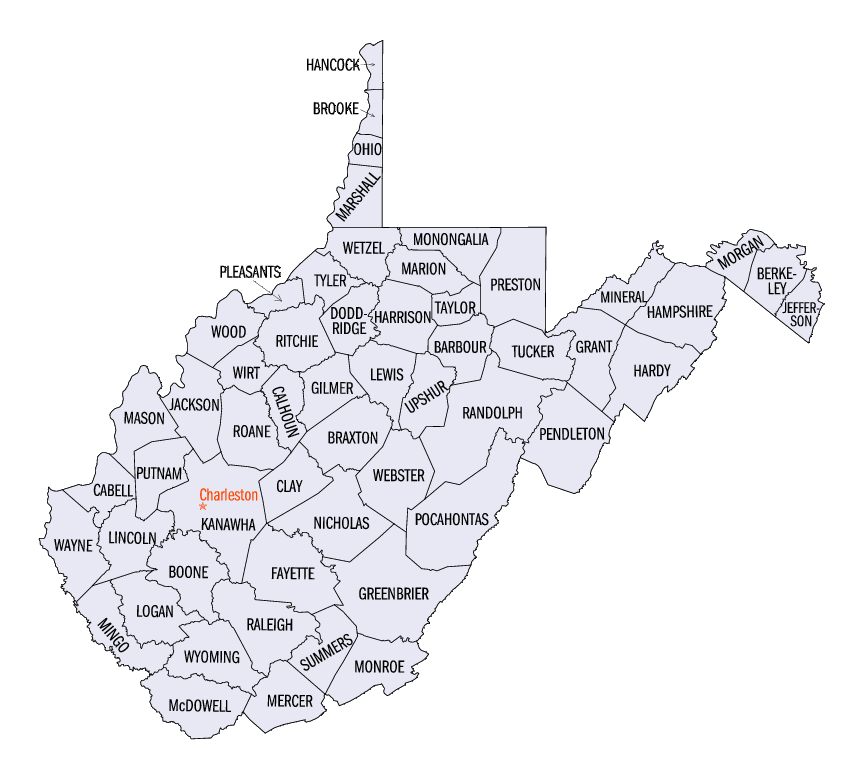
Map of the state's counties

Article IX deals with the state's 55 counties. It establishes various elected offices, including sheriffs, prosecuting attorneys, and the county commissions. Section 2 additionally provides for the appointment of officials such as coroners and overseers of the poor, although most counties no longer have such positions.

=== Article X. Taxation & Finance ===
Article X lays the foundation for the state's revenues and expenditures. The main taxes authorized by this section are property taxes and income tax, although the legislature has the power to levy additional taxes (section 5). Much of this section deals with financing education, and the state supreme court has limited the legislature's discretion in funding education as a result. Section 10, however, permits local school boards to increase taxation in order to properly fund schools.

=== Article XI. Corporations ===
Article XI governs the legislature's ability to create and regulate corporations. Most notably, the legislature cannot create corporations through special laws but must rely on general laws applying to all corporations. This provision arose in response to the practices in the state of Virginia, where powerful corporations influenced state legislators to pass laws granting them special treatment. Many of the provisions deal with the regulation of railroads.

=== Article XII. Education ===
Article XII deals with the state's educational system. Because Virginia lacked a statewide system of public education, the drafters of the 1863 constitution made establishing such a system a high priority. The system is overseen by the state board of education, with various local school districts responsible for directly administering schools. Sections 6 and 10 regulate these districts, prohibiting the legislature from establishing additional ones and requiring geographical diversity among the members of local school boards. Initially, the 1872 Constitution prohibited whites and Blacks from being taught in the same public school. The prohibition did not apply to private schools, such as Storer College. Since the school year consisted of four months of 22 days each, in some towns the whites used the school from September through December, and Blacks from January through April.

=== Article XIII. Land Titles ===
Article XIII regulates land ownership within the state. This article arose in 1862 in response to various land disputes left unresolved by the state government of Virginia. State legislator Benjamin Harrison Smith drafted provisions which aimed to ease access to land titles by resident landowners vis-à-vis non-resident land speculators. Additionally, the sale of "forfeited and delinquent lands" provided funding for the state's nascent educational system, although not as much as drafters such as Gordon Battelle hoped. These provisions were unique to any state constitution. A 1992 amendment repealed most of this article, although sections 1 and 2 remain in force. Section 1 provides for the continuity of land ownership from Virginia, while section 2 abolished the system of land warrants. (Land warrants were documents issued by the state government authorizing the surveying and possession of undeveloped land).

=== Article XIV. Amendments ===
Article XIV provides two methods for amending the constitution: a constitutional convention (section 1) and legislative amendments (section 2). The former has only been used to enact the 1872 constitution.

=== Amendments ===
Fifteen amendments are attached to the end of the document. Two amendments, passed in 1902, revised the state's judicial system and educational funding system. The remaining thirteen authorize the issuance of various bonds.

== Bibliography ==
- Adams, Sean P. (2004). Old Dominion, Industrial Commonwealth: Coal, Politics, and Economy in Antebellum America. Baltimore: Johns Hopkins University Press. ISBN 0-8018-7968-X. OCLC 54349872.
- Bastress, Robert (2011) [1995]. The West Virginia Constitution: A Reference Guide. New York: Oxford University Press. ISBN 978-0-19-977870-6.
- Lewis, Virgil Anson (1889). A History of West Virginia: In Two Parts. Philadelphia: Hubbard Brothers.
- McCabe, Jr., Brooks F. (2012). "Benjamin Harrison Smith, Land Titles, and the West Virginia Constitution". West Virginia History: A Journal of Regional Studies. 6 (1): 1–34. doi:10.1353/wvh.2012.0011. S2CID 146148351.
