= J. McVicker Hunt =

- Born: March 19, 1906; Scottsbluff, Nebraska
- Died: January 9, 1991 (aged 84); Urbana, Illinois
- Other name: Joseph McVicker Hunt
- Education: University of Nebraska
- Occupation: Professor of psychology
- Spouse: Esther Dahms (1929–1991)
- Children: 2

Joseph McVicker Hunt (March 19, 1906 – January 9, 1991) was a prominent American educational psychologist and author. He promoted and researched concepts related to the malleable nature of child intelligence (also promulgated by Benjamin Bloom). That work eventually led to the theory of learning centered on the concept of the information processing system.

== Early life ==
Joseph McVicker Hunt was born in Nebraska on March 19, 1906, to parents R. Sanford and Carrie Pearl Hunt, who were both University of Nebraska graduates. Hunt was an active student with interests in both academic and nonacademic areas such as sports.

== Education ==
Hunt enrolled in the University of Nebraska in the mid-1920s. He became president of the League of Industrial Democracy and Student Christian Association as well as participating in football and wrestling. He was also a writer for a newspaper and sold life insurance while in school to earn extra money.

Hunt had difficulty deciding on an undergraduate major, so he started with biology, and then moved to philosophy, economics, and sociology. His interest in psychology did not begin until his junior year, when Joy Paul Guilford returned to the University of Nebraska to direct the psychology laboratory. Hunt took advice from one of his sociology professors and enrolled in a course taught by Guilford who eventually asked him to complete graduate work in psychology. Hunt accepted and became a graduate student in 1929 at the University of Nebraska.

Hunt was interested in psychoanalysis. For his master's thesis, Hunt wanted to discuss the personality traits of extraversion and introversion, which were described by William McDougal, but after reading the work of Sigmund Freud and Carl Jung, Hunt became convinced of the importance of early life experiences in shaping one's personality. Additionally, Hunt had the opportunity to test the intelligence of children at the Nebraska Home for Dependent Children, which proved to be important in his later work on the development of child intelligence.

Hunt completed his MA in 1930 and then became an assistant instructor at his alma mater for one year. Hunt then completed his doctoral degree at Cornell University under the supervision of Madison Bentley, who was a student of Edward Bradford Titchener. Hunt received a Ph.D. from Cornell University in 1933. Hunt also completed postdoctoral fellowships at the New York State Psychiatric Institute and the Worcester State Hospital. He also received a D.Sc. from Brown University.

== Teaching and research ==
As an assistant instructor at the University of Nebraska, Hunt directed the laboratory experiences for introductory psychology students and taught a course on psychological testing. He was asked to be an instructor of psychology at Brown University, which Hunt accepted in 1936. Hunt was a professor at Brown for 10 years and during this time researched experimental psychopathology and Freudian concepts in animals. This is also where he became familiar with the work of Jean Piaget.

A notable collaboration at Brown was with Harold Schlosberg, in which they attempted to induce neuroses in hoarding rats. They found that the rats that were given unlimited food supply did not hoard their food as adults, whereas the rats that were fed irregularly did hoard their food as adults. These findings implied the importance of early life experience in shaping adult behavior.

His latest job before his death was as professor of psychology at the University of Illinois in 1951. Before that he taught at a number of universities, including Brown University, Columbia University, the University of Nebraska, and New York University. At the University of Illinois, he started out being interested in the origin of human intelligence and its development. Although other research emphasized the genetic component of intelligence, Hunt thought that experience played just as large a role in the development of intelligence. Hunt was also interested in the neurophysiological basis of behavior and was impressed with Donald Hebb's assertions. Therefore, he developed the A/S ratio, which suggested that aspects of motivation were connected to the ratio of association areas to sensory areas in the brain. This idea led to the understanding of intrinsic motivation. His interest in Jean Piaget stemmed from his teaching infant development at the University of Illinois and challenged the nativist perspective that was dominant at the time on the development of intelligence. Grants from both the Russell Sage Foundation and the Commonwealth Fund allowed him to research the development of intelligence and motivation through child-rearing practices and experience. His work helped to develop different scales that were able to measure psychological development in young children.

== Notable works ==
Hunt contributed to the two-volume landmark publication entitled Personality and the Behavior Disorders, which was published in 1944 during his time at Brown. This work summarized work pertaining to mental disorders and personality and provided ideas for future research from both a psychodynamic and psychoanalytic perspective.

Hunt's book entitled Intelligence and Experience, written in 1961, was one of the most influential volumes on child development. It emphasized the shift that was happening among American psychologists regarding intelligence and what determines intelligence. Hunt claimed that experience played a much larger role in determining intelligence in adulthood.

== Other notable contributions ==
Joseph McVicker Hunt was elected and served as the American Psychological Association president from 1951 to 1952. He was also the editor of the Journal of Abnormal and Social Psychology from 1949 to 1955, was a member of the APA council of representatives and the president of the APA's Division of Clinical Psychology from 1967 to 1970. He also helped establish the American Psychological Foundation. Additionally, Hunt laid the groundwork for the Head Start Program in the early 1960s. He did this by emphasizing the importance of early education and developed psychometric methods that assessed cognitive developments in young children. Hunt also served as the leader of the White House Task Force on Early Childhood Development under President Lyndon B. Johnson, which is known for their report entitled "A Bill of Rights for Children."

== Awards and honors ==
Hunt received a number of awards, including the Award for Excellence in Research from the American Personal and Guidance Association and the Research Career Award from the National Institute of Mental Health. Hunt held a National Institute of Mental Health Research Career Award from 1962 to 1974, was awarded the Gold Medal of the American Psychological Association in 1970, received the Distinguished Contribution Award of APA developmental psychology division and the G. Stanley Hall Award from the clinical psychology division.

== Personal life ==
Hunt married Esther Dahms on December 5, 1929, and was married to her until her death in 1989. Hunt died on January 9, 1991, at home in Urbana, Illinois. He is survived by his two daughters Carol Epple and Judith Ann Hunt.

== Legacy ==
Hunt retired from the University of Illinois in 1974. However, he remained an active researcher. His most important contributions were those in developmental psychology. Through his research, Hunt was able to emphasize the malleable nature of a child and the role of experience in molding a person. Hunt published over 100 research and theoretical papers, and was editor of the Journal of Abnormal and Social Psychology from 1950 and 1955. He was also an editor and contributor for Personality and the Behavior Disorders.
