= 1896 United States presidential election in Indiana =

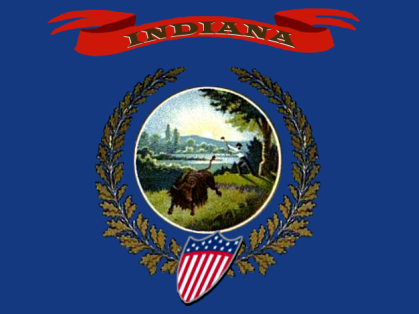
- November 3, 1896
- Turnout: 95.1% ▲6.1 pp

Nominee	William McKinley	William Jennings Bryan
Party	Republican	Democratic
Alliance		Populist
Home state	Ohio	Nebraska
Running mate	Garret Hobart	Arthur Sewall
Electoral vote	15	0
Popular vote	323,754	305,573
Percentage	50.81%	47.96%
County results
McKinley
40–50%
50–60%
60–70%
Bryan
50–60%
60–70%
70–80%
President before election
Grover Cleveland
Democratic
Elected President
William McKinley
Republican

A presidential election was held in Indiana on November 3, 1896, as part of the 1896 United States presidential election. The Republican ticket of the former governor of Ohio William McKinley and the former president of the New Jersey Senate Garret Hobart defeated the Democratic and Populist ticket of the former U.S. representative from Nebraska's 1st congressional district William Jennings Bryan and the president of the Maine Central Railroad Arthur Sewall. McKinley defeated Bryan in the national election with 271 electoral votes.

== General election ==
=== Summary ===
Indiana chose 15 electors in a statewide general election. Voters elected each member of the Electoral College individually; under this system, electors nominated by the same party often received differing numbers of votes as a consequence of voter rolloff, split-ticket voting, or electoral fusion. This table reflects the statewide popular vote as calculated by Svend Petersen.

1896 United States presidential election in Indiana
Party	Candidate	Votes	%	±%
Republican	William McKinley Garret Hobart	323,754	50.81	▲4.80
Democratic–Populist	William Jennings Bryan Arthur Sewall	305,573	47.96	▼3.67
Prohibition	Joshua Levering Hale Johnson	3,056	0.48	▼1.88
National	Charles Eugene Bentley James H. Southgate	2,267	0.36	▲0.36
National Democratic	John M. Palmer Simon Bolivar Buckner	2,145	0.34	▲0.34
Socialist Labor	Charles H. Matchett Matthew Maguire	329	0.05	▲0.05
Total votes		637,124	100.00	

=== Results ===
1896 United States presidential election in Indiana
Party	Candidate	Votes
Republican	Henry G. Thayer	323,754
Republican	Charles F. Jones	321,363
Republican	Arthur M. Wood	321,315
Republican	Donald McCallum	321,303
Republican	William C. Hall	321,299
Republican	Edmund A. Maginness	321,289
Republican	Eugene C. Thompson	321,279
Republican	Samuel W. Gould	321,272
Republican	Caldwell W. Tuttle	321,271
Republican	Jehu Z. Powell	321,266
Republican	Benjamin G. Shinn	321,264
Republican	James R. Christian	321,263
Republican	D. McA. Williams	321,261
Republican	Addison C. Harris	321,241
Republican	William C. Mason	321,236
Democratic–Populist	John B. Stoll	305,573
Democratic–Populist	Parda D. Drain	303,038
Democratic–Populist	Delano E. Williamson	303,032
Democratic–Populist	James W. Henson	303,027
Democratic–Populist	Elisha A. Riggins	303,017
Democratic–Populist	George B. McIntyre	303,010
Democratic–Populist	Townsend Cope	303,001
Democratic–Populist	George W. Pigman	302,983
Democratic–Populist	Maurice Donnelly	302,979
Democratic–Populist	Bartlett H. Campbell	302,972
Democratic–Populist	William C. Smith	302,970
Democratic–Populist	James W. Pierce	302,958
Democratic–Populist	Meredith H. Kidd	302,949
Democratic–Populist	John S. Bender	302,946
Democratic–Populist	Frank B. Van Auken	302,939
Prohibition	Benjamin F. Watson	3,056
Prohibition	Lorenzo D. Crooks	2,930
Prohibition	Jason Henley	2,930
Prohibition	David W. Welch	2,930
Prohibition	Charles W. Culbertson	2,929
Prohibition	James H. McCully	2,928
Prohibition	Basil L. Allen	2,926
Prohibition	Wilhelm Krensel	2,926
Prohibition	Frank Williamson	2,926
Prohibition	William S. Ferrier	2,925
Prohibition	Frederick L. Ray	2,925
Prohibition	Robert M. Brotherton	2,924
Prohibition	Abraham Huntsinger	2,922
Prohibition	Melvin T. Bishop	2,921
Prohibition	Benjamin F. Nichols	2,921
National	John L. Shields	2,267
National	Samuel L. Carter	2,222
National	Wharton Benton	2,223
National	Joseph L. Dunlap	2,222
National	Will V. King	2,222
National	Lewis A. Morgan	2,222
National	William J. Trout	2,222
National	John M. Daniel	2,221
National	George W. Hagan	2,221
National	William L. Northam	2,220
National	Elijah L. Dilley	2,219
National	William S. Elliott	2,219
National	Owen Switzer	2,219
National	Frank P. Taggart	2,218
National	Joe Pauley	2,217
National Democratic	John C. Robinson	2,145
National Democratic	Thomas J. Terhune	2,089
National Democratic	Charles P. Bacon	2,068
National Democratic	Robert N. Palmer	2,066
National Democratic	Alexander A. Davison	2,063
National Democratic	Leonidas A. Rizer	2,063
National Democratic	John Scofield	2,063
National Democratic	Richard J. Wilson	2,063
National Democratic	Jasper N. Davidson	2,062
National Democratic	Dayton L. Heritage	2,062
National Democratic	Malcolm A. McDonald	2,062
National Democratic	William F. Carson	2,061
National Democratic	Francis T. Hord	2,061
National Democratic	John F. W. Meyer	2,061
National Democratic	Melville W. Mix	2,061
Socialist Labor	Ernest Viewehg	329
Socialist Labor	Christ Schaad	324
Total		≈637,124

=== Results by county ===
1896 United States presidential election in Indiana by county
County	William McKinley Republican		William Jennings Bryan Democratic		Others		Margin		Total
County	Votes	Percent	Votes	Percent	Votes	Percent	Votes	Percent	Total
Adams	1,613	32.09%	3,340	66.45%	73	1.45%	-1,727	-34.36%	5,026
Allen	8,467	45.44%	9,909	53.18%	256	1.37%	-1,442	-7.74%	18,632
Bartholomew	3,264	50.03%	3,198	49.02%	62	0.95%	66	1.01%	6,524
Benton	1,998	55.29%	1,572	43.50%	44	1.22%	426	11.79%	3,614
Blackford	2,154	47.86%	2,272	50.48%	75	1.67%	-118	-2.62%	4,501
Boone	3,449	47.23%	3,800	52.03%	54	0.74%	-351	-4.81%	7,303
Brown	726	32.63%	1,480	66.52%	19	0.85%	-754	-33.89%	2,225
Carroll	2,546	47.43%	2,764	51.49%	58	1.08%	-218	-4.06%	5,368
Cass	4,392	46.88%	4,851	51.78%	126	1.34%	-459	-4.90%	9,369
Clark	3,897	50.23%	3,785	48.79%	76	0.98%	112	1.44%	7,758
Clay	3,823	45.55%	4,482	53.40%	88	1.05%	-659	-7.85%	8,393
Clinton	3,607	48.38%	3,747	50.26%	101	1.35%	-140	-1.88%	7,455
Crawford	1,490	47.27%	1,655	52.51%	7	0.22%	-165	-5.23%	3,152
Daviess	3,120	45.00%	3,785	54.59%	29	0.42%	-665	-9.59%	6,934
De Kalb	3,137	45.56%	3,678	53.41%	71	1.03%	-541	-7.86%	6,886
Dearborn	2,714	44.75%	3,313	54.62%	38	0.63%	-599	-9.88%	6,065
Decatur	2,848	52.56%	2,520	46.50%	51	0.94%	328	6.05%	5,419
Delaware	7,340	62.29%	4,253	36.09%	191	1.62%	3,087	26.20%	11,784
Dubois	1,215	28.64%	3,005	70.82%	23	0.54%	-1,790	-42.19%	4,243
Elkhart	6,150	54.08%	4,986	43.85%	235	2.07%	1,164	10.24%	11,371
Fayette	2,145	56.70%	1,609	42.53%	29	0.77%	536	14.17%	3,783
Floyd	3,874	51.74%	3,544	47.34%	69	0.92%	330	4.41%	7,487
Fountain	2,809	47.99%	2,997	51.20%	47	0.80%	-188	-3.21%	5,853
Franklin	1,760	38.07%	2,844	61.52%	19	0.41%	-1,084	-23.45%	4,623
Fulton	2,349	49.00%	2,409	50.25%	36	0.75%	-60	-1.25%	4,794
Gibson	3,471	48.38%	3,622	50.48%	82	1.14%	-151	-2.10%	7,175
Grant	7,723	58.95%	5,072	38.72%	305	2.33%	2,651	20.24%	13,100
Greene	3,434	50.28%	3,344	48.96%	52	0.76%	90	1.32%	6,830
Hamilton	4,643	59.82%	2,947	37.97%	171	2.20%	1,696	21.85%	7,761
Hancock	2,236	43.22%	2,886	55.79%	51	0.99%	-650	-12.57%	5,173
Harrison	2,486	46.48%	2,813	52.59%	50	0.93%	-327	-6.11%	5,349
Hendricks	3,409	58.06%	2,365	40.28%	98	1.67%	1,044	17.78%	5,872
Henry	4,001	56.43%	2,980	42.03%	109	1.54%	1,021	14.40%	7,090
Howard	4,195	55.59%	3,191	42.29%	160	2.12%	1,004	13.31%	7,546
Huntington	4,117	51.31%	3,750	46.73%	157	1.96%	367	4.57%	8,024
Jackson	2,670	42.43%	3,574	56.79%	49	0.78%	-904	-14.37%	6,293
Jasper	2,032	55.05%	1,608	43.57%	51	1.38%	424	11.49%	3,691
Jay	3,473	47.66%	3,680	50.50%	134	1.84%	-207	-2.84%	7,287
Jefferson	3,636	57.30%	2,645	41.69%	64	1.01%	991	15.62%	6,345
Jennings	2,040	52.00%	1,850	47.16%	33	0.84%	190	4.84%	3,923
Johnson	2,288	41.92%	3,083	56.49%	87	1.59%	-795	-14.57%	5,458
Knox	3,480	43.87%	4,349	54.83%	103	1.30%	-869	-10.96%	7,932
Kosciusko	4,342	55.61%	3,372	43.19%	94	1.20%	970	12.42%	7,808
La Porte	4,691	50.28%	4,511	48.35%	127	1.36%	180	1.93%	9,329
Lagrange	2,442	58.97%	1,665	40.21%	34	0.82%	777	18.76%	4,141
Lake	4,883	58.11%	3,418	40.68%	102	1.21%	1,465	17.43%	8,403
Lawrence	3,103	55.70%	2,421	43.46%	47	0.84%	682	12.24%	5,571
Madison	8,388	51.96%	7,590	47.02%	164	1.02%	798	4.94%	16,142
Marion	27,353	55.98%	20,654	42.27%	853	1.75%	6,699	13.71%	48,860
Marshall	2,938	44.45%	3,588	54.29%	83	1.26%	-650	-9.84%	6,609
Martin	1,384	44.37%	1,719	55.11%	16	0.51%	-335	-10.74%	3,119
Miami	3,396	47.54%	3,602	50.43%	145	2.03%	-206	-2.88%	7,143
Monroe	2,510	50.20%	2,422	48.44%	68	1.36%	88	1.76%	5,000
Montgomery	4,353	50.60%	4,183	48.62%	67	0.78%	170	1.98%	8,603
Morgan	2,688	52.23%	2,414	46.91%	44	0.86%	274	5.32%	5,146
Newton	1,545	55.64%	1,204	43.36%	28	1.01%	341	12.28%	2,777
Noble	3,372	51.78%	3,071	47.16%	69	1.06%	301	4.62%	6,512
Ohio	705	52.61%	634	47.31%	1	0.07%	71	5.30%	1,340
Orange	2,044	52.80%	1,797	46.42%	30	0.77%	247	6.38%	3,871
Owen	1,751	45.45%	2,070	53.72%	32	0.83%	-319	-8.28%	3,853
Parke	2,847	49.74%	2,777	48.52%	100	1.75%	70	1.22%	5,724
Perry	2,139	49.94%	2,109	49.24%	35	0.82%	30	0.70%	4,283
Pike	2,332	47.42%	2,557	51.99%	29	0.59%	-225	-4.58%	4,918
Porter	2,853	58.06%	2,026	41.23%	35	0.71%	827	16.83%	4,914
Posey	2,526	44.50%	3,103	54.66%	48	0.85%	-577	-10.16%	5,677
Pulaski	1,345	39.97%	1,964	58.37%	56	1.66%	-619	-18.40%	3,365
Putnam	2,622	44.37%	3,218	54.46%	69	1.17%	-596	-10.09%	5,909
Randolph	4,674	62.77%	2,677	35.95%	95	1.28%	1,997	26.82%	7,446
Ripley	2,690	49.60%	2,714	50.05%	19	0.35%	-24	-0.44%	5,423
Rush	2,891	51.88%	2,602	46.69%	80	1.44%	289	5.19%	5,573
Scott	837	40.07%	1,237	59.21%	15	0.72%	-400	-19.15%	2,089
Shelby	3,219	44.62%	3,828	53.06%	167	2.31%	-609	-8.44%	7,214
Spencer	3,047	52.34%	2,745	47.15%	30	0.52%	302	5.19%	5,822
St. Joseph	7,138	52.79%	6,247	46.20%	136	1.01%	891	6.59%	13,521
Starke	1,289	51.01%	1,214	48.04%	24	0.95%	75	2.97%	2,527
Steuben	2,655	60.16%	1,674	37.93%	84	1.90%	981	22.23%	4,413
Sullivan	2,317	36.15%	4,010	62.57%	82	1.28%	-1,693	-26.42%	6,409
Switzerland	1,637	48.27%	1,742	51.37%	12	0.35%	-105	-3.10%	3,391
Tippecanoe	6,239	56.77%	4,639	42.21%	111	1.01%	1,600	14.56%	10,989
Tipton	2,263	44.07%	2,816	54.84%	56	1.09%	-553	-10.77%	5,135
Union	1,118	54.06%	915	44.25%	35	1.69%	203	9.82%	2,068
Vanderburgh	8,068	52.74%	7,132	46.62%	97	0.63%	936	6.12%	15,297
Vermillion	2,141	53.61%	1,814	45.42%	39	0.98%	327	8.19%	3,994
Vigo	8,020	51.17%	7,558	48.23%	94	0.60%	462	2.95%	15,672
Wabash	4,319	59.04%	2,891	39.52%	105	1.44%	1,428	19.52%	7,315
Warren	2,045	64.27%	1,100	34.57%	37	1.16%	945	29.70%	3,182
Warrick	2,482	45.78%	2,902	53.52%	38	0.70%	-420	-7.75%	5,422
Washington	2,214	45.52%	2,613	53.72%	37	0.76%	-399	-8.20%	4,864
Wayne	6,841	61.67%	4,098	36.94%	154	1.39%	2,743	24.73%	11,093
Wells	2,212	36.63%	3,728	61.74%	98	1.62%	-1,516	-25.11%	6,038
White	2,383	47.57%	2,537	50.65%	89	1.78%	-154	-3.07%	5,009
Whitley	2,242	46.85%	2,494	52.12%	49	1.02%	-252	-5.27%	4,785
Totals	323,754	50.82%	305,573	47.96%	7,792	1.22%	18,181	2.85%	637,119

== See also ==
- United States presidential elections in Indiana

== Bibliography ==
- Owen, William D. (1897). Biennial Report of William D. Owen, Secretary of State of the State of Indiana [...]. Indianapolis.
- Madison, James H. (1986). The Indiana Way: A State History. Bloomington: Indiana University Press.
- Petersen, Svend (1963). A Statistical History of the American Presidential Elections. New York: Frederick Ungar Publishing Company. LCCN 62-21786.
