= John Starkweather =

John Starkweather may refer to:

- John Amsden Starkweather, American professor of medical psychology
- John Converse Starkweather, general in the Union Army during the American Civil War
