= James Z. Wang =

Chinese-American computer scientist

James Ze Wang
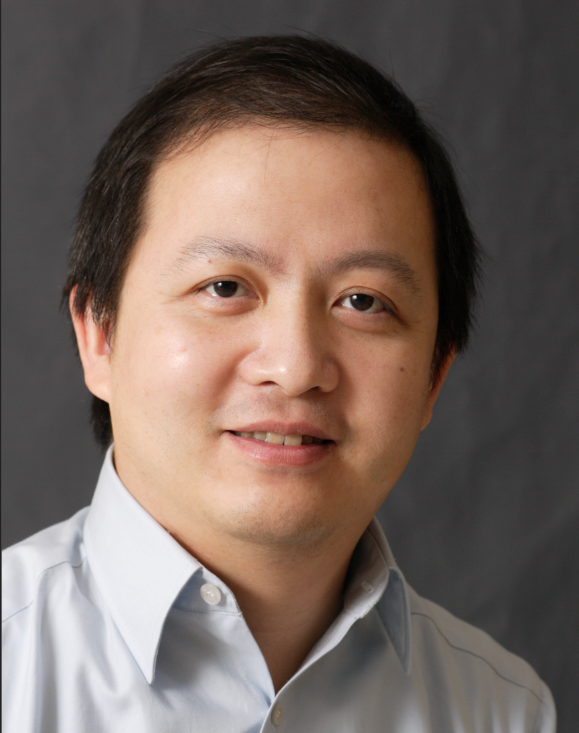
- Wang in December 2015
- Born: 1972 (age 53–54); Beijing, China
- Citizenship: United States
- Education: Stanford University (M.S., M.S., Ph.D.); University of Minnesota (B.S.)
- Known for: image retrieval, image annotation, painting analysis, visual aesthetics and emotions, big visual data
- Scientific career
- Fields: Computer science Information technology
- Workplaces: Pennsylvania State University
- Doctoral advisor: Gio Wiederhold

James Ze Wang (Chinese: 王则; born 1972) is a Chinese-American computer scientist. He is a distinguished professor of the College of Information Sciences and Technology at Pennsylvania State University. He is also an affiliated professor of the Molecular, Cellular, and Integrative Biosciences Program; the Computational Science Graduate Minor; and the Social Data Analytics Graduate Program. He is co-director of the Intelligent Information Systems Laboratory. He was a visiting professor of the Robotics Institute at Carnegie Mellon University from 2007 to 2008. In 2011 and 2012, he served as a program manager in the Office of International Science and Engineering at the National Science Foundation. He is the second son of Chinese mathematician Wang Yuan.

== Education ==
Wang received a summa cum laude bachelor's degree in mathematics and computer science from the University of Minnesota (advisor: Dennis Hejhal), an M.S. in mathematics and an M.S. in computer science, both from Stanford University, and a Ph.D. degree in medical information sciences from Stanford University's Biomedical Informatics and Database groups (advisor: Gio Wiederhold, committee members: Hector Garcia-Molina and Stephen T.C. Wong).

== Research ==
Wang is the author or coauthor of two monographs and over 100 journal articles, book chapters, and refereed conference papers, including one coauthored paper published in Science. His works have been widely cited. For example, SIMPLIcity: Semantics-Sensitive Integrated Matching for Picture Libraries (2001) has received more than 2000 citations. Image Retrieval: Ideas, Influences, and Trends of the New Age (2008) has received about 4000 citations.

He has carried out work with the Biomedical Informatics Group and the Computer Science Database Group at Stanford that makes possible the retrieval of specific images from databanks of images. He has co-developed the SIMPLIcity semantics-sensitive image retrieval system, the ALIPR automatic linguistic indexing of pictures system, and the ACQUINE visual aesthetics rating system. These systems have been applied to several domains including biomedical image analysis, satellite imaging, Web image filtering, and art and cultural imaging. The SIMPLIcity system has been sought after and obtained by researchers from more than 100 institutions.

His studies have also involved retrieval from large-scale genome databases through pattern recognition. His research work has been reported widely by significant media including Discovery, Scientific American, MIT Tech Review, Public Radio, NPR, and CBS.

Wang has served as a General Chair for the 11th Association for Computing Machinery (ACM) International Conference on Multimedia Information Retrieval (Philadelphia, March 2010), a Program Committee Vice Chair for the 12th International World Wide Web Conference and as an ad hoc reviewer for 60+ scientific journals and many conferences. He has served on the EU/DELOS-US/NSF Working Group on Digital Imagery for Significant Cultural and Historical Materials and provided a written testimony at the National Academies Committee on Tools and Strategies for Protecting Kids from Pornography and Their Applicability to Other Inappropriate Internet Content.

Wang was featured in a PBS series NOVA ScienceNow (Art Authentication, Season 3 and Season 4). He contributed in developing new computerized methods to help detect fake Van Gogh paintings by analyzing the direction and amount of brushstrokes in the painting, as compared to original Van Gogh's. He was successful in determining the fake version of the painting, produced by Charlotte Caspers, from the original.

== Awards ==
Wang has been a recipient of an NSF Career award and the endowed PNC Technologies Career Development Professorship (provided to Penn State by the PNC Foundation).

== Publications ==
=== Books ===
- Region-Based Image Retrieval, James Z. Wang, 2001, 192 p., ISBN 978-0-7923-7350-6, Kluwer Academic Publishers (now merged into Springer)
- Machine Learning And Statistical Modeling Approaches To Image Retrieval, Yixin Chen, Jia Li, James Z Wang, 2004, 182 p., ISBN 978-1-4020-8034-0, Springer

=== Representative peer-reviewed papers ===
- James Z. Wang, Jia Li and Gio Wiederhold, SIMPLIcity: Semantics-Sensitive Integrated Matching for Picture Libraries, IEEE Transactions on Pattern Analysis and Machine Intelligence, vol. 23, no. 9, pp. 947–963, 2001.
- Datta, Ritendra; Dhiraj Joshi; Jia Li; James Z. Wang (2008). "Image Retrieval: Ideas, Influences, and Trends of the New Age". ACM Computing Surveys. doi:10.1145/1348246.1348248. S2CID 7060187.
- Jia Li and James Z. Wang, Automatic Linguistic Indexing of Pictures by a Statistical Modeling Approach, IEEE Transactions on Pattern Analysis and Machine Intelligence, vol. 25, no. 9, pp. 1075–1088, 2003.
- Jia Li and James Z. Wang, Real-time Computerized Annotation of Pictures, IEEE Transactions on Pattern Analysis and Machine Intelligence, vol. 30, no. 6, pp. 985–1002, 2008.
- Yixin Chen and James Z. Wang, Image Categorization by Learning and Reasoning with Regions, Journal of Machine Learning Research, vol. 5, 913–939, August 2004.
- Ritendra Datta, Dhiraj Joshi, Jia Li and James Z. Wang, Studying Aesthetics in Photographic Images Using a Computational Approach, Lecture Notes in Computer Science, vol. 3953, Proceedings of the European Conference on Computer Vision, Part III, pp. 288–301, Graz, Austria, May 2006.
- Yixin Chen, Jinbo Bi and James Z. Wang, MILES: Multiple-Instance Learning via Embedded Instance Selection, IEEE Transactions on Pattern Analysis and Machine Intelligence, vol. 28, no. 12, pp. 1931–1947, 2006.
- Lei Yao, Poonam Suryanarayan, Mu Qiao, James Z. Wang and Jia Li, OSCAR: On-Site Composition and Aesthetics Feedback through Exemplars for Photographers, International Journal of Computer Vision, vol. 96, no. 3, pp. 353–383, 2012.
- Dhiraj Joshi, Ritendra Datta, Quang-Tuan Luong, Elena Fedorovskaya, James Z. Wang, Jia Li and Jiebo Luo, Aesthetics and Emotions in Images: A Computational Perspective, IEEE Signal Processing Magazine, vol. 28, no. 5, pp. 94–115, September 2011.
- Jia Li, Lei Yao, Ella Hendriks and James Z. Wang, Rhythmic Brushstrokes Distinguish van Gogh from His Contemporaries: Findings via Automated Brushstroke Extraction, IEEE Transactions on Pattern Analysis and Machine Intelligence, vol. 34, no. 6, pp. 1159–1176, 2012.
- Yixin Chen and James Z. Wang, A Region-Based Fuzzy Feature Matching Approach to Content-Based Image Retrieval, IEEE Transactions on Pattern Analysis and Machine Intelligence, vol. 24, no. 9, pp. 1252–1267, 2002.
- James Z. Wang, Gio Wiederhold, Oscar Firschein and Sha Xin Wei, Content-Based Image Indexing and Searching Using Daubechies' Wavelets, International Journal on Digital Libraries, vol. 1, no. 4, pp. 311–328, Springer-Verlag, 1998.
- Yu Zhang, Stephen Wistar, Jia Li, Michael A. Steinberg and James Z. Wang, Severe Thunderstorm Detection by Visual Learning Using Satellite Images, IEEE Transactions on Geoscience and Remote Sensing, vol. 55, no. 2, pp. 1039-1052, 2017.
- Yixin Chen, James Z. Wang and Robert Krovetz, CLUE: Cluster-based Retrieval of Images by Unsupervised Learning, IEEE Transactions on Image Processing, vol. 14, no. 8, pp. 1187–1201, 2005.
- Xin Lu, Poonam Suryanarayan, Reginald B. Adams, Jr., Jia Li, Michelle G. Newman and James Z. Wang, On Shape and the Computability of Emotions, Proceedings of the ACM Multimedia Conference, pp. 229–238, Nara, Japan, ACM, October 2012.
- Dhiraj Joshi, James Z. Wang and Jia Li, The Story Picturing Engine - A System for Automatic Text Illustration, ACM Transactions on Multimedia Computing, Communications and Applications, vol. 2, no. 1, pp. 68–89, 2006.
- Jianbo Ye, Panruo Wu, James Z. Wang and Jia Li, Fast Discrete Distribution Clustering Using Wasserstein Barycenter with Sparse Support, IEEE Transactions on Signal Processing, vol. 65, no. __, 16 pages, 2017,
