= William McKinley presidential campaign =

William McKinley, the 25th President of the United States, successfully ran for president twice:

- William McKinley presidential campaign, 1896
- William McKinley presidential campaign, 1900, the successful reelection campaign William McKinley conducted in 1900
