= Carl Porter Duncan =

American professor of psychology

- Born: December 27, 1921; Presque Isle, Maine
- Died: August 9, 1999 (aged 77); Libertyville, Illinois
- Citizenship: United States
- Education: University of Maine, B.A. in Art, 1942; Brown University, M.A. in Psychology, 1944; Brown University, Ph.D. in Psychology, 1947
- Known for: research on electroshock and the physiology of memory
- Awards: Chair of the Section on Psychology of the American Association for the Advancement of Science, President of the Midwestern Psychological Association
- Scientific career
- Fields: Psychology
- Workplaces: Northwestern University
- Doctoral advisor: Harold Schlosberg
- Doctoral students: John Amsden Starkweather

Carl Porter Duncan (December 27, 1921 – August 9, 1999) was a professor of experimental psychology at Northwestern University.

Carl P. Duncan was born on December 27, 1921, in Presque Isle, Maine.

His father, Henry Beecher Duncan, was a farmer and his mother Vivian Howlett Duncan, a schoolteacher.

Duncan received his BA degree from University of Maine. He also received an MA degree (1944) and a PhD degree (1947) in experimental psychology at Brown University, both under the direction of Harold Schlosberg. His PhD thesis, The Effect of Electroshock Convulsions on Learning and Retention in The Rat is regarded as seminal, a classic study in cognitive neuroscience.

Duncan met his wife, Marie Castaldi, while at Brown University, and they were married in 1948. She received her doctor of medicine degree in 1951, and practiced in adolescent psychiatry. They had no children.

Professor Duncan, after getting his PhDs at Brown, began working at Northwestern University in 1947. In 1966 he was elected president of the Midwestern Psychological Association. In the American Psychological Association (APA), Professor Duncan was a fellow of Division 3, a member of its executive committee from 1962 to 1964, and one of its representatives to the APA Council of Representatives from 1966 to 1968. He served as the secretary-treasurer to the Society of Experimental Psychologists from 1970 to 1973. He was also chair of the Section on Psychology of the American Association for the Advancement of Science in 1973. From 1972 to 1985, he served as a book review editor for the American Journal of Psychology.

Duncan retired with the title of professor emeritus in 1987, after a 40-year career at Northwestern University and stayed in the Chicago area (specifically, in Libertyville, Illinois) for the rest of his life.

Duncan suffered a fatal fall on August 9, 1999, while trimming a tree.
