= PILOT =

Simple high-level programming language developed in the 1960s

Programmed Inquiry, Learning, or Teaching (PILOT) is a simple high-level programming language developed in the 1960s. Like its sibling LOGO, it was developed as an early foray into the technology of computer-assisted instruction.

PILOT is an imperative language similar in structure to BASIC and FORTRAN in its basic layout and structure. Its keywords are single characters, T for "type" to print text, or A for "accept", to input values from the user.

== History ==
Starting in 1960, John Amsden Starkweather a psychology professor at the University of California, San Francisco (UCSF) medical center, developed a simple system for automating the construction of computer question-and-answer tests. Working with the Dixie Elementary School District in Marin County, by 1962 the system was functional on a IBM 1620 and given the name COMPUTEST.

UCSF installed a IBM System/360 Model 50, and Starkweather applied for a grant for further development by the U.S. Office of Education in 1965. Using this funding, Starkweather began development of an expanded version of the system with more functionality. He gave this version the new name PILOT. Early versions were shown in 1966, and the almost-complete version was released in 1968. The next year it was released into the public domain.

PILOT was later adopted by H. Dean Brown at the Stanford Research Institute (SRI) Education Laboratory. Brown popularized PILOT as a language for use directly by children. Brown's efforts changed the language from one intended for use by teachers to write tests and instructional materials to one intended to be used to teach programming.

PILOT was ported to a number of other systems, and various extensions and changes added at these sites. This led to a number of incompatible implementations with names like PYLON and NYLON. In 1973, Starkweather brought together a number of people interested in computer aided teaching to develop a machine-independent specification for the language, PILOT-73. A portable subset was also defined as Core PILOT. Core was then ported to the Datapoint 2200, an Intel 8008 powered terminal that would later be known as a personal computer. At $13,000, this was more expensive than many contemporary minicomputers and did not see much use. However, this port proved very useful after the Intel 8080 came to market and spawned many inexpensive microcomputers.

Starting in the late 1970s, Western Washington University began expanding the language into Common PILOT. This formed the basis for a number of later microcomputer variants. Processor Technology developed a version for their Sol-20, but the company went out of business before it was published. This nevertheless inspired several other versions during this era. Among these was Nevada PILOT for CP/M systems, based on Common, which in turn was the basis for Atari PILOT, which added a graphics system using turtle graphics and basic sound support. PILOT on the Apple II was written in UCSD Pascal. These versions led to a revival of the PILOT language for teaching, and led to an expanded version known as Super PILOT which added device control so programs could play videodisks and similar tasks.

For a time there was an effort to make a single standard for the language as IEEE Standard 1154-1991, but this was abandoned in 2000.

== Language syntax ==
A line of PILOT code contains (from left to right) the following syntax elements:

- an optional label
- a command letter
- an optional Y (for yes) or N (for no)
- an optional conditional expression in parentheses
- a colon (":")
- an operand, or multiple operands delimited by commas.

A label can also be alone in a line, not followed by other code. The syntax for a label is an asterisk followed by an identifier (alphanumeric string with alphabetic initial character).

=== Command letters ===
The following commands are used in "core PILOT". Lines beginning with "R:" indicate a remark (or a comment) explaining the code that follows.

A
Accept input into "accept buffer". Examples:

 R:Next line of input replaces current contents of accept buffer
 A:
 R:Next line of input replaces accept buffer, and string variable 'FREE'
 A:$FREE
 R:Next 3 lines of input assigned to string variables 'X', 'Y' and 'Z'
 A:$X,$Y,$Z
 R:Numeric input assigned to numeric variable "Q"
 A:#Q

C
Compute and assign numeric value. Most PILOT implementations have only integer arithmetic, and no arrays. Example:

 R:Assign arithmetic mean of #X and #Y to #AM
 C:#AM=(#X+#Y)/2

D
Dimension an array, on some implementations.

E
End (return from) subroutine or (if outside of a subroutine) abort program. Always used without any operand.

J
Jump to a label. Example:

  J:*RESTART

M
Match the accept buffer against string variables or string literals. Example:

  R:Search accept buffer for "TRUTH", the value of MEXICO and "YOUTH", in that order
  M:TRUTH,$MEXICO,YOUTH

The first match string (if any) that is a substring of the accept buffer is assigned to the special variable $MATCH. The buffer characters left of the first match are assigned to $LEFT, and the characters on the right are assigned to $RIGHT.

The match flag is set to 'yes' or 'no', depending on whether a match is made. Any statement that has a Y following the command letter is processed only if the match flag is set. Statements with N are processed only if the flag is not set.

N
Equivalent to TN: (type if last match unsuccessful)

R
The operand of R: is a comment, and therefore has no effect.

T
'Type' operand as output. Examples:

  R:The next line prints a literal string
  T:Thank you for your support.
  R:The next line combines a literal string with a variable expression
  T:Thank you, $NAME.

U
Use (call) a subroutine. A subroutine starts with a label and ends with E: Example:

  R:Call subroutine starting at label *INITIALIZE
  U:*INITIALIZE

Y
Equivalent to TY: (type if last match successful)

Parentheses
If there is a parenthesized expression in a statement, it is a conditional expression, and the statement is processed only if the test has a value of 'true'. Example:

  R:Type message if x>y+z
  T(#X>#Y+#Z):Condition met

== Derivatives ==
Extensions to core PILOT include arrays and floating point numbers in Apple PILOT for the Apple II, and LOGO-inspired turtle graphics in Atari PILOT for Atari 8-bit computers.

Between 1979 and 1983 the UK PILOT User Group was run by Alec Wood a teacher at Wirral Grammar School for Boys, Merseyside UK. Several machine code versions of a mini PILOT were produced for the microcomputers of the time and a school in Scotland developed an interactive foreign language tutorial where pupils guided footprints around a town asking and answering questions in German, French, etc. An article in the December 1979 of Computer Age covered an early implementation called Tiny Pilot and gave a complete machine code listing.

Versions of PILOT written using BASIC interpreters were released in the 1970s and early 1980s. The April 1973 edition of People's Computer Company's newsletter included such a system written in HP Time-Shared BASIC for the HP 2100 system. PETPILOT (PILOT for the Commodore PET) was the first non-Commodore language for the PET and was written in Microsoft BASIC which shipped with the PET, with a little assistance from Bill Gates. It was created in 1979 by Dave Gomberg and could run on a 4K PET (which was never shipped) and ran well on the 8K PETs that Commodore shipped. It was written in Larry Tessler's living room on PET serial number 2. In 1978, Byte Magazine published a non-Turing complete derivative of PILOT known as Waduzitdo by Larry Kheriarty.

Atari PILOT, released in ROM cartridge form in 1981 for the Atari 8-bit computers, added turtle graphics and sound support. These instructions used two-letter commands. Atari used PILOT as one of their primary languages at the computer camps they ran in the early 1980s. Clarkson College of Technology developed ZPILOT in 1983 for the Zenith Z-100.

1983's Vanilla PILOT for the Commodore 64 also added turtle graphics, as did Super Turtle PILOT which was published as a type-in listing in the October 1987 issue of COMPUTE! magazine.

In 1991 the Institute of Electrical and Electronics Engineers (IEEE) published a standard for Pilot as IEEE Std 1154-1991. It has since been withdrawn. A reference implementation based on this was implemented by Eric Raymond, and maintained—-reluctantly—-for the next 15 years.

In 1990 eSTeem PILOT for Atari ST computers was developed and programmed by Tom Nielsen, EdD. Based on the IEEE Standards for PILOT, it includes Atari-specific features such as control of Laserdisc and CDROM devices.

A 2018 hobbyist implementation, psPILOT, based in part on the IEEE standard, was implemented using Microsoft's PowerShell scripting language.
