= Gio Wiederhold =

Italian-born computer scientist (1936–2022)

- Born: June 24, 1936; Varese, Italy
- Died: December 26, 2022 (aged 86)
- Citizenship: American
- Education: University of California, San Francisco
- Awards: IEEE Fellow; ACM Fellow; Fellow of the ACMI
- Scientific career
- Fields: Computer Science
- Workplaces: Stanford University
- Doctoral advisor: John Amsden Starkweather
- Doctoral students: Hector Garcia-Molina; Jonathan J. King; David E. Shaw; John Shoch; James Z. Wang; Marianne Winslett

Giovanni Corrado Melchiore Wiederhold (June 24, 1936 – December 26, 2022) was an Italian-born American computer scientist who spent most of his career at Stanford University. His research focused on the design of large-scale database management systems, the protection of their content, often using knowledge-based techniques. After his formal retirement he focused on valuation methods for intellectual property and intellectual capital.

== Early life and education ==
Gio Wiederhold was born June 24, 1936, in Varese, Italy. He graduated C.Ae. cum laude in Aeronautical Engineering from the TMS Technicum in Rotterdam, Netherlands in 1957. From 1957 to 1958 he did graduate work at the Technische Hogeschool in Delft. He emigrated to the United States in 1958. Since 1966 he had been married to Voy Yat Jew.

== Early career ==
Wiederhold worked on computations of short-range missile trajectories at NATO's Air Defense Technical Center (SADTC) in Wassenaar near The Hague in 1958. From 1958 to 1961 he worked at IBM's service bureau. Projects at IBM included developing numerical methods for computing the power (specific impulse) of solid rocket fuel combustion in 1959, and inserting alphabetic I/O capability into FORTRAN compilers to allow output of chemical equations in 1960.

In 1962 at the University of California, Berkeley he developed an incremental compiling technology, with a flexibility close to interpreted code, while running at high speed. He also received and completed coursework at UC Berkeley. In 1965 he developed similar techniques for the Stanford University Medical School. The next year he worked on real-time data-acquisition control and data analysis using coupled computers for clinical research, and in 1970 on transposed storage (now termed a Column-oriented DBMS) for databases for very-high speed on-line analytical processing, also at the medical school. From 1973 through 1976 he did graduate work at the University of California, San Francisco in Medical Information Science, with his Ph.D. thesis titled "A Methodology for the Design of Medical Database Systems". An extensive study of computerized ambulatory health care systems, appeared as an appendix to his dissertation.

== Stanford ==
In 1976 Wiederhold joined the faculty of Stanford University. He integrated knowledge base technology exploiting artificial intelligence concepts to provide intelligent and efficient access to databases which he called KBMS. He authored a text book on quantitative aspects of database management systems, first published by McGraw-Hill in 1977. A second edition was published in 1983. In 1995 the copyright was transferred to Wiederhold, who published an expanded version of the book in 2001. He also published a book on file organization for databases in 1987.

From 1991 through 1994 Wiederhold served as a program manager at the Defense Advanced Research Projects Agency (DARPA). He initiated the DARPA Intelligent Integration of Information (I3) program. A visible component is the Digital Library effort, which was delegated to National Science Foundation; the research has opened up new Internet application fields, and funded projects such as Google .

His articles on the data semantic interoperability are at the origin of the modern service-oriented architecture and the success of XML.

He was named a fellow of the American College of Medical Informatics in 1984, a fellow of the Institute of Electrical and Electronics Engineers in 1991, and fellow of the Association for Computing Machinery (ACM) in 1995.

== Later career ==
Wiederhold's career included:

- Rapid presentation of database information for personal computing at VisiCorp (1982).
- Model-based transformation of relational database information into object-oriented representations (1986).
- The architectural concepts leading to mediators (1990).
- The development of a very-high-level Megaprogramming language for software composition in 1992.
- A means to protect outgoing private information in practical databases used for collaboration in 1995.
- Means to integrate projections into the future into information systems—SimQL in 1996.
- An approach to scalable semantic interoperation via an ontology algebra in 1998.
- A method to value software intangibles based on balancing initial and maintenance efforts to allocate income in 2005.

In 2001 he retired to be an emeritus professor of computer science with courtesy appointments in medicine and electrical engineering. Since then he has been consulting through MITRE corporation with the U.S. Treasury on assessing the values of intellectual property exported from the U.S. as part of offshoring. He authored and coauthored more than 400 published papers and reports on computing and medicine and served as the associate editor or editor-in-chief of ACM's Transactions on Database Systems (TODS) from 1982 to 1992. Major books were Database Design, McGraw-Hill, 1977 and 1982 and Valuing Intellectual Capital, Springer 2013.

In June 2011, Wiederhold was awarded an honorary doctorate by NUI Galway.

Wiederhold and his wife Voy developed historical exhibits in Stanford's Computer Science Building in cooperation with the Computer Museum History Center, now the Computer History Museum in Mountain View.

== Personal life and death ==
Wiederhold died on December 26, 2022, at the age of 86.
