= Marianne Winslett =

American computer scientist

Marianne Southall Winslett is a professor emerita of computer science at the University of Illinois at Urbana–Champaign, specializing in databases. She is known for her "possible models" approach to belief revision.

Winslett earned her Ph.D. in 1986 from Stanford University under the supervision of Gio Wiederhold. She joined the UIUC faculty in 1987.

In 2006, she was named a Fellow of the Association for Computing Machinery "for contributions to information management and security". In 2012 she won the SIGMOD Contributions Award for her efforts to document the biographies of notable database pioneers.
