= I. Madison Bentley =

American psychologist (1870–1955)

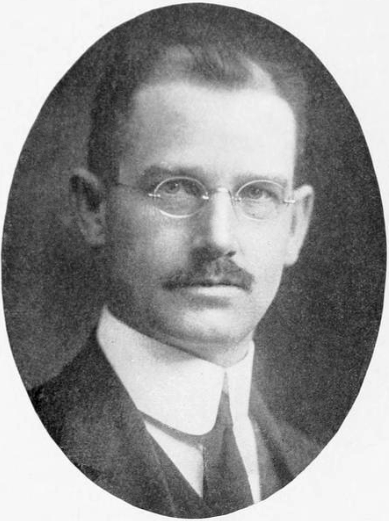
- Born: Isaac Madison Bentley; June 18, 1870; Clinton, Iowa, US
- Died: May 29, 1955 (aged 84); Palo Alto, California, US
- Education: University of Nebraska; University of Leipzig; Cornell University
- Occupation: Psychologist
- Parents: Charles Eugene Bentley (father); Persis Orilla Freeman (mother)

I. Madison Bentley, also known as Isaac Madison Bentley and later as Madison Bentley (June 18, 1870 – May 29, 1955) was an American psychologist. His first publication in 1897 was under the name "I. Madison Bentley."

Bentley was one of the first to write about gender in his 1945 publication Sanity and Hazard in Childhood.

== Early life and education ==
Isaac Madison Bentley was born in Clinton, Iowa to Charles Eugene Bentley and Persis Orilla Freeman on June 18, 1870.

The Bentleys were from Upstate New York, the town of Warners northeast of Syracuse.

Bentley studied psychology at the University of Nebraska. Harry Kirke Wolfe was his mentor. He also studied under Wilhelm Wundt at the University of Leipzig during the AY1886-1887, later taking his bachelor's degree in 1895. He then commenced graduate work at Cornell University under the supervision of Edward B. Titchener, receiving his PhD in 1899.

Isaac Madison Bentley was christened Isaac Madison, but abbreviated his first name to "I." sometime early in his adulthood. In 1909, he dropped the "I" because it was often misprinted as "J", especially in German publications.

== Academic career ==
Teaching at Cornell, Bentley was elevated to assistant professor in 1902; chairman of the Psychology Department in 1910. He left Cornell for Illinois in 1912. During the First World War, he conducted U.S. Army Air Corps research on the ear. In 1928, Bentley returned to Cornell and became Titchener's successor as the Sage Professor of Psychology and Chairman of the Psychology Department.

He died in Palo Alto, California on May 29, 1955, after a long illness.

== Theoretical disposition ==
Bentley opposed both the behaviorism and mentalism movements of psychology. In his view, psychological functions were different. They surmounted a distinction between the organism and the environment. The environment was absorbed by the organism. Research into psychological functions ought to describe the functions modes and derivations.

== Writings ==
Bentley's works include approximately 159 publications up until approx. 1952.

Bentley's contribution to the field of psychology was prolific. He wrote on the memory image, analysis of complex sensations, learning in paramecia, mental disorders, and anthropological psychology. But I. Madison Bentley's greatest skill was that of editing. He was cooperating editor, American Journal of Psychology, as early as 1903. He remained with the Journal until 1950, finishing out as co-editor. He also tended The Psychological Index (1916 to 1925), served as associate editor, Journal of Comparative Psychology (1921–1935); editor, Journal of Experimental Psychology (1926–1929).

== Member ==
At the University Nebraska, Madison tapped into the Phi Kappa Psi fraternity.
