= Jia Li =

Chinese-American statistician and computer scientist

Jia Li is a Chinese-American statistician and computer scientist known for her research on image annotation and image retrieval. She is a professor of statistics and of computer science at Pennsylvania State University.

== Education and career ==
Li studied information and control engineering at Xi'an Jiaotong University, graduating with a bachelor's degree in 1993. She went to Stanford University for graduate study, earning master's degrees in electrical engineering and statistics in 1995 and 1998 respectively, and completing a Ph.D. in electrical engineering in 1999. Her dissertation, Image Classification and Compression Based on a Two-Dimensional Multiresolution Hidden Markov Model, was supervised by Robert M. Gray.

She joined Penn State in 2000 after a year of research at the Xerox Palo Alto Research Center. She worked at the National Science Foundation as a program director from 2011 to 2013, and has been editor-in-chief of the journal Statistical Analysis and Data Mining from 2018 to 2020.

== Recognition ==
Li became a Fellow of the American Statistical Association in 2019. She was named as a 2020 IEEE Fellow, "for contributions to real-time automatic image annotation and image retrieval".
