= John Amsden Starkweather =

American psychologist

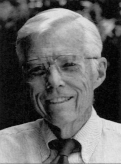
- Born: August 30, 1925; Detroit, Michigan, United States of America
- Died: March 10, 2001 (aged 75); San Rafael, California
- Education: Yale, B.A. in Art, 1950; Northwestern, Ph.D. in Clinical Psychology, 1955
- Known for: PILOT programming language
- Awards: Fellow of the American Association for the Advancement of Science, Fellow of the American College of Medical Informatics
- Scientific career
- Fields: Psychology
- Workplaces: University of California, San Francisco
- Doctoral advisor: Carl Porter Duncan
- Doctoral students: Paul Ekman, Gio Wiederhold

John Amsden Starkweather (August 30, 1925 – March 10, 2001) was an American Professor of Medical Psychology at the University of California, San Francisco (UCSF). Starkweather was a clinical psychologist and a valued teacher by generations of clinical psychology interns and graduate students at UCSF. He was a pioneer in taking a psychologist's view of the emerging computer field and incorporating concepts as well as numbers to language processing.

== Early years ==
Starkweather's father was an engineer and his mother was a poet. He was raised in Seattle, Washington, and served in the United States Coast Guard during World War II from 1943 to 1945. Starkweather graduated from Yale in 1950 with a B.A. in Art and from Northwestern University in 1955 with a Ph.D. in Clinical Psychology. He joined the faculty of the Department of Psychiatry at the University of California, San Francisco in 1955, where he spent his entire career. He married his wife, Jean, in 1952 while he was a graduate student at Northwestern. The Starkweathers had three sons, David, Timothy and Stephen.

== Studies in speech ==
Starkweather took an early interest in speech and language, and especially the expression of emotion in the voice. His dissertation, supervised by professor Carl Porter Duncan at Northwestern, was "Judgments of Content-Free Speech as Related to Some Aspects of Personality" and was the first to show that judges could distinguish reliably among different emotions from content-free speech, created by filtering out frequencies above 300 cycles. He went on to study spectral measures of voice and to show that such measures could track day-to-day changes in the degree of depression in hospitalized patients. However, he is best known for his contributions to computer science in relation to psychology, teaching, and medicine.

== Contributions to computer science ==
The 1950s were remarkable for the introduction of the stored-program computer. As Starkweather pursued his voice-quality research, he created a real-time pitch spectrum analyzer that could generate a 20-band pitch spectrum every two seconds from voice recordings. The quantitative analysis demands of such data plunged him into the use of the primitive computer resources available in the early 1960s.

Starkweather began to realize that he might contribute to computer software development beyond simply being an informed research user. At that time most of the academic attention to computer software focused on quantitative analysis. For example, UCLA was developing the Biomedical Computer Programs, the first reliable and comprehensive statistical analysis package. Starkweather foresaw that psychology, education, and medicine would also need ways for computers to deal with language content. He first developed a programming language called COMPUTEST to allow students and teachers to access teaching materials and examinations by computer, even though the computer hardware needed to accomplish this at the time filled half of a classroom.

As hardware became smaller, he developed the PILOT language (Programmed Inquiry, Learning Or Teaching) that made it easy for non-programmers to write sequences of machine-administered teaching or testing using the time-share terminals in use in 1970, and then microcomputers when they became available a decade later. The National Library of Medicine adopted PILOT as its primary computer language for the dissemination and exchange of computer-based instructional materials in the health sciences, and used it for instructing medical librarians in using MEDLINE. Starkweather chaired a working group for the Institute of Electrical and Electronics Engineers from 1987 through 1991 that established standards for PILOT. The language was in active use for many years. However, the introduction of microcomputers also attracted capital to a budding software industry, and this ended the early period when most non-business software was created in universities; Starkweather thereafter turned his energy to administration.

In the 1960s, Starkweather was the logical person to develop a computer center for UCSF, which he led for 15 years until its operation was ready for a non-faculty administrator. In 1983, he became Academic Vice Chair of the Department of Psychiatry, and made major contributions to departmental planning and advising junior faculty regarding faculty advancement. Starkweather held this position until his retirement in 1993.

== Contributions to UCSF ==
UCSF is a health science campus with no undergraduate programs, and when Starkweather joined the faculty in 1955 there were no degree programs in psychology, although the Clinical Psychology Internship at the Langley Porter Psychiatric Institute was already well known. Starkweather was one of the founders of the Psychology Ph.D. program established at UCSF in 1961 and he chaired the program in its early years. Under the leadership of George Stone, this program was later transformed into the first health psychology Ph.D. program in the country. Starkweather led the creation in 1971 of the UCSF Ph.D. program in Medical Information Sciences, and chaired that program for nine years.

== Civic contributions ==
Starkweather was also a civic leader in the Marin County community where he lived since 1956. He served 12 years on his local school board and 20 years on the city of San Rafael planning commission. He and his wife were active environmentalists in the area. The Jean and John Starkweather Shoreline Park was named for the family in 2003. In 2007 the John Starkweather Learning Center was named for him in an affordable housing community center in San Rafael.

== Honors and awards ==
Starkweather was elected a Fellow of the American Association for the Advancement of Science "for contributions to medical information systems and the application of computers to instruction, inquiry, and learning," and Fellow of the American College of Medical Informatics "for contributions to the field of medical information science." During his career, he served in many university-wide and campus-wide leadership roles, including Chair of the UCSF Academic Senate. Several of his students became leaders in their fields, including the psychologists Paul Ekman, Rudolph Moos, the psychiatrists Donald Langsley, Kay Blacker, and the computer scientist Gio Wiederhold.

== Death ==
Starkweather died March 10, 2001, at the age of 75 from complications of Parkinson's disease.
