= Harold H. Schlosberg =

American psychologist

- Born: January 3, 1904; New York City, U.S.
- Died: August 5, 1964 (aged 60); Providence, Rhode Island, U.S.
- Education: Princeton University (B.A., 1925; M.A., 1926; Ph.D. 1928)
- Known for: research on conditioned reflex in man and animals
- Scientific career
- Fields: Psychology
- Workplaces: Brown University
- Doctoral advisor: Edwin Holt
- Other academic advisors: Leonard Carmichael
- Doctoral students: Carl Porter Duncan, Richard L. Solomon

Harold H. Schlosberg (January 3, 1904 – August 5, 1964) was an American psychologist and professor of psychology at Brown University.

== Biography ==
Born in Brooklyn, New York City, Schlosberg earned his Bachelor's (1925) and Ph.D. (1928) degrees from Princeton University. He became professor of psychology at Brown University at the age of 28. An experimental psychologist, Schlosberg made notable contributions on subjects ranging from conditioned reflexes to the expression of human emotions. He co-authored the 1954 2nd edition of Experimental Psychology, an influential textbook used by a generation of graduate students. In 1954, Schlosberg became chairman of Brown's Department of Psychology and served until his death in 1964. As Chair, he was responsible for planning the construction of Hunter Laboratory, at the time a state-of-the-art building expressly designed for undergraduate teaching and the requirements of psychological research, from animal behavior to visual perception.

Schlosberg was particularly noted for his work on the conditioned reflex, visual perception and the analysis of human emotions. He was among the first to distinguish classical (Pavlovian) conditioning from instrumental (operant) conditioning. He pioneered the description of emotion in terms of spatial dimensions, with labels such as happy versus sad and disgust versus surprise, a description based primarily on the analysis of facial expressions.
