= James H. Southgate =

American vice-presidential candidate (1859–1916)

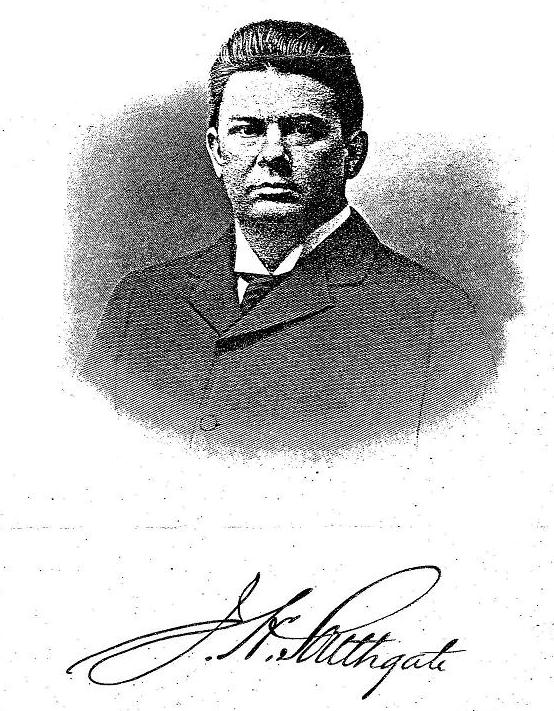
James H. Southgate

James Haywood Southgate (July 12, 1859 – September 29, 1916), was an American spokesman for prohibition. He served as the vice presidential candidate of a faction of the Prohibition Party which broke away from the main party in 1896, running with Charles Eugene Bentley.

== Biography ==
Southgate was born in Norfolk, Virginia, on 12 July 1859, the son of James and Delia (née Haywood) Southgate, and was a descendant of John Southgate of England. He moved with his parents to North Carolina in 1861; there, he attended local academies, and the University of North Carolina (1876–78). He was engaged in the banking and insurance business in Durham, North Carolina, after 1882. That year, he married Katherine "Kate" Fuller, the daughter of Bartholomew and Wilhelmena (née Haldane) Fuller. They had two sons before her sudden death in 1893.

He was a Democrat and became president of the YMCA of North Carolina, as well as treasurer of the State Sunday School Association. He later joined the Prohibition Party and became a member of the platform committee, which held hearings at Cincinnati, Ohio, in 1892.

In Pittsburgh, Pennsylvania in 1896, he voted with a breakaway faction of the party that attempted to broaden the party's appeal beyond the issue of prohibition. Styled as the "National Prohibition Party," "The Liberty Party," or the "Silver Prohibitionists" (after their desire to have the dollar based on the value of silver rather than gold), this party nominated Charles Eugene Bentley of Nebraska for President and Southgate for Vice President. Although many of their supporters abandoned the ticket for Democrat William Jennings Bryan, Bentley and Southgate campaigned without anger or recrimination. The ticket garnered 19,363 votes out of a total of 14 million total votes cast that year, far below the 1892 showing for the party.

A civic leader in Durham, Southgate became a trustee of both Trinity College and Duke University in that city. Southgate died at his home, "Southgate Cabin," in Durham on 29 September 1916 at the age of 57. He was laid to rest in the Maplewood Cemetery in that city.
