= Charles Eugene Bentley =

American politician (1841–1905)

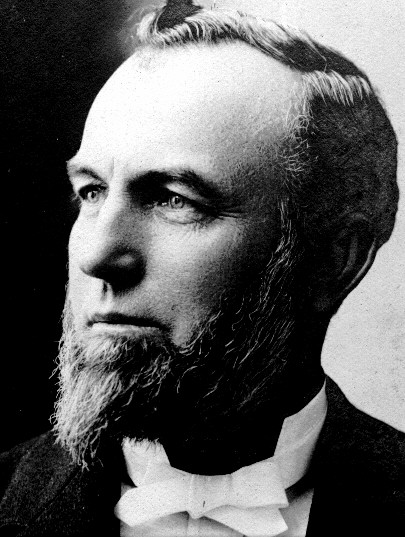

Chairman of the Nebraska National Party
- In office 1896–1905

Personal details
- Born: April 30, 1841 Warners, New York, U.S.
- Died: February 6, 1905 (aged 63) Los Angeles, California, U.S.
- Party: National (1896–1905)
- Other political affiliations: Republican (before 1884); Prohibition (1884–1896)
- Spouse: Persis Orilla Freeman
- Children: 6 - including Isaac Madison Bentley
- Education: Monroe Institute and Oneida Conference Seminary

Charles Eugene Bentley (April 30, 1841 – February 6, 1905) was an American politician who served as the presidential nominee of the National Party, an offshoot party created by the broad gaugers faction of the Prohibition Party, during the 1896 presidential election.

== Life ==
Charles Eugene Bentley was born on April 30, 1841, in Warners, New York. On October 7, 1863, he married Persis Orilla Freeman and moved to Clinton, Iowa in 1866. Bentley served as city clerk, treasurer, and secretary of the board of education. In 1878, he moved to Surprise, Nebraska and later to Lincoln, Nebraska in 1890.

One of his children is Isaac Madison Bentley.

=== Politics ===
During the 1884 presidential election he left the Republican Party to join the Prohibition Party and supported former Kansas Governor John St. John. The first Prohibition state convention in Nebraska was held in 1884 and he was selected to serve as its chairman. In 1892, he was given the Prohibition nomination for governor and the nomination for Senate in 1894. In 1890, he selected as chairman of the Nebraska state Prohibition Committee and served again from 1895 to 1896, and was later elected as a member of the National Prohibition Committee in 1892.

In 1895, the Nebraska Prohibition Party passed a resolution at its convention endorsing Bentley for the party's presidential nomination. At the 1896 Prohibition convention he supported the broad gauger faction that wanted to add women's suffrage and free silver to the party's platform, but after the narrow gauger faction defeated those attempts Bentley, John St. John, and Helen M. Gougar led a walkout of the broad gaugers and created the breakaway National Party and nominated a rival ticket with Bentley as president and James H. Southgate as vice president. Following the 1896 presidential election the majority of the National Party's members returned to the Prohibition Party, but Bentley remained in the party and served as the chairman of the Nebraska affiliate until his death.

=== Later life ===
On February 6, 1905, Bentley was visiting Los Angeles where he died from heart disease after being visited by an unknown woman and was found to be missing multiple valuables including his gold watch.

== Electoral history ==
Charles Eugene Bentley electoral history

1889 Nebraska Second Congressional district special election
Party	Candidate	Votes	%	±%
Republican	Gilbert L. Laws	27,775	54.77%	+1.39%
Democratic	C. D. Casper	21,123	41.65%	+5.10%
Prohibition	Charles Eugene Bentley	1,816	3.58%	−3.54%
Total votes		50,714	100.00%	

1892 Nebraska gubernatorial election
Party	Candidate	Votes	%	±%
Republican	Lorenzo Crounse	78,426	39.72%	+39.72%
People's Independent	Charles Van Wyck	68,617	34.75%	+34.75%
Democratic	Julius Sterling Morton	44,195	22.38%	+22.38%
Prohibition	Charles Eugene Bentley	6,235	3.16%	+3.16%
Write-in		1	0.00%	+0.00%
Total votes		197,474	100.00%	

1894 Nebraska Senate preferential vote
Party	Candidate	Votes	%	±%
Democratic	William Jennings Bryan	80,472	74.30%	+74.30%
Prohibition	Charles Eugene Bentley	25,594	23.63%	+23.63%
Republican	John Mellen Thurston	1,866	1.72%	+1.72%
Write-in		381	0.35%	+0.35%
Total votes		197,474	100.00%	
