= Matthew Maguire =

Matthew Maguire may refer to:

- Matt Maguire (born 1984), Australian rules footballer
- Matthew Maguire (labor activist), American labor activist
