= 1896 United States presidential election in New York =

- November 3, 1896
- Turnout: 84.3% ▼2.0 pp

Nominee	William McKinley	William Jennings Bryan
Party	Republican	Democratic
Home state	Ohio	Nebraska
Running mate	Garret Hobart	Arthur Sewall
Electoral vote	36	0
Popular vote	819,838	551,369
Percentage	57.58%	38.72%
County results
McKinley
50–60%
60–70%
70–80%
Bryan
50–60%
President before election
Grover Cleveland
Democratic
Elected President
William McKinley
Republican

The 1896 United States presidential election in New York took place on November 3, 1896. All contemporary 45 states were part of the 1896 United States presidential election. Voters chose 36 electors to the Electoral College, which selected the president and vice president.

New York was won by the Republican nominees, former Governor William McKinley of Ohio and his running mate corporate lawyer Garret Hobart of New Jersey. McKinley and Hobart defeated the Democratic nominees, former Congressman William Jennings Bryan of Nebraska and his running mate industrialist Arthur Sewall of Maine. Bryan also ran and received votes on the Populist Party line, with running mate Congressman Thomas E. Watson of Georgia.

Also in the running was the National Democratic Party (Gold Democrat) candidate, John M. Palmer of Illinois, who ran with former Governor of Kentucky Simon Bolivar Buckner on a platform advocating for the gold standard. McKinley carried New York State with 57.58% of the vote to Bryan's 38.72%, a victory margin of 18.85%. Palmer came in a distant third, with 1.33%. New York weighed in for this election as about fourteen percent more Republican than the national average.

Bryan, running on a platform of free silver, appealed strongly to Western miners and farmers in the 1896 election, but had little appeal in Northeastern states like New York. Consequently, he performed especially weakly for a Democrat in New York, losing every county in the state except for Schoharie County upstate. This included New York City, where McKinley outpolled Bryan by about 60,000 votes. McKinley thus became the first Republican nominee to win New York City. (Note: However, Bryan was not the first Democrat to lose New York City as the city had previously backed Zachary Taylor, a Whig, in 1848.) McKinley would lose New York City to Bryan in their 1900 rematch four years later after the city was consolidated.

This election would begin the Fourth Party System, which would last from 1896 to 1928, during which New York would become a reliably Republican state in all but the 1912 election.

== Results ==
1896 United States presidential election in New York
Party	Candidate	Running mate	Popular vote		Electoral vote	
Party	Candidate	Running mate	Count	%	Count	%
Republican	William McKinley of Ohio	Garret Hobart of New Jersey	819,838	57.58%	36	100.00%
Democratic	William Jennings Bryan of Nebraska	Arthur Sewall of Maine	551,369	38.72%	0	0.00%
National Democratic	John M. Palmer of Illinois	Simon Bolivar Buckner of Kentucky	18,950	1.33%	0	0.00%
Socialist Labor	Charles H. Matchett of New York	Matthew Maguire of New Jersey	17,667	1.24%	0	0.00%
Prohibition	Joshua Levering of Maryland	Hale Johnson of Illinois	16,052	1.13%	0	0.00%
Total			1,423,876	100.00%	36	100.00%

=== Results by county ===
County	William McKinley Republican		William Jennings Bryan Democratic		John M. Palmer National Democratic		Charles H. Matchett Socialist Labor		Joshua Levering Prohibition		Margin		Total votes cast
County	#	%	#	%	#	%	#	%	#	%	#	%	Total votes cast
Albany	22,263	54.52%	17,818	43.64%	359	0.88%	187	0.46%	207	0.51%	4,445	10.89%	40,834
Allegany	7,079	61.51%	3,895	33.85%	83	0.72%	4	0.03%	447	3.88%	3,184	27.67%	11,508
Broome	10,630	63.75%	5,461	32.75%	128	0.77%	9	0.05%	446	2.67%	5,169	31.00%	16,674
Cattaraugus	9,337	58.76%	6,088	38.32%	90	0.57%	12	0.08%	362	2.28%	3,249	20.45%	15,889
Cayuga	10,024	61.38%	5,846	35.80%	143	0.88%	30	0.18%	287	1.76%	4,178	25.58%	16,330
Chautauqua	14,325	66.61%	6,581	30.60%	135	0.63%	17	0.08%	449	2.09%	7,744	36.01%	21,507
Chemung	7,926	58.34%	5,259	38.71%	92	0.68%	19	0.14%	290	2.13%	2,667	19.63%	13,586
Chenango	6,338	59.09%	3,973	37.04%	104	0.97%	14	0.13%	297	2.77%	2,365	22.05%	10,726
Clinton	6,005	65.35%	3,074	33.45%	54	0.59%	12	0.13%	44	0.48%	2,931	31.90%	9,189
Columbia	6,654	58.46%	4,373	38.42%	177	1.56%	3	0.03%	175	1.54%	2,281	20.04%	11,382
Cortland	4,939	63.39%	2,574	33.04%	55	0.71%	1	0.01%	222	2.85%	2,365	30.36%	7,791
Delaware	7,790	61.75%	4,450	35.28%	94	0.75%	9	0.07%	272	2.16%	3,340	26.48%	12,615
Dutchess	12,127	62.44%	6,634	34.16%	244	1.26%	30	0.15%	387	1.99%	5,493	28.28%	19,422
Erie	45,612	58.57%	30,172	38.74%	1,124	1.44%	508	0.65%	463	0.59%	15,440	19.83%	77,879
Essex	5,356	74.24%	1,760	24.40%	56	0.78%	4	0.06%	38	0.53%	3,596	49.85%	7,214
Franklin	6,118	69.29%	2,490	28.20%	64	0.72%	14	0.16%	143	1.62%	3,628	41.09%	8,829
Fulton (Note: Not including the votes from Hamilton County, which have been separated below.)	7,040	64.36%	3,338	30.51%	114	1.04%	73	0.67%	374	3.42%	3,702	33.84%	10,939
Genesee	5,190	61.50%	3,004	35.60%	55	0.65%	9	0.11%	181	2.14%	2,186	25.90%	8,439
Greene	4,540	53.46%	3,688	43.43%	88	1.04%	18	0.21%	158	1.86%	852	10.03%	8,492
Hamilton (Note: Hamilton County voted with Fulton County. The figures for Hamilton County are reckoned by subtracting the Fulton County results, given in the 12/10/1896 Fulton County Republican, from the combined Fulton/Hamilton results given in the 1897 Manual.)	664	55.15%	511	42.44%	13	1.08%	0	0.00%	16	1.33%	153	12.71%	1,204
Herkimer	8,096	59.77%	5,027	37.11%	151	1.11%	10	0.07%	261	1.93%	3,069	22.66%	13,545
Jefferson	11,411	60.88%	6,644	35.45%	176	0.94%	6	0.03%	507	2.70%	4,767	25.43%	18,744
Kings	109,135	56.35%	76,882	39.70%	3,715	1.92%	3,481	1.80%	463	0.24%	32,253	16.65%	193,676
Lewis	4,461	58.70%	3,042	40.03%	51	0.67%	5	0.07%	88	1.15%	1,419	18.56%	7,647
Livingston	5,461	55.18%	4,101	41.44%	73	0.74%	4	0.04%	257	2.60%	1,360	13.74%	9,896
Madison	7,588	65.56%	3,580	30.93%	106	0.92%	32	0.28%	268	2.32%	4,008	34.63%	11,574
Monroe	26,288	58.66%	17,158	38.28%	395	0.88%	466	1.04%	511	1.14%	9,130	20.37%	44,818
Montgomery	7,082	58.39%	4,759	39.24%	141	1.16%	36	0.30%	111	0.92%	2,323	19.15%	12,129
New York	156,359	50.73%	135,624	44.00%	5,541	1.80%	10,025	3.25%	683	0.22%	20,735	6.73%	308,232
Niagara	8,626	55.69%	6,441	41.58%	143	0.92%	13	0.08%	267	1.72%	2,185	14.11%	15,490
Oneida	18,855	60.81%	11,003	35.49%	468	1.51%	161	0.52%	520	1.68%	7,852	25.32%	31,007
Onondaga	25,032	62.36%	13,695	34.12%	296	0.74%	713	1.78%	405	1.01%	11,337	28.24%	40,141
Ontario	7,506	56.30%	5,485	41.14%	126	0.95%	9	0.07%	206	1.55%	2,021	15.16%	13,332
Orange	14,086	59.52%	8,971	37.91%	249	1.05%	57	0.24%	304	1.28%	5,115	21.61%	23,667
Orleans	4,664	58.97%	2,993	37.84%	33	0.42%	6	0.08%	213	2.69%	1,671	21.13%	7,909
Oswego	11,411	62.81%	6,401	35.23%	95	0.52%	3	0.02%	258	1.42%	5,010	27.58%	18,168
Otsego	8,161	56.37%	5,820	40.20%	166	1.15%	9	0.06%	321	2.22%	2,341	16.17%	14,477
Putnam	2,364	67.64%	1,027	29.38%	53	1.52%	9	0.26%	42	1.20%	1,337	38.25%	3,495
Queens	18,694	58.03%	11,980	37.19%	633	1.97%	774	2.40%	132	0.41%	6,714	20.84%	32,213
Rensselaer	17,221	55.71%	13,119	42.44%	208	0.67%	92	0.30%	274	0.89%	4,102	13.27%	30,914
Richmond	6,170	55.10%	4,452	39.76%	293	2.62%	138	1.23%	145	1.29%	1,718	15.34%	11,198
Rockland	4,336	56.95%	3,002	39.43%	156	2.05%	11	0.14%	109	1.43%	1,334	17.52%	7,614
Saratoga	9,638	63.57%	4,987	32.89%	157	1.04%	17	0.11%	362	2.39%	4,651	30.68%	15,161
Schenectady	4,903	55.05%	3,711	41.66%	103	1.16%	75	0.84%	115	1.29%	1,192	13.38%	8,907
Schoharie	3,838	46.58%	4,203	51.01%	60	0.73%	4	0.05%	135	1.64%	-365	-4.43%	8,240
Schuyler	2,692	59.89%	1,619	36.02%	37	0.82%	1	0.02%	146	3.25%	1,073	23.87%	4,495
Seneca	3,853	53.53%	3,213	44.64%	54	0.75%	3	0.04%	75	1.04%	640	8.89%	7,198
St. Lawrence	15,287	70.97%	5,749	26.69%	123	0.57%	5	0.02%	377	1.75%	9,538	44.28%	21,541
Steuben	12,858	59.47%	7,971	36.87%	118	0.55%	18	0.08%	657	3.04%	4,887	22.60%	21,622
Suffolk	9,388	66.60%	3,872	27.47%	367	2.60%	61	0.43%	409	2.90%	5,516	39.13%	14,097
Sullivan	4,589	58.35%	3,073	39.08%	86	1.09%	10	0.13%	106	1.35%	1,516	19.28%	7,864
Tioga	4,849	61.06%	2,824	35.56%	40	0.50%	4	0.05%	224	2.82%	2,025	25.50%	7,941
Tompkins	5,342	58.07%	3,506	38.11%	103	1.12%	9	0.10%	240	2.61%	1,836	19.96%	9,200
Ulster	11,100	56.31%	8,140	41.30%	143	0.73%	12	0.06%	316	1.60%	2,960	15.02%	19,711
Warren	4,685	65.51%	2,269	31.73%	69	0.96%	7	0.10%	122	1.71%	2,416	33.78%	7,152
Washington	8,139	69.12%	3,239	27.51%	133	1.13%	4	0.03%	260	2.21%	4,900	41.61%	11,775
Wayne	8,039	63.81%	4,254	33.77%	77	0.61%	8	0.06%	220	1.75%	3,785	30.04%	12,598
Westchester	19,337	59.62%	11,752	36.23%	643	1.98%	388	1.20%	314	0.97%	7,585	23.39%	32,434
Wyoming	4,967	62.28%	2,706	33.93%	67	0.84%	5	0.06%	230	2.88%	2,261	28.35%	7,975
Yates	3,370	59.86%	2,086	37.05%	30	0.53%	3	0.05%	141	2.50%	1,284	22.81%	5,630
Totals	819,838	57.58%	551,369	38.72%	18,950	1.33%	17,667	1.24%	16,052	1.13%	268,469	18.85%	1,423,876

==== Counties that flipped from Democratic to Republican ====
- Albany
- Columbia
- Erie
- Hamilton
- Kings
- New York
- Niagara
- Queens
- Rensselaer
- Richmond
- Rockland
- Schenectady
- Seneca
- Ulster
- Westchester

== See also ==
- United States presidential elections in New York
- Presidency of William McKinley
