= 1896 United States presidential election =

Election of William McKinley

- November 3, 1896

447 members of the Electoral College 224 electoral votes needed to win
- Turnout: 79.6% (▲3.8 pp)

Nominee	William McKinley	William Jennings Bryan
Party	Republican	Democratic
Alliance		Parties: Populist; Silver; Silver Republican
Home state	Ohio	Nebraska
Running mate	Garret Hobart	Arthur Sewall (Democratic, Silver); Thomas E. Watson (Populist)
Electoral vote	271	176
States carried	23	22
Popular vote	7,112,138	6,510,807
Percentage	51.0%	46.7%
- Presidential election results map. Red denotes states won by McKinley/Hobart, blue denotes those won by Bryan/Sewall and the Democratic/Populist ticket of Bryan/Watson. Numbers indicate the number of electoral votes allotted to each state.
President before election
Grover Cleveland
Democratic
Elected President
William McKinley
Republican

A presidential election was held in the United States on November 3, 1896. Former Governor William McKinley, the Republican nominee, defeated former Representative William Jennings Bryan, the Democratic nominee. The 1896 campaign, which took place during an economic depression known as the Panic of 1893, was a political realignment that ended the old Third Party System and began the Fourth Party System.

Incumbent Democratic President Grover Cleveland did not seek election to a second consecutive term (which would have been his third overall), leaving the Democratic nomination open. An attorney and former congressman, Bryan galvanized support with his Cross of Gold speech, which called for reform of the monetary system and attacked business leaders as the cause of ongoing economic depression. The 1896 Democratic National Convention repudiated the Cleveland administration and nominated Bryan on the fifth presidential ballot. Bryan then won the nomination of the Populist Party, which had won several states in 1892 and shared many of Bryan's policies. In opposition to Bryan, some conservative Bourbon Democrats formed the National Democratic Party and nominated Senator John M. Palmer. McKinley prevailed by a wide margin on the first ballot at the 1896 Republican National Convention.

Since the onset of the Panic of 1893, the nation had been mired in a deep economic depression, marked by low prices, low profits, high unemployment, and violent strikes. Economic issues, especially tariff policy and the question of whether the gold standard should be preserved for the money supply, were central issues. McKinley forged a conservative coalition in which businessmen, professionals, prosperous farmers, and skilled factory workers turned off by Bryan's agrarian policies were heavily represented. He was strongest in cities and in the Northeast, Upper Midwest, and Pacific Coast. Republican campaign manager Mark Hanna pioneered many modern campaign techniques, facilitated by a $3.5 million budget. Bryan presented his campaign as a crusade of the working man against the rich, who impoverished America by limiting the money supply. He said that silver was in ample supply and if coined into money would restore prosperity while undermining the illicit power of the money trust. Bryan was strongest in the South, rural Midwest, and Rocky Mountain states. His moralistic rhetoric and crusade for inflation (to be generated by the institution of bimetallism) alienated conservatives.

Bryan campaigned vigorously throughout the swing states of the Midwest, while McKinley conducted a front porch campaign. At the end of an intensely heated contest, McKinley won a majority of the popular and electoral vote. Bryan won 46.7% of the popular vote and Palmer just under 1%. Turnout was very high, passing 90% of the eligible voters in many places. McKinley became the first Republican to ever carry Kentucky in a presidential election, thereby breaking into the Solid South; while Bryan became the first Democrat to ever carry Nebraska and Kansas, as well as several other Western states that had only recently been admitted to the Union, in a presidential election. The Democratic Party's repudiation of its Bourbon faction largely gave Bryan and his supporters control of the party until the 1920s and set the stage for Republican domination of the Fourth Party System. The four elections from 1884 to 1896 saw the incumbent party defeated each time; the only other such streak was from 1840 to 1852.

== Nominations ==
=== Republican Party nomination ===
McKinley/Hobart campaign poster

Republican Party (United States) 1896 Republican Party ticket
William McKinley	Garret Hobart
for President	for Vice President
39th Governor of Ohio (1892–1896)	24th President of the New Jersey Senate (1881–1882)
Campaign

==== Other candidates ====
Thomas B. Reed	Matthew S. Quay	Levi P. Morton	William B. Allison	Charles F. Manderson	Shelby M. Cullom
38th Speaker of the House from Maine (1895–1899)	U.S. Senator from Pennsylvania (1887–1899)	22nd Vice President of the United States (1889–1893)	U.S. Senator from Iowa (1873–1908)	U.S. Senator from Nebraska (1883–1895)	U.S. Senator from Illinois (1883–1913)

Following the defeat of former President Benjamin Harrison at the 1892 election, Ohio governor William McKinley rapidly became the overwhelming favorite to be the party's nominee in 1896, having finished a strong third behind Harrison and veteran candidate James G. Blaine (who had passed away not long after the election) at the party's 1892 convention. The only likely impediment to McKinley's candidacy was seen to be a possible comeback attempt by Harrison, but Harrison made it clear in early 1896 that he had no intention of making a third presidential run, and endorsed McKinley. At their convention in St. Louis, Missouri, held between June 16 and 18, 1896, the Republicans nominated McKinley for president and New Jersey's Garret Hobart for vice president. McKinley had just vacated the office of governor of Ohio. Both candidates were easily nominated on first ballots.

McKinley's campaign manager, the wealthy and talented Ohio businessman Mark Hanna, visited the leaders of large corporations and major, influential banks after the Republican Convention to raise funds for the campaign. With many businessmen and bankers terrified of Bryan's populist rhetoric and demand for the end of the gold standard, Hanna had little difficulty raising record amounts of money. He raised $3.5 million for the campaign and outspent the Democrats by an estimated 5-to-1 margin. McKinley was the last veteran of the American Civil War to be nominated for president by either major party, and indeed the last Civil War veteran to be on a major party's presidential ticket in any capacity (Henry G. Davis, the Democratic vice-presidential candidate in 1904, took part in the Union war effort, but in a non-combat role).

Presidential Nominating Ballot			Vice-Presidential Nominating Ballot		
	1st	Unanimous		1st	Unanimous
William McKinley	661.5	924	Garret A. Hobart	535.5	924
Thomas Brackett Reed	84.5		H. Clay Evans	277.5	
Matthew S. Quay	61.5		Morgan Bulkeley	39	
Levi P. Morton	58		James A. Walker	24	
William B. Allison	35.5		Charles W. Lippitt	8	
James D. Cameron	1		Thomas Brackett Reed	3	
Not Voting	20		Chauncey Depew	3	
Do nothing	661.5		John Mellen Thurston	2	
			Frederick Dent Grant	2	
			Levi P. Morton	1	
			Not Voting	29	

=== Democratic Party nomination ===
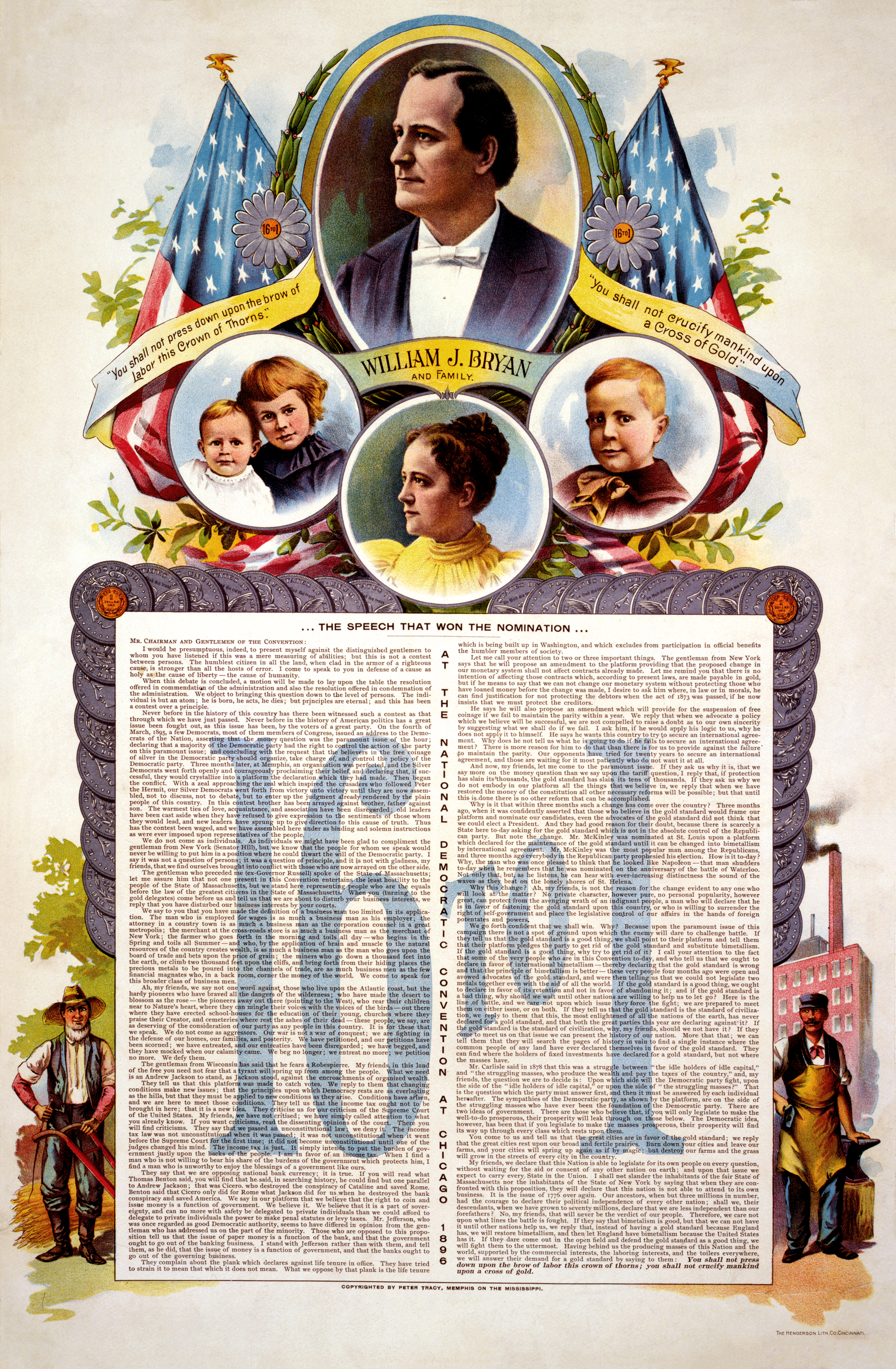
Bryan's famous "cross of gold" speech gave him the presidential nomination and swung the party to the silver cause

Democratic Party (United States) 1896 Democratic Party ticket
William Jennings Bryan	Arthur Sewall
for President	for Vice President
U.S. Representative for Nebraska's 1st (1891–1895)	President of the Maine Central Railroad (1884–1893)
Campaign

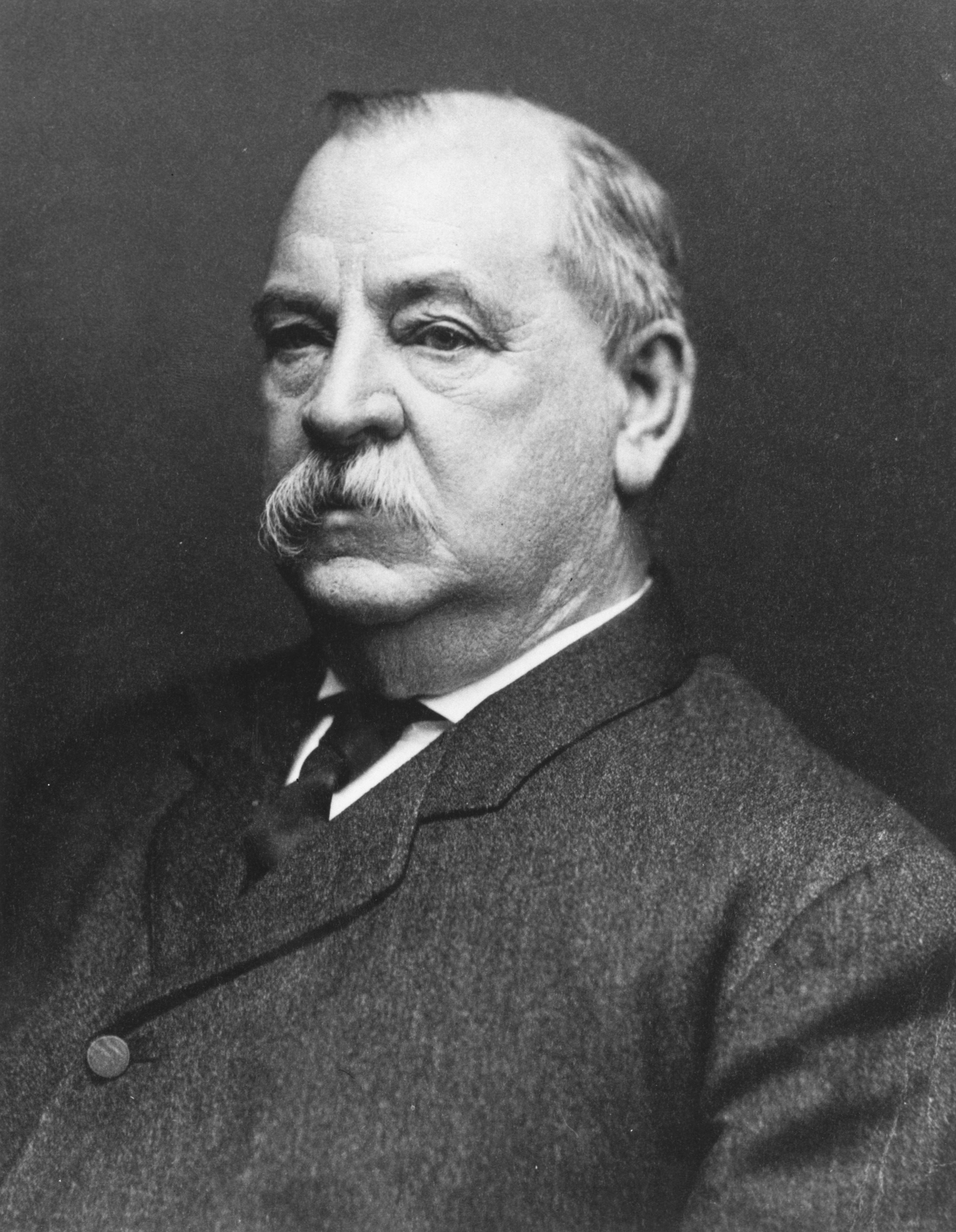
Grover Cleveland, the incumbent president in 1896, whose second non-consecutive term expired on March 4, 1897

==== Other candidates ====
Candidates in this section are sorted by their highest vote count on the nominating ballots, then by reverse date of withdrawal
Richard P. Bland	Robert E. Pattison	Joseph Blackburn	Horace Boies	John R. McLean
U.S. Representative from Missouri (1873–1895)	19th Governor of Pennsylvania (1891–1895)	United States Senator from Kentucky (1885–1897)	14th Governor of Iowa (1890–1894)	Publisher of The Cincinnati Enquirer from Ohio (1881–1916)
291 votes	100 votes	82 votes	67 votes	54 votes
Claude Matthews	Benjamin Tillman	Sylvester Pennoyer	Henry M. Teller	William Russell
23rd Governor of Indiana (1893–1897)	United States Senator from South Carolina (1895–1918)	8th Governor of Oregon (1887–1895)	United States Senator from Colorado (1885–1909)	37th Governor of Massachusetts (1891–1894)
37 votes	17 votes	8 votes	8 votes	W: June 20; 2 votes
William R. Morrison	John W. Daniel	Stephen M. White	Grover Cleveland	
U.S. Representative from Illinois (1873–1887)	United States Senator from Virginia (1887–1910)	United States Senator from California (1893–1899)	22nd and 24th President of the United States from New York (1885–1889; 1893–1897)	
W: June 19	DTBN	DTBN	DTBN	

One month after McKinley's nomination, supporters of silver-backed currency took control of the Democratic convention, held in Chicago on July 7–11. Most of the Southern and Western delegates were committed to implementing the Populist Party's "free silver" ideas. The convention repudiated Cleveland's gold standard policies and Cleveland himself. This left the convention wide open: there was no obvious successor to Cleveland. A two-thirds vote was required for the nomination and the silverites had it in spite of the extreme regional polarization of the delegates. In a test vote on an anti-silver measure, the Eastern states (from Maryland to Maine), with 28% of the delegates, voted 96% in favor. The other delegates voted 91% against, so the silverites could count on a majority of 67% of the delegates.

The attorney, former congressman, and unsuccessful Senate candidate William Jennings Bryan filled the void. A superb orator, Bryan hailed from Nebraska and spoke for farmers suffering from the economic depression following the Panic of 1893. At the convention, he gave what has been considered one of the greatest political speeches in American history, the "Cross of Gold" Speech. Bryan presented a passionate defense of farmers and factory workers struggling to survive the economic depression, and attacked big-city business owners and leaders as the cause of much of their suffering. He called for reform of the monetary system, an end to the gold standard, and government relief efforts for farmers and others hurt by the depression. Bryan's speech was so dramatic that many delegates carried him on their shoulders around the convention hall afterward.

The next day, eight names were placed in nomination: Richard Bland, William J. Bryan, Claude Matthews, Horace Boies, Joseph Blackburn, John R. McLean, Robert E. Pattison, and Sylvester Pennoyer. Despite a strong initial showing by Bland, who led on the first three ballots, Bryan's speech helped him gain the momentum required to win the nomination, which he did on the fifth ballot, after most of the other candidates withdrew in his favor.

After Bland's defeat, his supporters attempted to nominate him as Bryan's running mate, but Bland was more interested in winning back his former seat in the House of Representatives, and so withdrew his name from consideration despite leading the early rounds of voting. Arthur Sewall, a wealthy shipbuilder from Maine, was eventually chosen as the vice-presidential nominee. It was felt that Sewall's wealth might encourage him to help pay some campaign expenses. At just 36, Bryan was only a year older than required by the Constitution to be president. He remains the youngest person ever nominated for president by a major party.

Presidential Nominating Ballots (1 Thru 5)							Vice-Presidential Nominating Ballots (1 Thru 5)						
	1st	2nd	3rd	4th	5th	Unanimous		1st	2nd	3rd	4th	5th	Unanimous
William J. Bryan	137	197	219	280	652	930	Arthur Sewall	100	37	97	261	568	930
Richard P. Bland	235	281	291	241	11		John R. McLean	111	158	210	298	32	
Robert E. Pattison	97	100	97	97	95		Richard P. Bland	62	294	255	0	0	
Joseph Blackburn	82	41	27	27	0		Joseph C. Sibley	163	113	50	0	0	
Horace Boies	67	37	36	33	0		George F. Williams	76	16	15	9	9	
John R. McLean	54	53	54	46	0		John W. Daniel	11	0	6	54	36	
Claude Matthews	37	34	34	36	0		Walter Clark	50	22	22	46	22	
Benjamin Tillman	17	0	0	0	0		James R. Williams	22	13	0	0	0	
Adlai E. Stevenson	6	10	9	8	8		William F. Harrity	19	21	19	11	11	
Sylvester Pennoyer	8	8	0	0	0		Joseph Blackburn	20	0	0	0	0	
Henry M. Teller	8	8	0	0	0		Horace Boies	20	0	0	0	0	
William E. Russell	2	0	0	0	0		J. Hamilton Lewis	11	0	0	0	0	
David B. Hill	1	1	1	1	1		Robert E. Pattison	2	1	1	1	1	
James E. Campbell	1	0	0	0	0		George W. Fithian	1	0	0	0	0	
David Turpie	0	0	0	0	1		Henry M. Teller	1	0	0	0	0	
Not Voting	178	160	162	161	162		Stephen M. White	1	0	0	0	0	
							Not Voting	260	255	255	250	251	

Presidential Nominating Ballots In Detail			Vice-Presidential Nominating Ballots In Detail		
1st	2nd	3rd	1st	2nd	3rd
4th	5th		4th	5th	

=== Third parties and independents ===
==== People's Party nomination ====
1896 People's Party ticket
William Jennings Bryan	Thomas E. Watson
for President	for Vice President
U.S. Representative for Nebraska's 1st (1891–1895)	U.S. Representative for Georgia's 10th (1891–1893)

===== Other candidates =====
Candidates in this section are sorted by their highest vote count on the nominating ballots
Seymour F. Norton	Eugene V. Debs	Jacob S. Coxey
Writer and Philanthropist from Illinois	Trade Unionist and Labor leader from Indiana	Businessman and Political activist from Ohio
321 votes	DTBN; 8 votes	1 votes

Of the several third parties active in 1896, by far the most prominent was the People's Party. Formed in 1892, the Populists represented the philosophy of agrarianism (derived from Jeffersonian democracy), which held that farming was a superior way of life that was being exploited by bankers and middlemen. The Populists attracted cotton farmers in the South and wheat farmers in the West, but significantly few farmers in the Northeast and rural Midwest. In the presidential election of 1892, Populist candidate James B. Weaver carried four states, and in 1894, the Populists scored victories in congressional and state legislature races in a number of Southern and Western states. In the Southern states, including Alabama, North Carolina, Tennessee, and Texas, the wins were obtained by electoral fusion with the Republicans against the dominant Bourbon Democrats, whereas in the rest of the country, fusion, if practiced, was typically undertaken with the Democrats, as in the state of Washington. By 1896, some Populists believed that they could replace the Democrats as the main opposition party to the Republicans. However, the Democrats' nomination of Bryan, who supported many Populist goals and ideas, placed the party in a dilemma. Torn between choosing their own presidential candidate or supporting Bryan, the party leadership decided that nominating their own candidate would simply divide the forces of reform and hand the election to the more conservative Republicans. At their national convention in 1896, the Populists chose Bryan as their presidential nominee. However, to demonstrate that they were still independent from the Democrats, the Populists also chose former Georgia Representative Thomas E. Watson as their vice-presidential candidate instead of Arthur Sewall. Bryan eagerly accepted the Populist nomination, but was vague as to whether, if elected, he would choose Watson as his vice-president instead of Sewall. With this election, the Populists began to be absorbed into the Democratic Party; within a few elections the party would disappear completely. The 1896 election was particularly detrimental to the Populist Party in the South; the party divided itself between members who favored cooperation with the Democrats to achieve reform at the national level and members who favored cooperation with the Republicans to achieve reform at a state level.

Bryan's Democratic and Populist supporters organized joint "fusion" tickets in several states with pledged electors drawn from both parties. The New York Times counted seventy-one Populist and six Silver Republican electoral candidates pledged to Bryan. In ten states where the fusion ticket was successful, twenty-seven electors voted for Bryan for president and Watson for vice president. (The remainder of Bryan's 176 electors, including the Populist and Silver Republican electors from Colorado and Idaho, voted for Sewall.)

Presidential Ballot		Vice Presidential Ballot	
William Jennings Bryan	1,042	Thomas E. Watson	469.5
Seymour F. Norton	321	Arthur Sewall	257.5
Eugene V. Debs	8		
Ignatius L. Donnelly	3		
Jacob S. Coxey	1		

==== Prohibition Party nomination ====
1896 Prohibition Party ticket
Joshua Levering	Hale Johnson
for President	for Vice President
Baptist leader and businessman from Maryland	Former Mayor of Newton, Illinois

===== Other candidates =====
Louis C. Hughes	Charles E. Bentley
11th Governor of the Arizona Territory (1893–1896)	Party State Chairman from Nebraska (1895–1896)
W:On First Ballot	DTBN

The Prohibition Party went into the convention divided into two factions, each unwilling to give ground or compromise with the other. The "Broad-Gauge" wing, led by Charles Bentley and former Kansas Governor John St. John, demanded the inclusion of planks endorsing the free coinage of silver at 16:1 and of women's suffrage, the former refusing to accept the nomination if such amendments to the party platform were not approved. The "Narrow-Gauge" wing, led by Samuel Dickie of Michigan and rallying around the candidacy of Joshua Levering, demanded that the party platform remain dedicated exclusively to the prohibition of alcohol. Conflict between the two sides soon broke out over the nomination of a permanent chairman, with a number of presented candidates for the position withdrawing before Oliver Stewart of Illinois, a "Broad-Gauger", was nominated. A minority report by St. John supported the free coinage of silver, government control of railroads and telegraphs, an income tax and referendums, and was prevented from being tabled, giving "Broad-Gaugers" confidence, but a number of those who voted for the report were merely undecided or against gagging the report. After a majority of 188 brought the report forward, "Narrow-Gaugers" campaigned among wavering delegates of the Northeast and Midwest to convince them of the electoral consequences should it be adopted: that Party gains in states like New York would reverse overnight in the face of free coinage and populism. When St. John's report was brought up to a formal vote the margins had largely reversed; it was rejected, 492 to 310. With the silver delegates still in shock and St. John attempting to move for a reconsideration, Illinois "Narrow-Gaugers" moved to offer as a substitute to both the minority and majority reports a single-plank platform centered on Prohibition. A rising vote was taken in lieu of a roll call, with the "Narrow-Gauge" Platform winning the vote and being adopted.

In an attempt to mollify suffragists who were incensed at the lack of a plank endorsing women's suffrage, the plank itself was adopted through a resolution by the convention by a near unanimous vote. When it came to the nomination for president, many "Broad-Gaugers" were already openly considering bolting and running their own candidate as it became increasingly apparent that the "Narrow-Gaugers" had brought a majority of the convention under their influence. Formal action was deferred until after the nomination for president was made. With Charles Bentley refusing to be nominated under the single-plank platform, an attempt was made to nominate the recently retired governor of the Arizona Territory, Louis Hughes, but as it became apparent that Levering was set to receive the support of most of the delegates, they opted to withdraw Hughes's name. Once Levering's nomination was confirmed without any visible opposition, around 200 of those who were suffragists, silverites or populists bolted the convention, led by Bentley and St. John, and joined with the National Reform "Party" to create the National Party. Afterward, the convention unanimously nominated Hale Johnson of Illinois for vice president.

==== National Party nomination ====
1896 National Party ticket
Charles E. Bentley	James H. Southgate
for President	for Vice President
Party State Chairman from Nebraska (1895–1896)	Party State Chairman from North Carolina (1895–1896)

Initially known as the "National Reform Party", the convention itself started only a day before the Prohibition National Convention, also being held in Pittsburgh, Pennsylvania. Though initially only a gathering of eight or so delegates, it was hoped that any bolters from the Prohibition Party might find their way there and would support the nomination of Representative Joseph C. Sibley for president. A sizable bolt did indeed occur upon the nomination of Joshua Levering by the Prohibition Party to the presidency, with Charles E. Bentley and former Kansas governor John St. John leading a walkout of "Broad-Gaugers" from their convention, St. John himself exclaiming that the regular convention had been "...bought up by Wall Street." The two groups would reorganize as the "National Party" and swiftly nominated Charles Bentley for the presidency, with James Southgate, the State Chairman for the North Carolina Prohibition Party, as his running mate. The delegates approved the minority report that had been rejected at the Prohibitionist Convention calling for free coinage and greenbacks, government control of railroads and telegraphs, direct election of senators and the president, and an income tax among others.

==== Socialist Labor Party nomination ====
1896 Socialist Labor Party ticket
Charles Matchett	Matthew Maguire
for President	for Vice President
Labor leader from New York	Alderman in Paterson, New Jersey

The Socialist Labor Convention was held in New York City on July 9, 1896. The convention nominated Charles Matchett of New York and Matthew Maguire of New Jersey. Its platform favored reduction in hours of labor; possession by the federal government of mines, railroads, canals, telegraphs, and telephones; possession by municipalities of water-works, gas-works, and electric plants; the issue of money by the federal government alone; the employment of the unemployed by the public authorities; abolition of the veto power; abolition of the United States Senate; women's suffrage; and uniform criminal law throughout the Union.

==== Silver Party nomination ====
1896 Silver Party ticket
William Jennings Bryan	Arthur Sewall
for President	for Vice President
U.S. Representative for Nebraska's 1st (1891–1895)	Director of the Maine Central Railroad

The Silver Party was organized in 1892. Near the beginning of that year, U.S. senators from silver-producing states (Colorado, Idaho, Nevada, and Montana) began objecting to President Benjamin Harrison's economic policies and advocated the free coinage of silver. Senator Henry Teller notified the Senate that if the two major parties did not back down on their financial policies, the four western states would back a third party. The Portland Morning Oregonian reported on June 27, 1892, that a Silver Party was being organized along those lines.

Nevada silverites called a state convention to be held on June 5, 1892, just days following the close of the Democratic National Convention. The convention noted that neither the Republicans or Democrats addressed the silver concerns of western states and officially organized the "Silver Party of Nevada." Proceeding by itself, the Silver Party swept the state in 1892; James Weaver, the People's Party nominee for president running on the Silver ticket, won 66.8% of the vote. Francis Newlands was elected to the U.S. House with 72.5% of the vote. The Silverites took control of the legislature, assuring the election of William Stewart to the U.S. Senate.

The success of the Nevada silverites spurred their brethren in Colorado to action; the Colorado Silver Party never materialized, however.

In the 1894 midterm elections, the Silver Party remained a Nevada party. It swept all statewide offices, formerly held by Republicans. John Edward Jones was elected Governor with 50% of the vote; Newlands was re-elected with 44%.

Following the Democratic Party debacle in 1894, James Weaver began agitating for the creation of a nationwide Silver Party. He altered the People's Party platform from 1892 and eliminated planks he felt would be divisive for a larger party and began to lobby silver men around the nation. The first major statement by the national Silver Party was an address delivered to the American Bimetallic League, printed in the Emporia Daily Gazette on March 6, 1895. Letterhead for the nascent party promoted U.S. Representative Joseph Sibley of Pennsylvania for president, noting that his endorsement by the Prohibitionists would secure that party's support.

Silver leaders met in Washington DC on January 22 to discuss holding a national convention. They decided to wait until after the conventions of the two major parties in case one of them agreed to the 16:1 coinage demands. Just a few days later, however, party regulars convinced the leaders to change course. On January 29, the leaders issued a call for a national convention to be held in St. Louis on July 22. J.J. Mott, the Silver Party National Chairman, went to great lengths to organize state parties, but his efforts did not produce dramatic results. The Silver State convention in Ohio was attended by just 20 people, even though the president of the Bimetallic League, A.J. Warner, lived there.

Although most Silverites had been pushing the nomination of Senator Teller, the situation changed with the Democratic nomination of William Jennings Bryan. Congressman Newlands was in Chicago as the official Silver Party visitor, and he announced on July 10 that the Silver Party should endorse the Democratic ticket. Chairman Mott, who was in St. Louis making final arrangements for the Silver National Convention, told a reporter five days later "All the Silver Party wants is silver, and the Democratic platform will give us that." I.B. Stevens, a member of the executive committee, told a reporter that the Silver Party "will bring to the support of [Bryan] hundreds of thousands who do not wish to vote a Democratic ticket."

On July 25, both Bryan and Arthur Sewall would be nominated by acclamation.

==== National Democratic Party nomination ====
1896 National Democratic Party ticket
John M. Palmer	Simon Bolivar Buckner
for President	for Vice President
U.S. Senator from Illinois (1891–1897)	30th Governor of Kentucky (1887–1891)

===== Other candidates =====
Candidates in this section are sorted by their highest vote count on the nominating ballots, then by reverse date of withdrawal
Edward S. Bragg	Henry Watterson	James Broadhead	Daniel W. Lawler	Grover Cleveland
U.S. Ambassador to Mexico from Wisconsin (1888–1889)	U.S. Representative for Kentucky's 5th (1876–1877)	U.S. Representative for Missouri's 9th (1883–1885)	Attorney-at-Law from Minnesota	22nd and 24th U.S. President from New York (1885–1889; 1893–1897)
130.5 votes	W:On First Ballot	DTBN	DTBN	DTBN

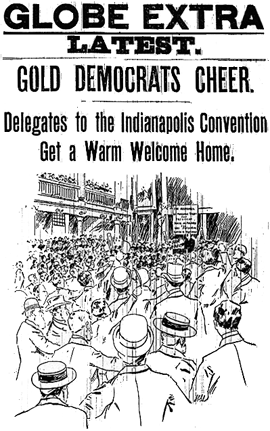
The National "Gold" Democratic Convention

The pro-gold Democrats reacted to Bryan's nomination with a mixture of anger, desperation, and confusion. A number of pro-gold Bourbon Democrats urged a "bolt" and the formation of a third party. In response, a hastily arranged assembly on July 24 organized the National Democratic Party. A follow-up meeting in August scheduled a nominating convention for September in Indianapolis and issued an appeal to fellow Democrats. In this document, the National Democratic Party portrayed itself as the legitimate heir to Presidents Jefferson, Jackson, and Cleveland.

Delegates from forty-one states gathered at the National Democratic Party's national nominating convention in Indianapolis on September 2. Some delegates planned to nominate Cleveland, but they relented after a telegram arrived stating that he would not accept. Senator William Freeman Vilas from Wisconsin, the main drafter of the National Democratic Party's platform, was a favorite of the delegates. However, Vilas refused to run as the party's sacrificial lamb. The choice instead was John M. Palmer, a 79-year-old former senator from Illinois. Simon Bolivar Buckner, a 73-year-old former governor of Kentucky, was nominated by acclamation for vice-president. The ticket, symbolic of post-Civil War reconciliation, featured the oldest combined age of the candidates in American history.

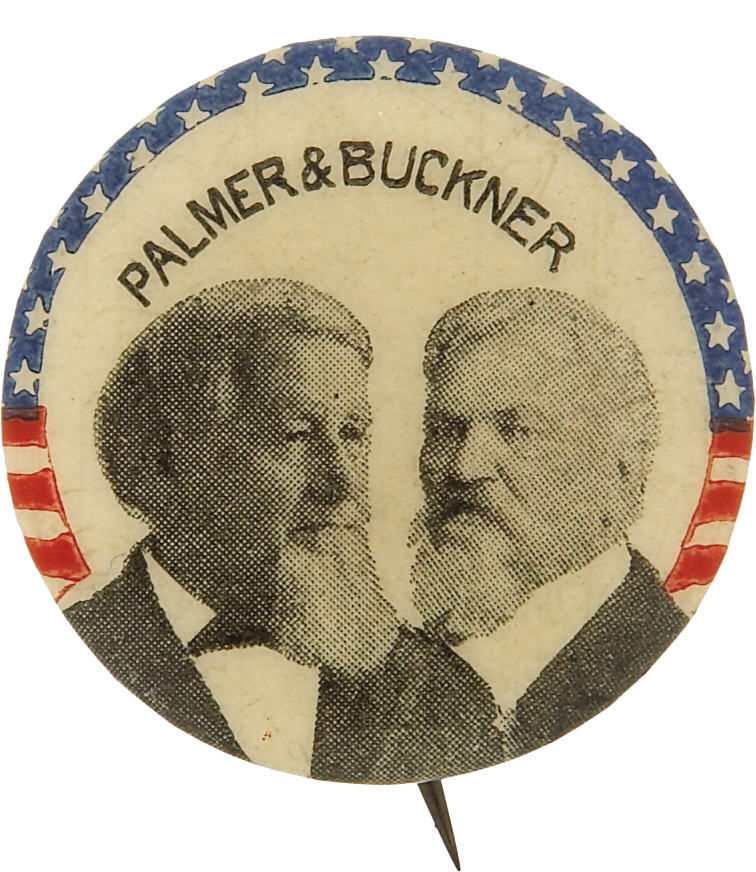
Palmer/Buckner campaign button

Despite their advanced ages, Palmer and Buckner embarked on a busy speaking tour, including visits to most major cities in the East. This won them considerable respect from the party faithful, although some found it hard to take the geriatric campaigning seriously. "You would laugh yourself sick could you see old Palmer," wrote lawyer Kenesaw Mountain Landis. "He has actually gotten it into his head he is running for office." The Palmer ticket was considered to be a vehicle to elect McKinley for some Gold Democrats, such as William Collins Whitney and Abram Hewitt, the treasurer of the National Democratic Party, and they received quiet financial support from Mark Hanna. Palmer himself said at a campaign stop that if "this vast crowd casts its vote for William McKinley next Tuesday, I shall charge them with no sin." There was even some cooperation with the Republican Party, especially in finances. The Republicans hoped that Palmer could draw enough Democratic votes from Bryan to tip marginal Midwestern and border states into McKinley's column. In a private letter, Hewitt underscored the "entire harmony of action" between both parties in standing against Bryan.

However, the National Democratic Party was not merely an adjunct to the McKinley campaign. An important goal was to nurture a loyal remnant for future victory. Repeatedly they depicted Bryan's prospective defeat, and a credible showing for Palmer, as paving the way for ultimate recapture of the Democratic Party, and this did indeed happen in 1904.

The Palmer-Buckner ticket remains the only third-party presidential campaign in history to have earned the endorsement of the New York Times.

Presidential ballot
Ballot	1st before shifts	1st after shifts
John M. Palmer	757.5	769.5
Edward S. Bragg	130.5	118.5

== Campaign strategies ==
While the Republican Party entered 1896 assuming that the Democrats were in shambles and victory would be easy, especially after the unprecedented Republican landslide in the congressional elections of 1894, the nationwide emotional response to the Bryan candidacy changed everything. By summer, it appeared that Bryan was ahead in the South and West and probably also in the Midwest. Bryan ran an aggressive campaign that appealed to lower-class Americans and evangelical Christians. He traveled 18,000 miles by train and made around 600 speeches across the country. He often displayed religious imagery at the site of his speeches. The content of his speeches revolved around progressive policies such as the free coinage of silver and progressive tax reform that appealed to lower-class Americans. On the other hand, McKinley's campaign was much quieter and did not attempt to copy the populist rhetoric that Bryan relied on. However, Bryan's rising popularity worried Republican campaign strategists. An entirely new strategy was called for by the McKinley campaign. It was designed to educate voters in the money issues, to demonstrate silverite fallacies, and to portray Bryan himself as a dangerous crusader. McKinley would be portrayed as the safe and sound champion of jobs and sound money, with his high tariff proposals guaranteed to return prosperity for everyone. The McKinley campaign would be national and centralized, using the Republican National Committee as the tool of the candidate, instead of the state parties' tool. Furthermore, the McKinley campaign stressed his pluralistic commitment to prosperity for all groups (including minorities).

=== Financing ===
The McKinley campaign invented a new form of campaign financing that has dominated American politics ever since. Instead of asking office holders to return a cut of their pay, Hanna went to financiers and industrialists and made a business proposition. He explained that Bryan would win if nothing happened, and that the McKinley team had a winning counterattack that would be very expensive. He then would ask them how much it was worth to the business not to have Bryan as president. He suggested an amount and was happy to take a check. Hanna had moved beyond partisanship and campaign rhetoric to a businessman's thinking about how to achieve a desired result. He raised $3.5 million. Hanna brought in banker Charles G. Dawes to run his Chicago office and spend about $2 million in the critical region. McKinley emulated Benjamin Harrison's 1888 front porch campaign and raised money from various interest and demographic groups from his home in Canton, Ohio. His strategy involved inviting numerous interest and demographic group delegates to his house and giving a short speech to these groups. His strategy led to McKinley earning enormous campaign funds, and he used this money to enlist 14,000 speakers to represent the McKinley campaign.

Meanwhile, traditional funders of the Democratic Party (mostly financiers from the Northeast) rejected Bryan, although he did manage to raise about $500,000. Some of it came from businessmen with interests in silver mining. Bryan never obtained the same amount of campaign funds as McKinley because his policies alienated Democratic donors who disagreed with his progressive policies. Without much campaign funds to spend, Bryan could not extend his political outreach and only relied on himself to speak for his policies.

The financial disparity grew larger and larger as the Republicans funded more and more rallies, speeches, and torchlight parades, as well as hundreds of millions of pamphlets attacking Bryan and praising McKinley. Lacking a systematic fund-raising system, Bryan was unable to tap his potential supporters, and he had to rely on passing the hat at rallies. National Chairman Jones pleaded, "No matter in how small sums, no matter by what humble contributions, let the friends of liberty and national honor contribute all they can."

=== Republican attacks on Bryan ===
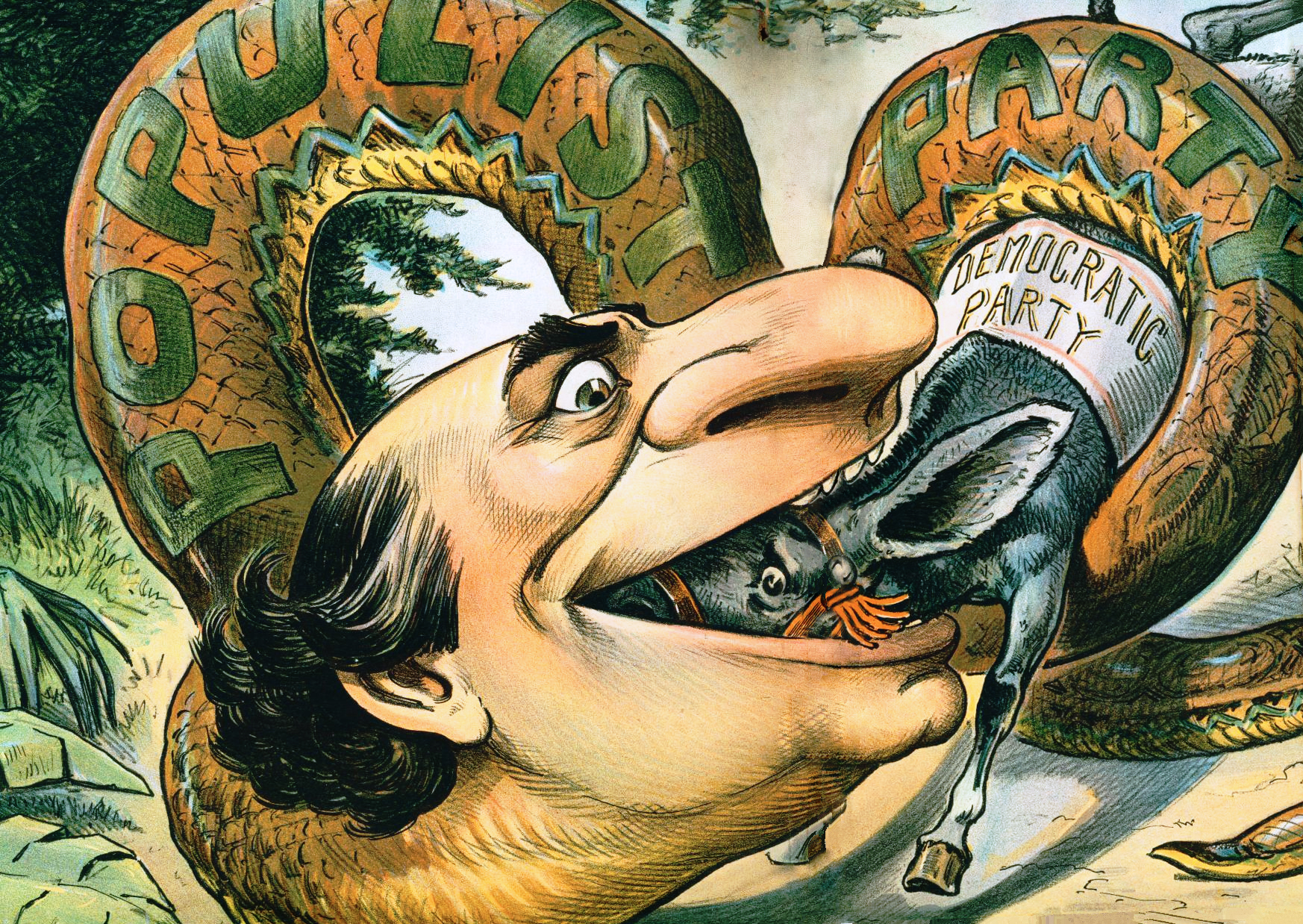
Conservatives said that Bryan (the Populist snake) was taking over (swallowing) the Democratic Party (the mule). Cartoon from Judge magazine, 1896.

Increasingly, the Republicans personalized their attacks on Bryan as a dangerous religious fanatic. The counter-crusading rhetoric focused on Bryan as a reckless revolutionary whose policies would destroy the economic system. Illinois Governor John Peter Altgeld was running for re-election after having pardoned several of the anarchists convicted in the Haymarket affair. Republican posters and speeches linked Altgeld and Bryan as two dangerous anarchists. The Republican Party tried any number of tactics to ridicule Bryan's economic policies. In one case they printed fake dollar bills which had Bryan's face and read "IN GOD WE TRUST ... FOR THE OTHER 53 CENTS", illustrating their claim that a dollar bill would be worth only 47 cents if it was backed by silver instead of gold.

=== Ethnic responses ===
The Democratic Party in Eastern and Midwestern cities had a strong German Catholic base that was alienated by free silver and inflationist panaceas. They showed little enthusiasm for Bryan, although many were worried that a Republican victory would bring prohibition into play. The Irish Catholics disliked Bryan's revivalistic rhetoric and worried about prohibition as well. However, their leaders decided to stick with Bryan, since the departure of so many Bourbon businessmen from the party left the Irish increasingly in control.

=== Labor unions and skilled workers ===
The Bryan campaign appealed first of all to farmers. It told urban workers that their return to prosperity was possible only if the farmers prospered first. Bryan made the point bluntly in the "Cross of Gold" speech, delivered in Chicago just 25 years after that city had indeed burned down: "Burn down your cities and leave our farms, and your cities will spring up again; but destroy our farms, and the grass will grow in the streets of every city in the country." Juxtaposing "our farms" and "your cities" did not go over well in cities; they voted 59% for McKinley. Among the industrial cities, Bryan carried only two (Troy, New York, and Fort Wayne, Indiana).

The main labor unions were reluctant to endorse Bryan because their members feared inflation. Railroad workers especially worried that Bryan's silver programs would bankrupt the railroads, which were in a shaky financial condition in the depression and whose bonds were payable in gold. Factory workers saw no advantage in inflation to help miners and farmers, because their urban cost of living would shoot up and they would be hurt. The McKinley campaign gave special attention to skilled workers, especially in the Midwest and adjacent states. Secret polls show that large majorities of railroad and factory workers voted for McKinley.

=== Influence of the 1896 campaigns ===
Campaign strategies of both sides changed how candidates campaign in elections in the United States, shifting presidential campaigns to be more candidate-focused and reliant on campaign messaging to attract donors. Bryan's campaign was influential because of the populist messaging that Bryan presented in his speeches nationwide. Even though Bryan did not have the same amount of campaign funds as McKinley, his messaging was impactful enough to earn a significant electoral vote, and he only needed a few more states to win the election. McKinley's campaign was influential because of how he earned and used his campaign funds to undermine Bryan's campaign. The front porch strategy was an excellent success for McKinley as he earned massive amounts of campaign funds from donors. Additionally, the way McKinley used the funds to attack Bryan's campaign produced the intended effect of Americans viewing Bryan as a religious fanatic whose policies threatened to ruin the economy. The outcome of the 1896 election shifted party coalitions as Republicans maintained strong relationships with businesses, professionals, skilled workers, and wealthy farmers. Unfortunately for Democrats, they were not able to produce a coalition of lower-class farmers, unskilled laborers, and white southerners.

== The fall campaign ==
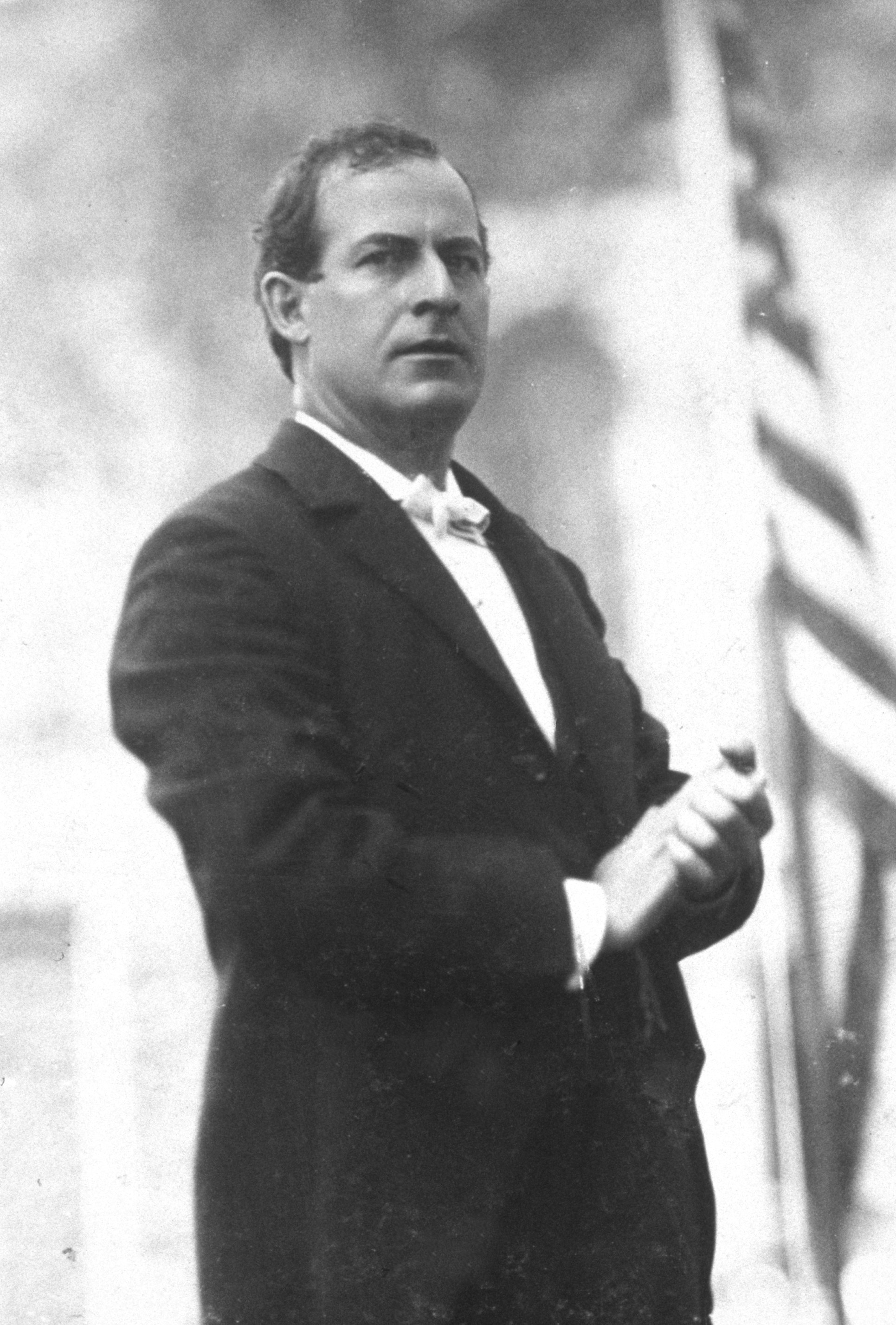
Bryan's imposing voice and height made a deep impression on many who thronged to hear him.

Throughout the campaign the South and Mountain states appeared certain to vote for Bryan, whereas the East was certain for McKinley. In play were the Midwest and the Border States.

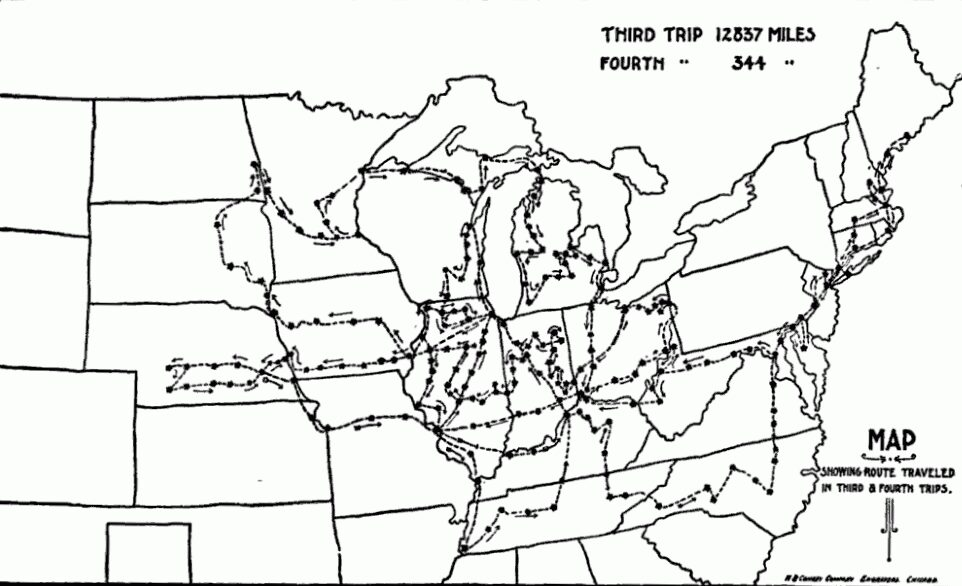
Bryan traveled 18,000 miles in 3 months, concentrating on the critical states of the Midwest.

The Republican Party amassed an unprecedented war chest at all levels: national, state and local. Outspent and shut out of the party's traditional newspapers, Bryan decided his best chance to win the election was to conduct a national speaking tour by train. His rhetoric to huge audiences would make his campaign a story that the hostile press would have to cover, and he could speak to the voters directly instead of through editorials. He was the first presidential candidate since Stephen Douglas in 1860 to canvass directly, and the first ever to criss-cross the nation and meet voters in person.

The novelty of seeing a visiting presidential candidate, combined with Bryan's spellbinding oratory and the passion of his believers, generated huge crowds. Silverites welcomed their hero with all-day celebrations of parades, band music, picnic meals, endless speeches, and undying demonstrations of support. Bryan focused his efforts on the Midwest, which everyone agreed would be the decisive battleground in the election. In just 100 days, Bryan gave over 500 speeches to several million people. His record was 36 speeches in one day in St. Louis. Relying on just a few hours of sleep a night, he traveled 18,000 miles by rail to address five million people, often in a hoarse voice; he would explain that he left his real voice at the previous stops where it was still rallying the people.

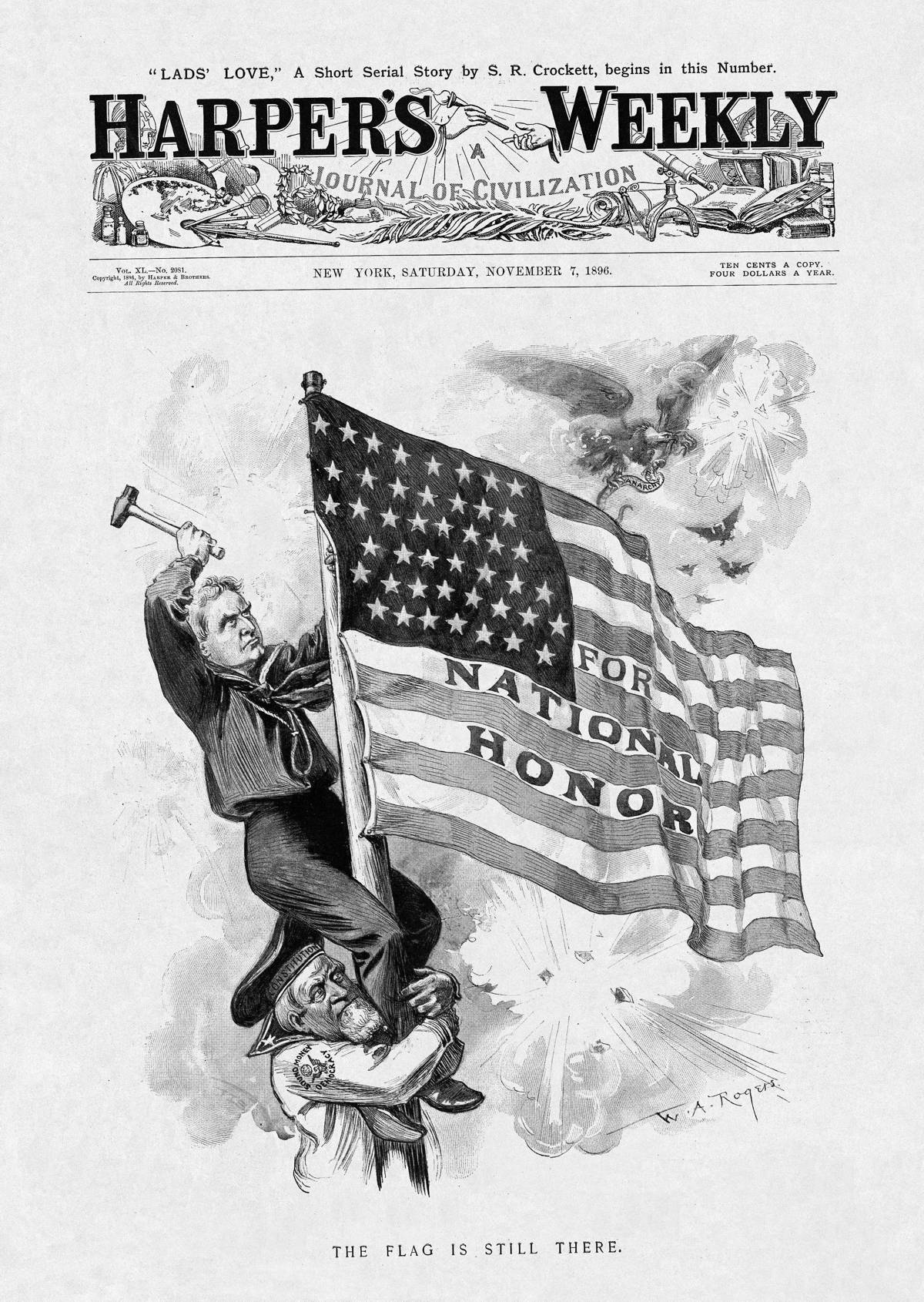
The National "Gold" Democratic Party undercut Bryan by dividing the Democratic vote and denouncing his platform.

In contrast to Bryan's dramatic efforts, McKinley conducted a "front porch" campaign from his home in Canton, Ohio. Instead of having McKinley travel to see the voters, Mark Hanna brought 500,000 voters by train to McKinley's home. Once there, McKinley would greet the men from his porch. His well-organized staff prepared both the remarks of the visiting delegations and the candidate's responses, focusing the comments on the assigned topic of the day. The remarks were issued to the newsmen and telegraphed nationwide to appear in the next day's papers. Bryan, with practically no staff, gave much the same talk over and over again. McKinley labeled Bryan's proposed social and economic reforms as a serious threat to the national economy. With the depression following the Panic of 1893 coming to an end, support for McKinley's more conservative economic policies increased, while Bryan's more radical policies began to lose support among Midwestern farmers and factory workers.

To ensure victory, Hanna paid large numbers of Republican orators (including Theodore Roosevelt) to travel around the nation denouncing Bryan as a dangerous radical. There were also reports that some potentially Democratic voters were intimidated into voting for McKinley. For example, some factory owners posted signs the day before the election announcing that, if Bryan won the election, the factory would be closed and the workers would lose their jobs.

Bryan's midsummer surge in the Midwest played out as the intense Republican counter-crusade proved effective. Bryan spent most of October in the Midwest, making 160 of his final 250 speeches there. Morgan noted, "full organization, Republican party harmony, a campaign of education with the printed and spoken word would more than counteract" Bryan's speechmaking.

Several of Bryan's advisors recommended additional campaigning in the Upper South States of Kentucky, West Virginia, Maryland and Delaware. Another plan called for a coastal tour from Washington State to Southern California. Bryan however, opted to concentrate in the Mid-West and to launch a unity tour into the heavily Republican Northeast. Bryan saw no chance of winning in New England, but felt that he needed to make a truly national appeal. On election day the results from the Pacific Coast and Upper South would be the closest of the election.

== Results ==
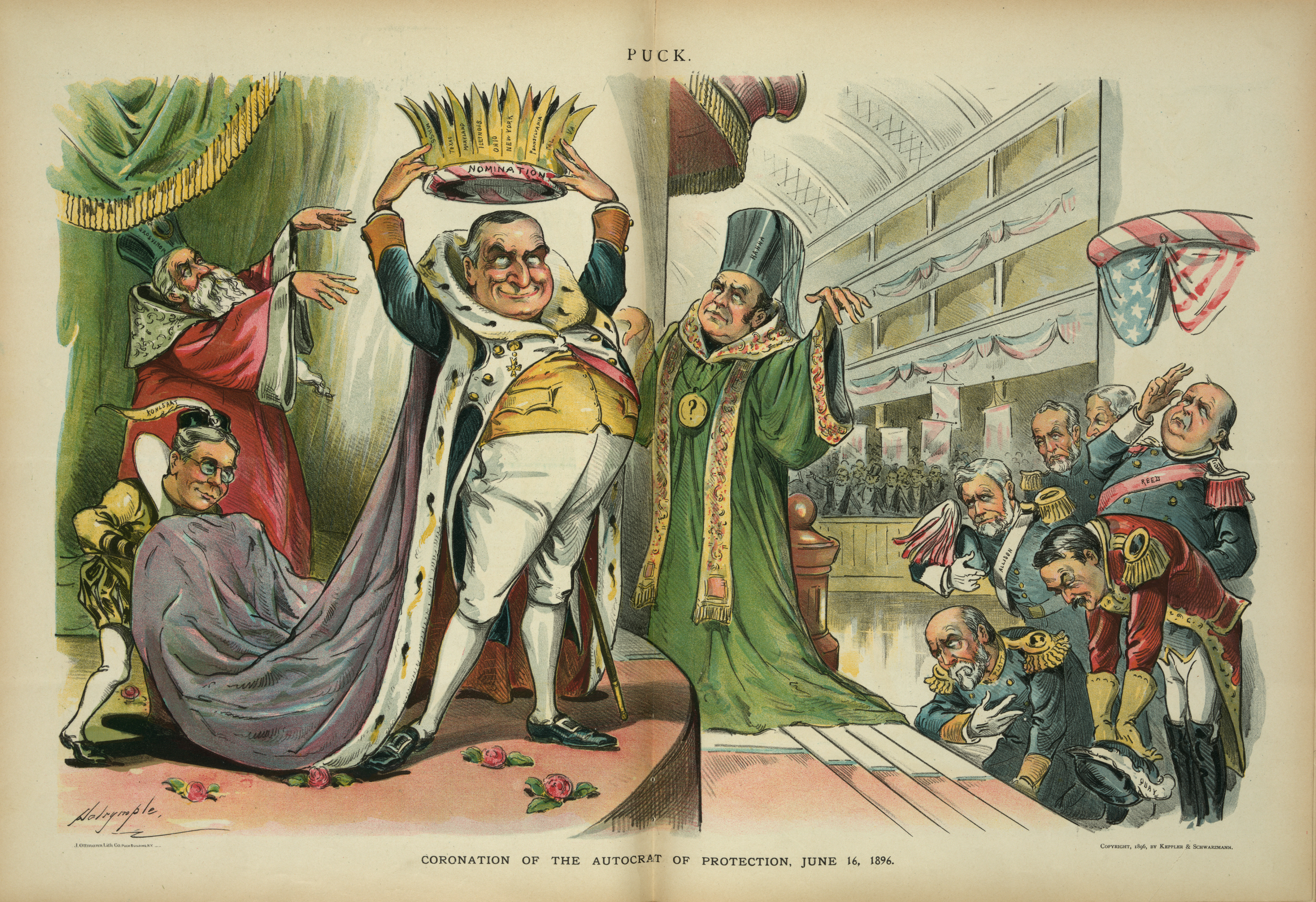
1896 campaign lithograph cartoon celebrating McKinley's victory.

Let us, as Americans, straightway devote ourselves to the upbuilding of America, to the peace, honor and glory of our common country. Party dissensions should no longer divide or rack the public mind, nor the zeal or temper of either side deter any citizen from patriotic devotion to the good of all.

— William McKinley, Telegram to RNC Chairman Mark Hanna on the results of the presidential election (November 5, 1896)

36.8% of the voting age population and 79.7% of eligible voters participated in the election. McKinley secured a solid victory in the electoral college by carrying the core of the East and Northeast, while Bryan did well among the farmers of the South, West, and rural Midwest. The large German-American voting bloc supported McKinley, who gained a large majority among the middle class, skilled factory workers, railroad workers, and large-scale farmers.

This was the first time since 1876 that a candidate won a majority of the popular vote. The national popular vote was rather close, as McKinley defeated Bryan by 602,500 votes, receiving 51% to Bryan's 46.7%: a shift of 53,000 votes in California, Kentucky, Ohio and Oregon would have won Bryan the election despite McKinley winning the majority of the popular vote, but due to the joint Democratic-Populist ticket, this also would have left Hobart and Sewell short of the 224 electoral votes required to win the vice-presidency, forcing a contingent election for vice-president in the Senate. 11.36% of McKinley's votes came from the eleven states of the former Confederacy, with him taking 35.30% of the vote in that region.

The National Democrats did not carry any states, but they did divide the Democratic vote in some states and helped the Republicans flip Kentucky cracking into the Solid South; Gold Democrats made much of the fact that Palmer's small vote in Kentucky was higher than McKinley's very narrow margin in that state. This was the first time a Republican presidential candidate had ever carried Kentucky, but they did not do so again until Calvin Coolidge in 1924. From this, they concluded that Palmer had siphoned off needed Democratic votes and hence thrown the state to McKinley. However, McKinley would have won the overall election even if he had lost Kentucky to Bryan.

The Prohibitionists dropped below a percentage point of the popular vote for the first time since their breakthrough in 1884, though the split in their vote, while sufficient to allow Palmer to finish third in the popular vote, did not prove as severe as they had initially feared. Bentley's breakaway candidacy only attracted 0.1% of the popular vote, and he only even did that well due to the New Jersey chapter of the Prohibition Party rejecting Levering and nominating Bentley as the party's candidate; the state single-handedly accounted for 40% of Bentley's overall vote. Levering largely lost votes to McKinley, as Prohibitionists who were concerned about the prospect of a Bryan presidency moved to support him; conversely, Bentley's candidacy was undermined by the emergence of Bryan, who like Bentley was a free silver supporter and was considered to be at least amenable to prohibition (though he would not publicly emerge as a supporter of it until over a decade later).

Mayor Tom L. Johnson of Cleveland, Ohio, summed up the campaign as the "first great protest of the American people against monopoly – the first great struggle of the masses in our country against the privileged classes." According to a 2017 National Bureau of Economic Research paper,

Bryan did well where mortgage interest rates were high, railroad penetration was low, and crop prices had declined by most over the previous decade. Using our estimates, we show that further declines in crop prices or increases in interest rates would have been enough to tip the Electoral College in Bryan's favor. But to change the outcome, the additional fall in crop prices would have had to be large.

A 2022 study found that campaign visits by Bryan increased his vote share by one percentage point on average. McKinley received a little more than seven million votes, Bryan a little less than six and a half million, about 800,000 in excess of the Democratic vote in 1892. It was larger than the Democratic Party was to poll in 1900, 1904, or 1912. It was somewhat less, however, than the combined vote for the Democratic and Populist nominees had been in 1892. In contrast, McKinley received nearly 2,000,000 more votes than had been cast for Benjamin Harrison, the Republican nominee, in 1892. The Republican vote was to be slightly increased during the next decade. As of 2024, this is the last occasion Northampton County North Carolina has voted for a Republican presidential candidate, which stands as the longest Democratic streak in the nation. (Note: Brooks County, Texas and Jim Hogg County, Texas, as well as Menominee County, Wisconsin and Kalawao County, Hawaii have never voted Republican but were only created in 1911, 1913, 1959, and 1905, respectively.)

The 1896 presidential election is often seen as a realigning election, in which McKinley's view of a stronger central government building American industry through protective tariffs and a dollar based on gold triumphed. The new Fourth Party System then displaced the near-deadlock in the Third Party System since the Civil War. The Republicans now usually dominated in the major states and nationwide down to the 1932 election, another realigning election with the ascent of Franklin Roosevelt and the Fifth Party System. Phillips argues that McKinley was the only Republican who could have defeated Bryan—he concludes that Eastern candidates would have done badly against the Illinois-born Bryan in the crucial Midwest. Although Bryan was popular among rural voters, "McKinley appealed to a very different industrialized, urbanized America."

=== Geography of results ===
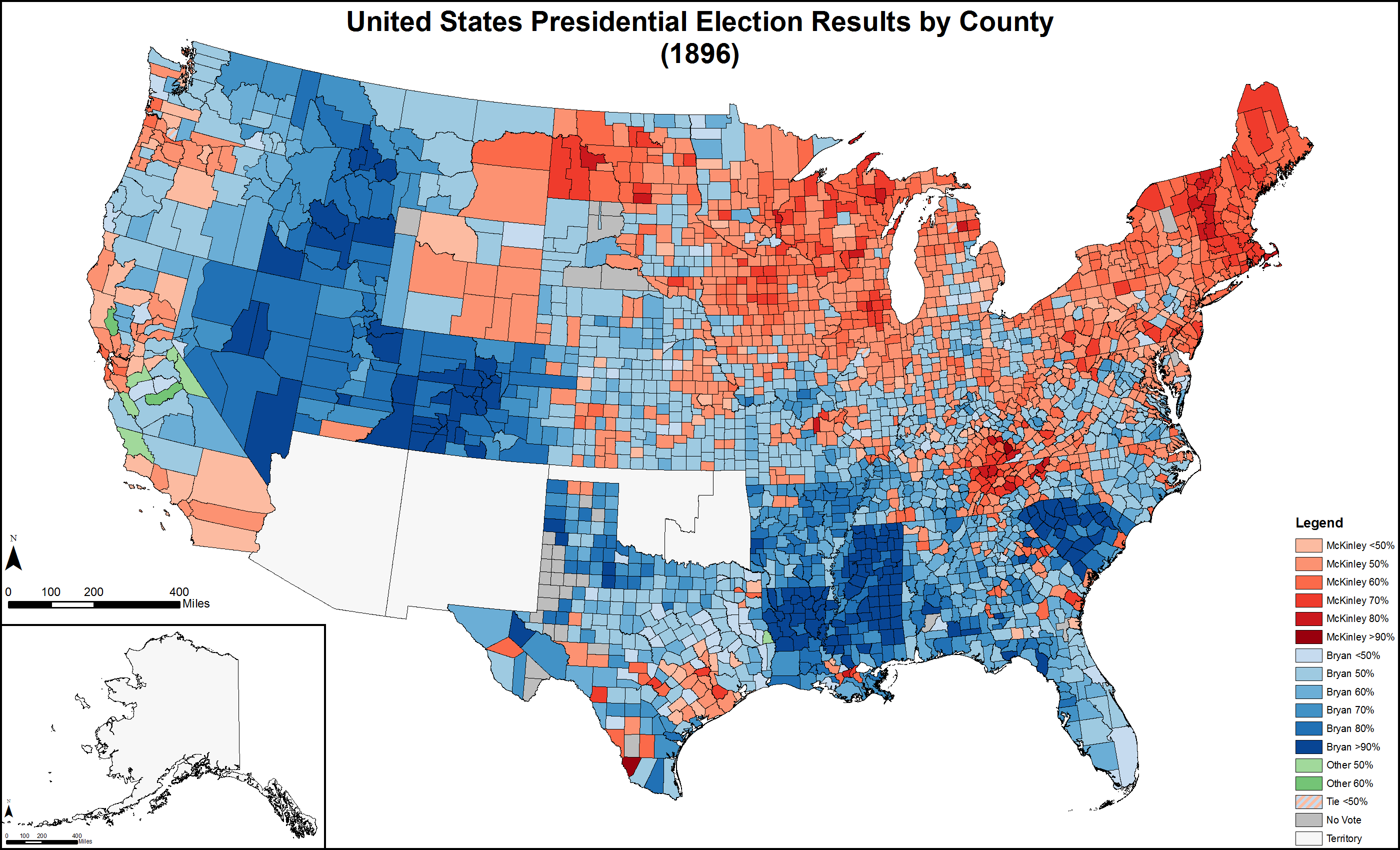
Results by county explicitly indicating the percentage for the winning candidate. Shades of red are for McKinley (Republican), shades of blue are for Bryan (Democratic), and shades of green are for "Other(s)" (Non-Democratic/Non-Republican).

One-half of the total vote of the nation was polled in eight states carried by McKinley (New York, New Jersey, Pennsylvania, Ohio, Indiana, Illinois, Michigan, and Wisconsin). In these states, Bryan not only ran far behind the Republican candidate, but also polled considerably less than half of his total vote.

Bryan only won in twelve of the eighty-two cities in the United States with populations above 45,000 with seven of those being in the Solid South. In the states that Bryan won, seven of the seventeen cities voted for McKinley while in the states that voted for McKinley only three of the sixty-five cities voted for Bryan. Bryan lost in every county in New England and only won one county in New York, with Bryan even losing in traditionally Democratic New York City, which had last failed to support a Democratic nominee in 1848.

In only one other section, in the six states of New England, was the Republican lead great; the Republican vote (614,972) was more than twice the Democratic vote (242,938), and every county was carried by the Republicans.

The West North Central section gave a slight lead to McKinley, as did the Pacific section. Nevertheless, within these sections, the states of Missouri, South Dakota, Nebraska, Kansas, and Washington were carried by Bryan.

In the South Atlantic section and in the East South Central section, the Democratic lead was pronounced, and in the West South Central section and in the Mountain section, the vote for Bryan was overwhelming. In these four sections, comprising 21 states, McKinley carried only 322 counties and four states – Delaware, Maryland, West Virginia, and Kentucky.

A striking feature of this examination of the state returns is found in the overwhelming lead for one or the other party in 22 of the 45 states. It was true of the McKinley vote in every New England state and in New York, Pennsylvania, and Illinois. It was also true of the Bryan vote in eight states of the lower South and five states of the Mountain West. Sectionalism was thus marked in this first election of the Fourth Party System. This was the last election in which the Democrats won South Dakota until 1932, the last in which the Democrats won Utah and Washington until 1916, and the last in which the Democrats won Kansas and Wyoming until 1912. It was also the last time that South Dakota and Washington voted against the Republicans until they voted for the Progressive Party in 1912. This also constitutes the only election since their statehoods when a Republican won the presidency without winning Kansas, South Dakota, Utah, or Wyoming. Today these are solidly Republican states and have not backed a Democratic nominee since Lyndon Johnson's 1964 landslide over Barry Goldwater. This is one of two occasions where Idaho and Montana backed a losing Democrat (along with 1900), and one of two occasions where Nebraska did so (along with 1908). This is the first occasion where Republicans won without Colorado.

In the South, there were numerous Republican counties, notably in Texas, Tennessee, North Carolina, Kentucky, northern Alabama and Virginia, representing a mix of white Southern Unionist counties along with majority black counties in areas where black disenfranchisement was not yet complete (such as North Carolina, where a Republican-Populist fusion ticket had captured the General Assembly in 1894). Even in Georgia, a state in the Deep South, there were counties returning Republican majorities.

Electoral results
Presidential candidate	Party	Home state	Popular vote		Electoral vote	Running mate		
Presidential candidate	Party	Home state	Count	Percentage	Electoral vote	Vice-presidential candidate	Home state	Electoral vote
William McKinley	Republican	Ohio	7,111,607	51.03%	271	Garret Hobart	New Jersey	271
William Jennings Bryan	Democratic-Populist-Silver-Silver Republican	Nebraska	6,509,052^{(a)}	46.70%	176	Arthur Sewall^{(b)}	Maine	149
William Jennings Bryan	Democratic-Populist-Silver-Silver Republican	Nebraska	6,509,052^{(a)}	46.70%	176	Thomas E. Watson^{(c)}	Georgia	27
John M. Palmer	National Democratic	Illinois	134,645	0.97%	0	Simon Bolivar Buckner	Kentucky	0
Joshua Levering	Prohibition	Maryland	131,312	0.94%	0	Hale Johnson	Illinois	0
Charles H. Matchett	Socialist Labor	New York	36,373	0.26%	0	Matthew Maguire	New Jersey	0
Charles Eugene Bentley	National Prohibition	Nebraska	13,968	0.10%	0	James H. Southgate	North Carolina	0
Other			1,570	0.01%	—	Other		—
Total			13,936,957	100%	447			447
Needed to win					224			224

^{(a)} Includes 912,241 votes as the People's nominee
^{(b)} Sewall was Bryan's Democratic running mate.
^{(c)} Watson was Bryan's People's running mate.

Source (Popular Vote):

Source (Electoral Vote): "Electoral College Box Scores 1789–1996". National Archives and Records Administration.

Popular vote
McKinley	51.02%
Bryan (D)	40.07%
Bryan (P)	6.54%
Palmer	0.96%
Levering	0.90%
Matchett	0.26%
Bryan (S)	0.15%
Others	0.01%

Electoral vote
McKinley	60.63%
Bryan (D)	31.77%
Bryan (P)	6.94%
Bryan (S)	0.67%

=== Geography of results ===
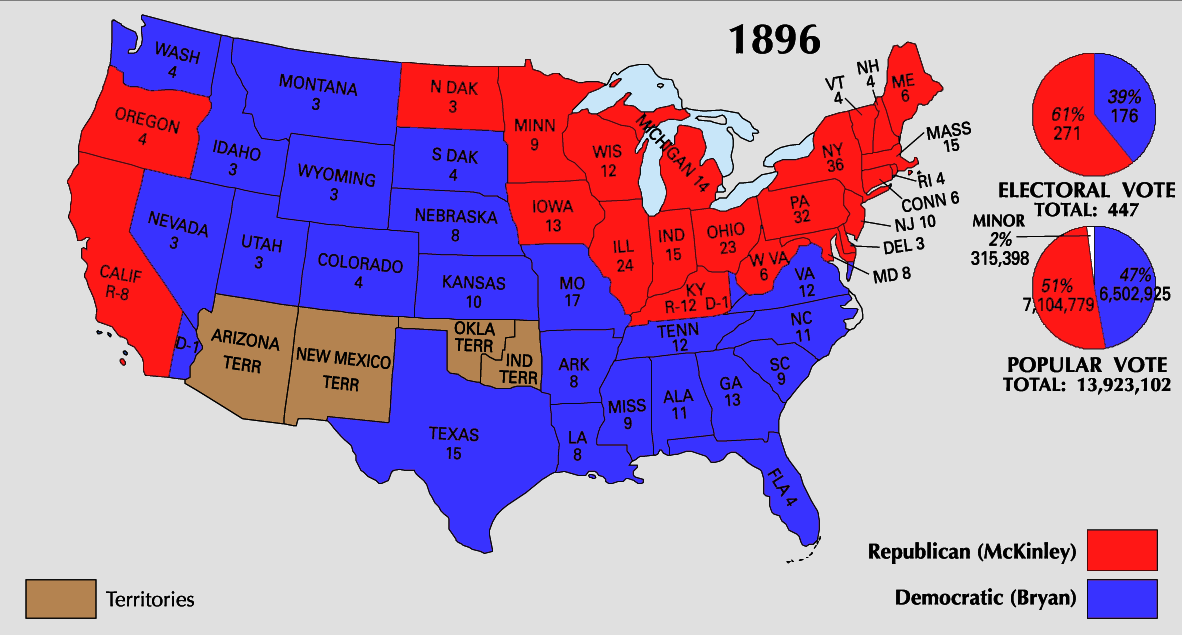

Electoral ballots for the Vice Presidency by state, red for Hobart, blue for Sewall, and green for Watson

Results by county, shaded according to winning candidate's percentage of the vote

=== Cartographic gallery ===
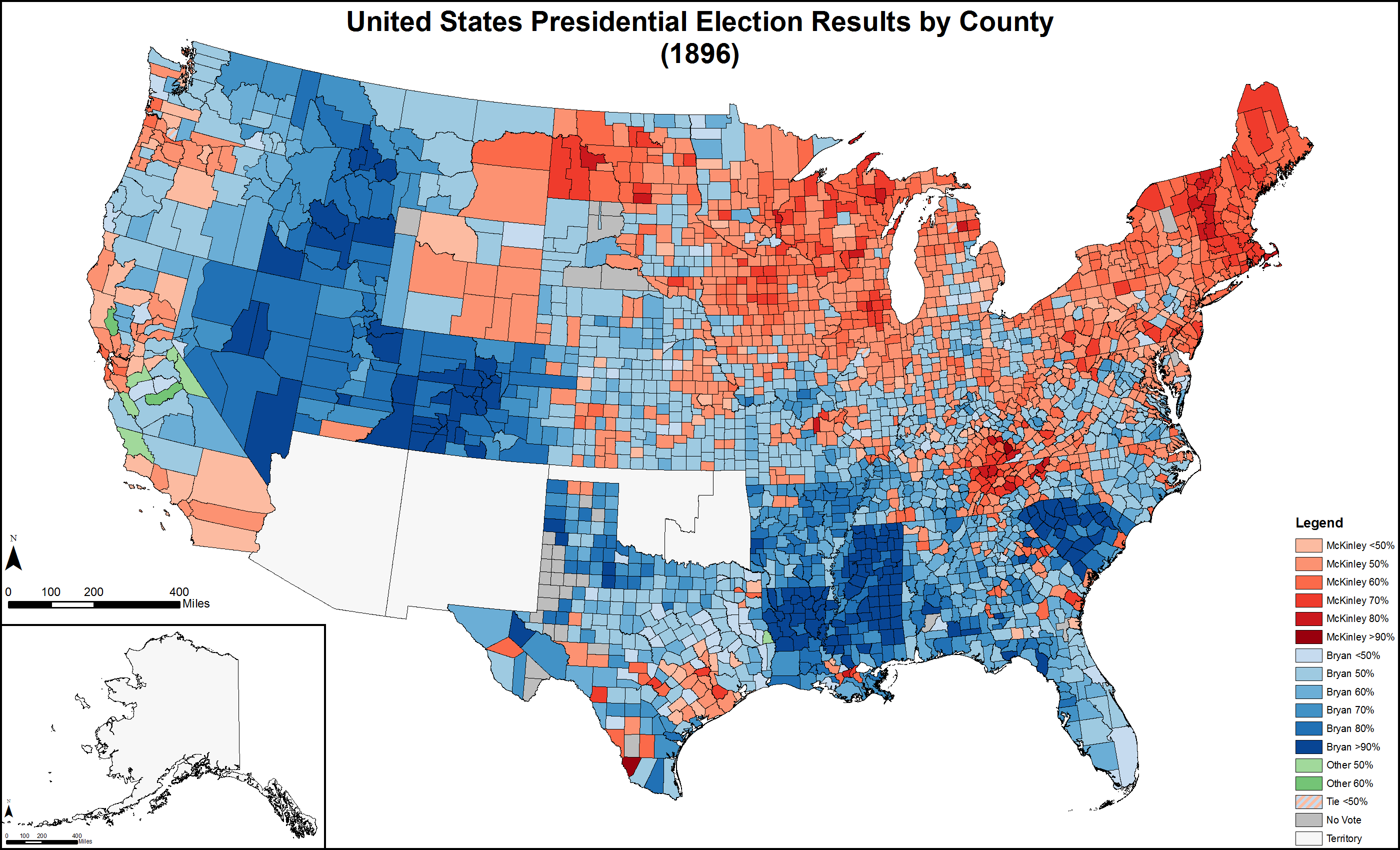
Map of presidential election results by county

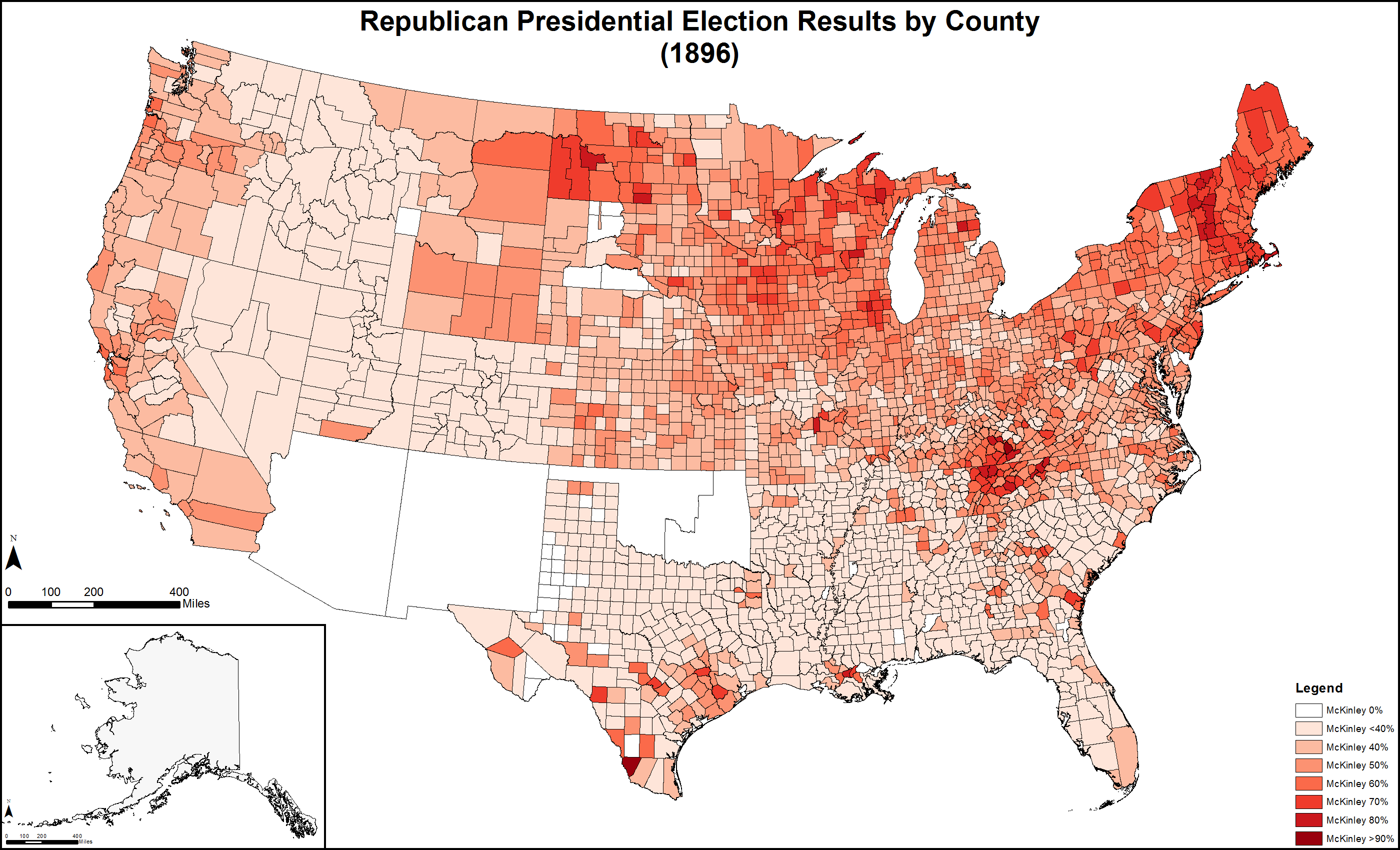
Map of Republican presidential election results by county

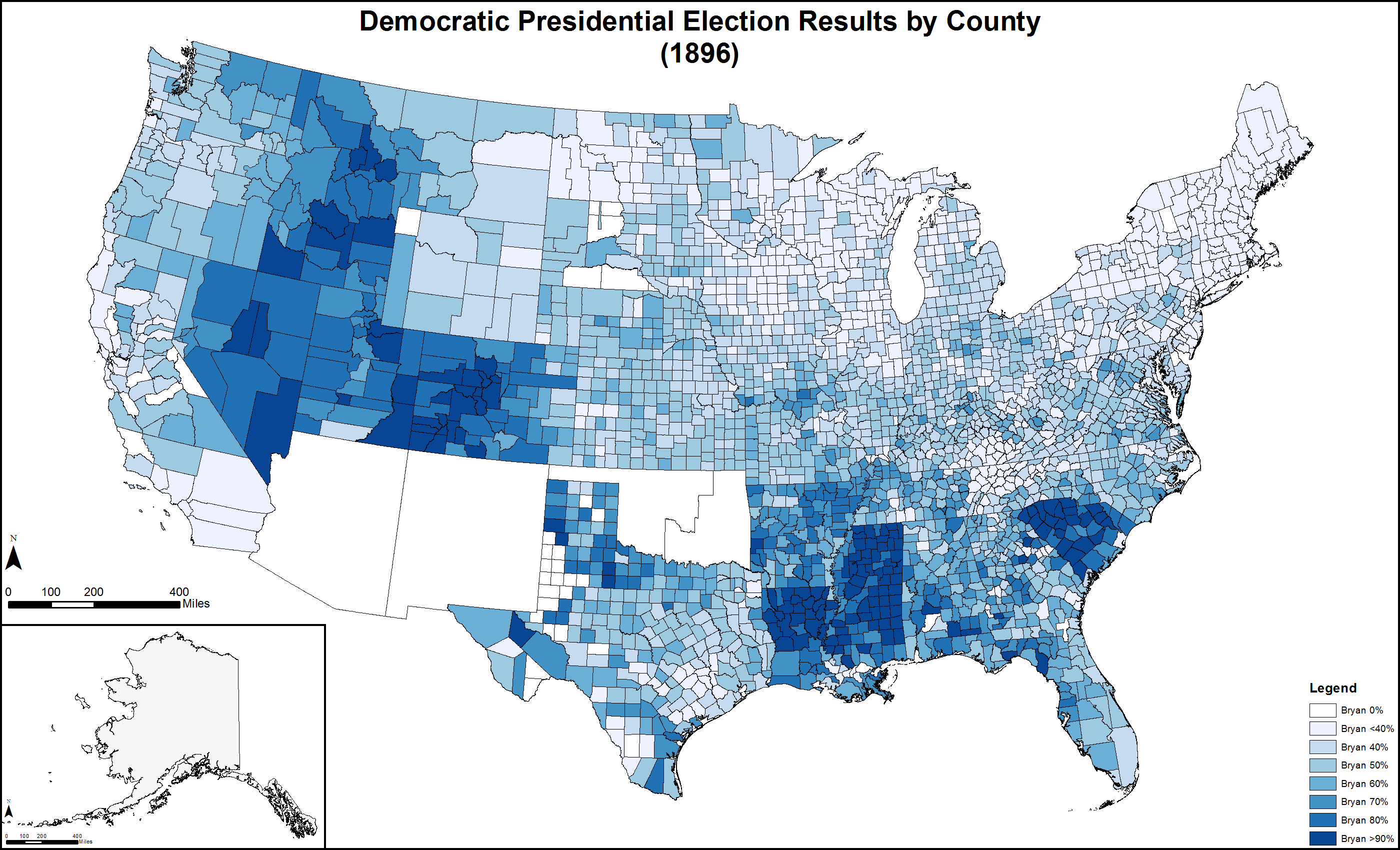
Map of Democratic presidential election results by county

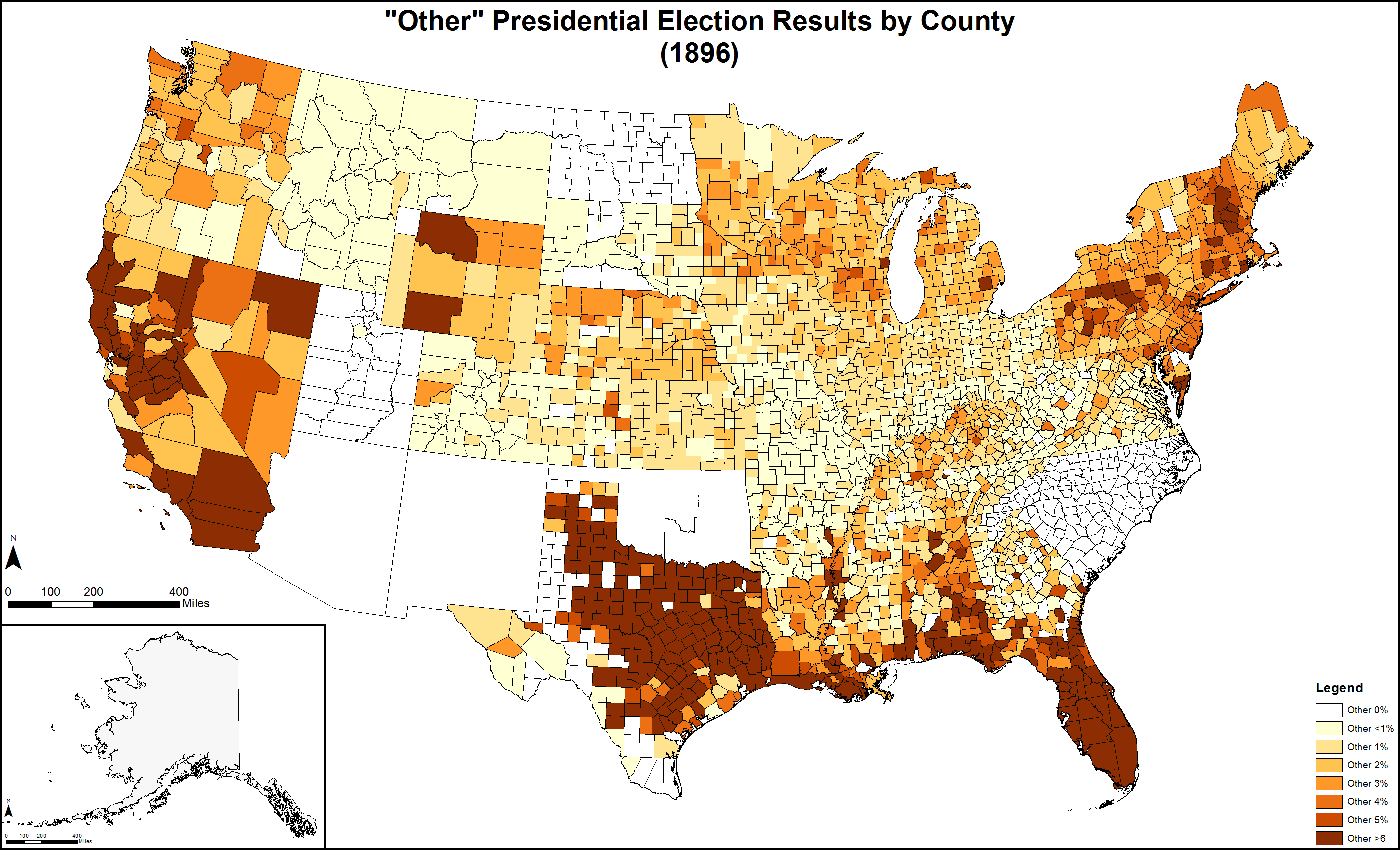
Map of "other" presidential election results by county

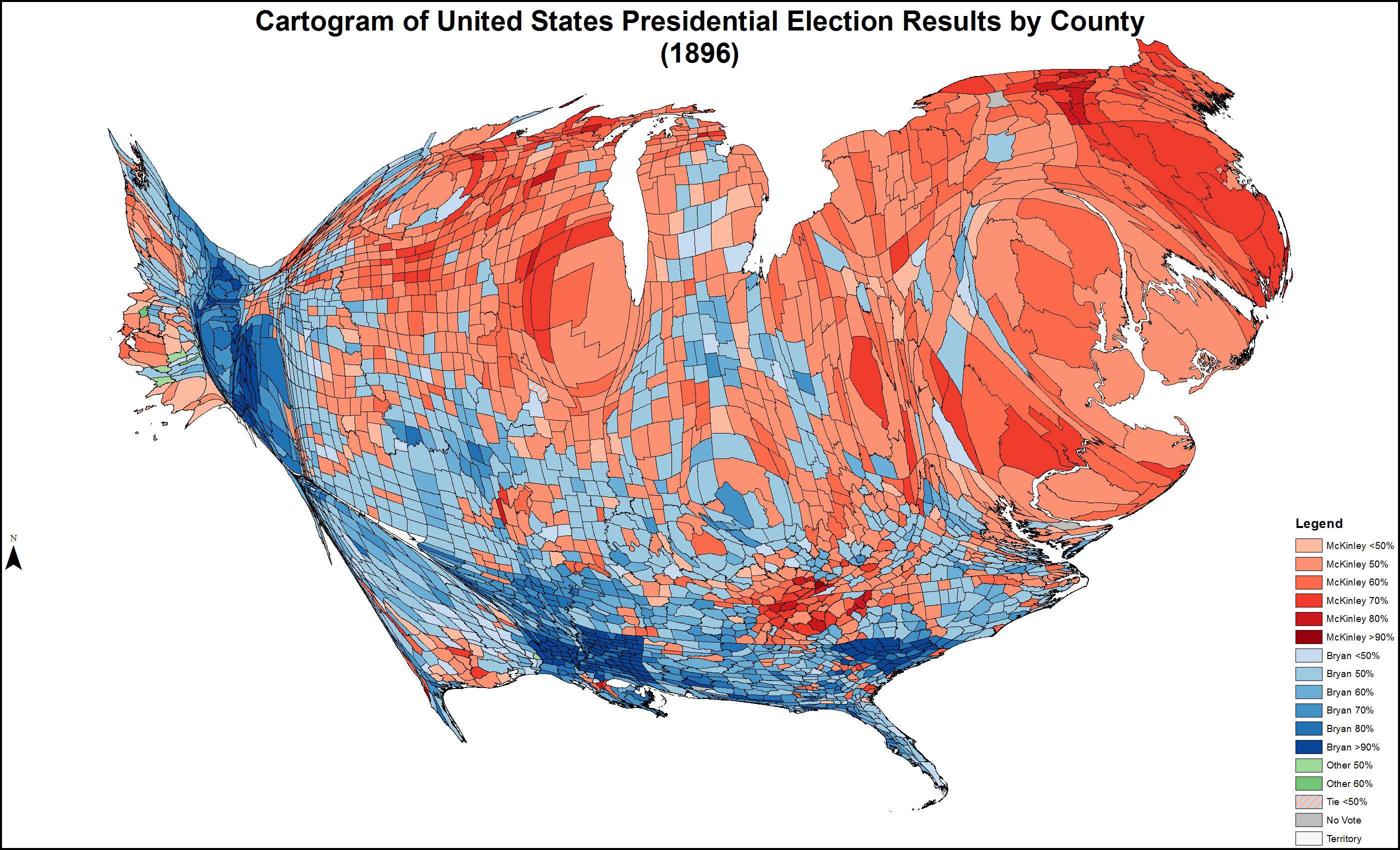
Cartogram of presidential election results by county

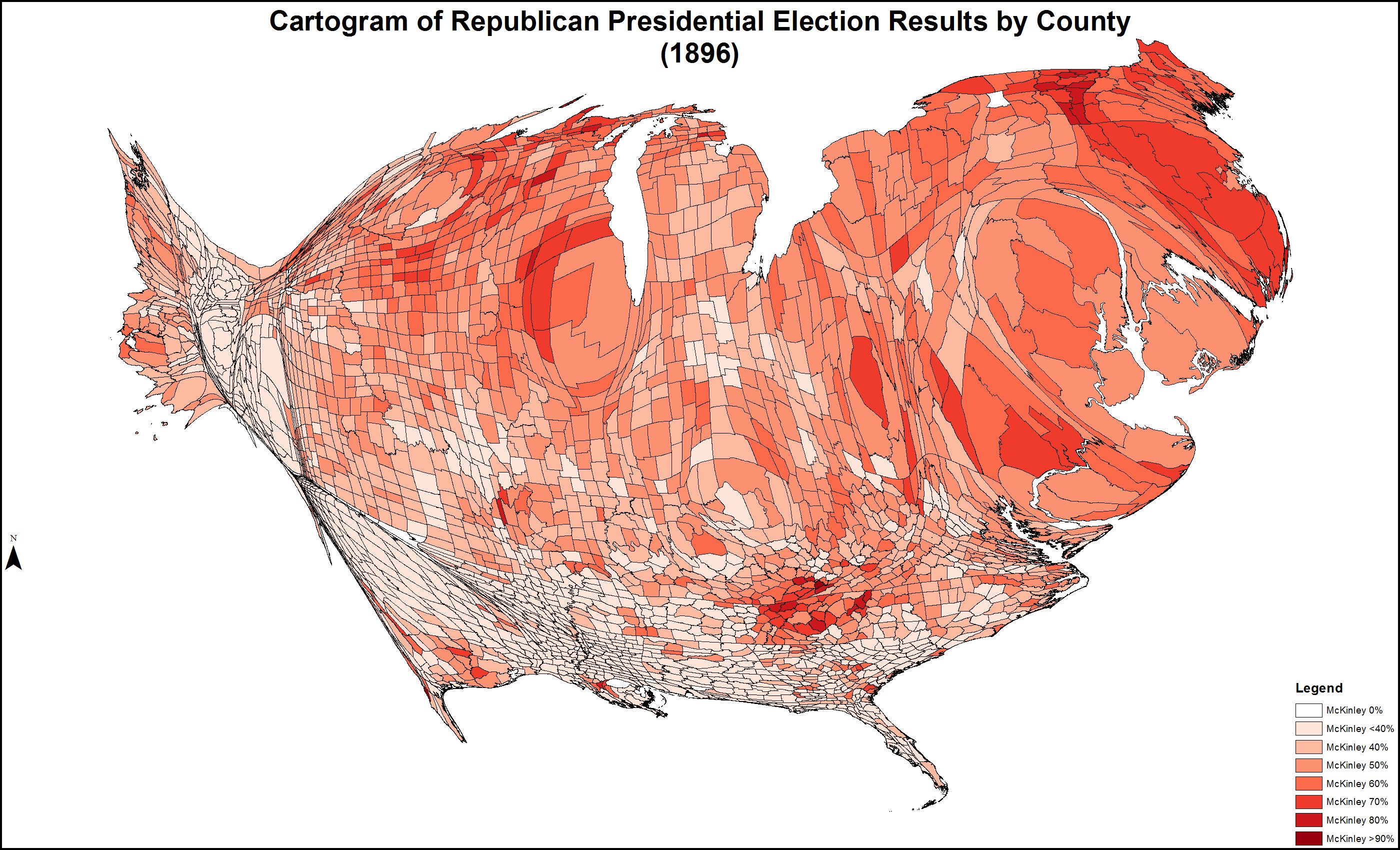
Cartogram of Republican presidential election results by county

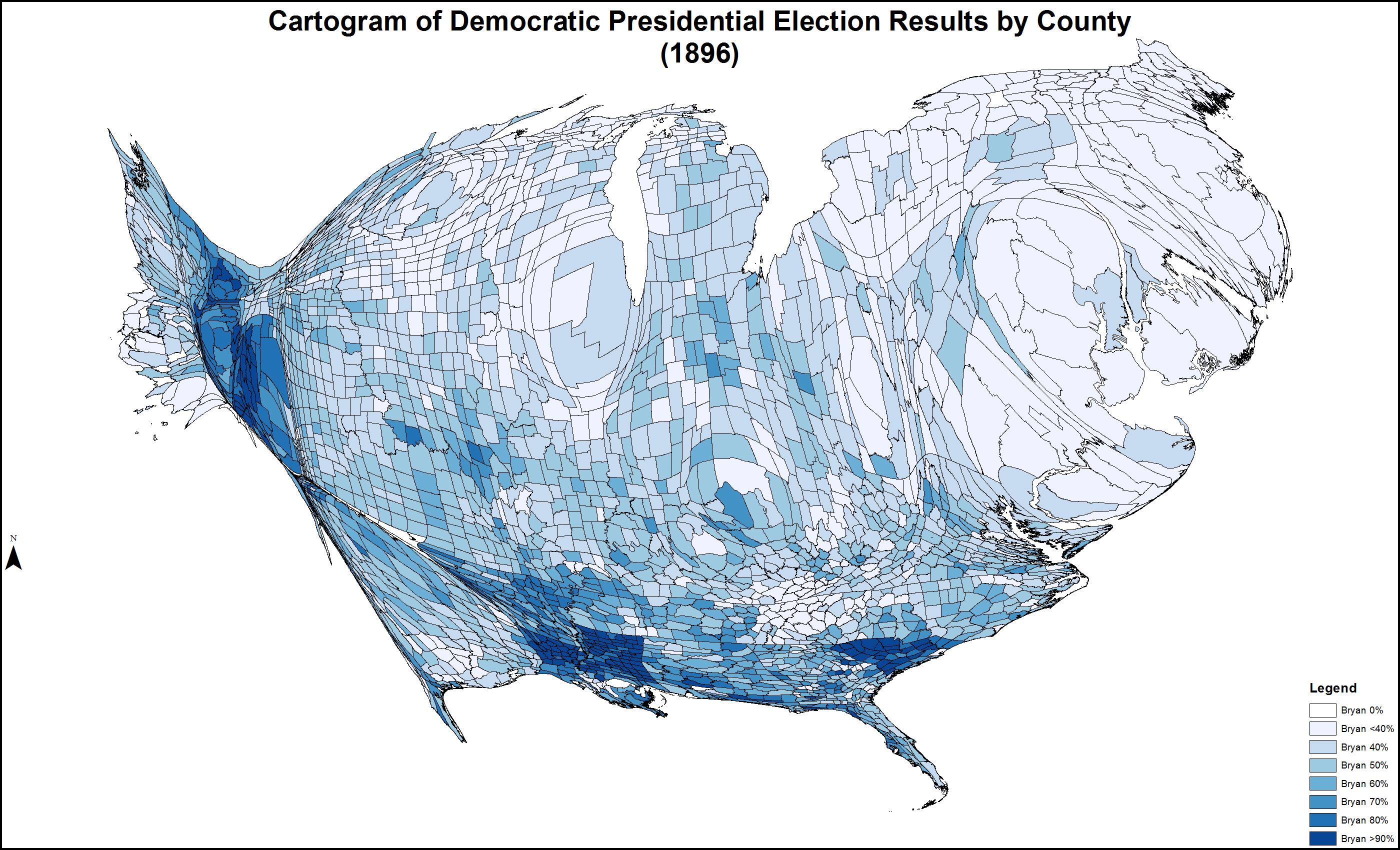
Cartogram of Democratic presidential election results by county

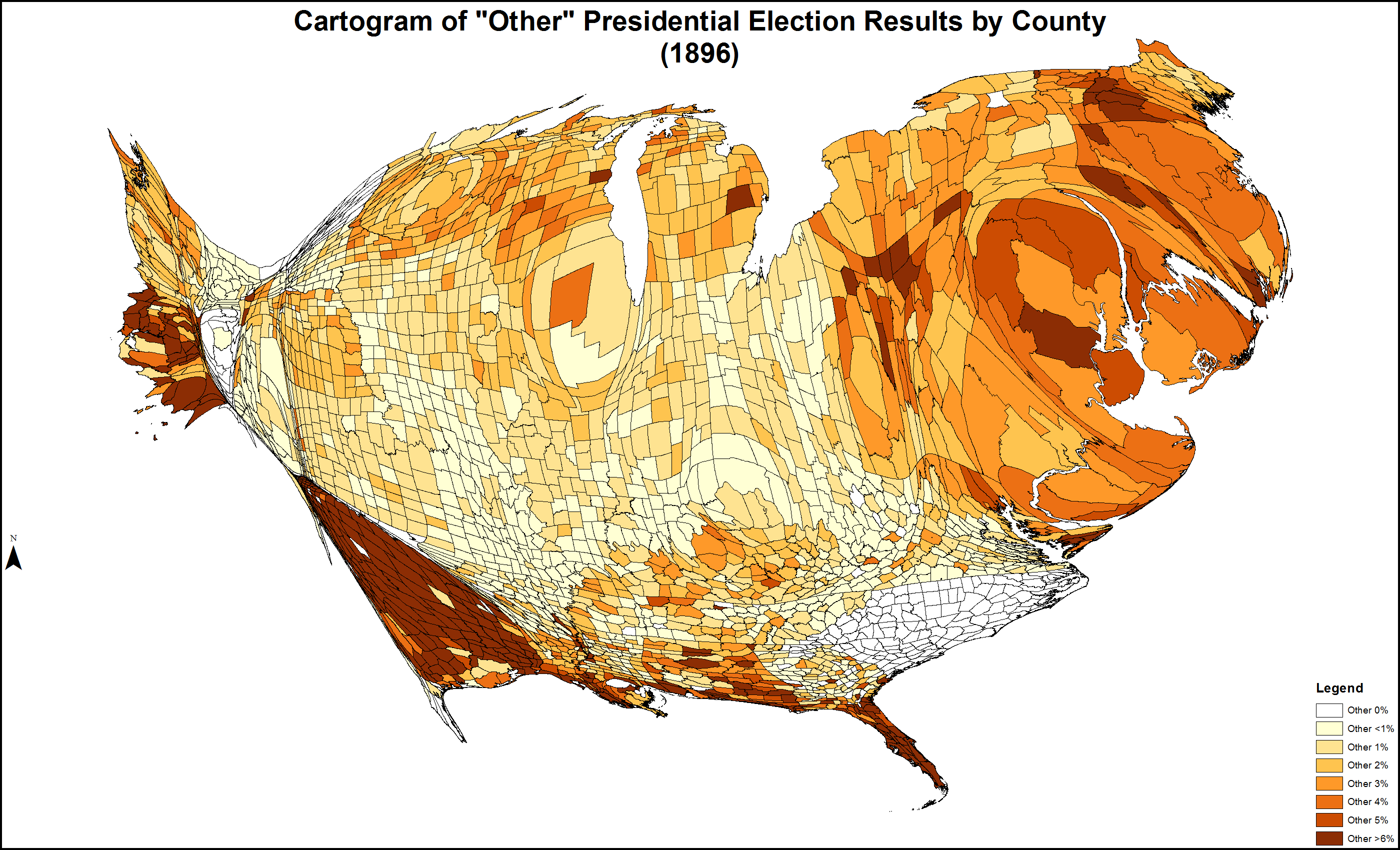
Cartogram of "other" presidential election results by county

=== Results by state ===
States/districts won by Bryan/Sewall or Bryan/Watson
States/districts won by McKinley/Hobart

		William McKinley Republican			William Jennings Bryan Democratic/Populist			John Palmer National Democrat			Joshua Levering Prohibition			Charles Matchett Socialist Labor			Charles Bentley National Prohibition			Margin		State Total	
State	electoral votes	#	%	electoral votes	#	%	electoral votes	#	%	electoral votes	#	%	electoral votes	#	%	electoral votes	#	%	electoral votes	#	%	#	
Alabama	11	55,673	28.61	-	130,298	66.96	11	6,375	3.28	-	2,234	1.15	-	-	-	-	-	-	-	-74,625	-38.35	194,580	AL
Arkansas	8	37,512	25.12	-	110,103	73.72	8	-	-	-	839	0.56	-	-	-	-	893	0.60	-	-72,591	-48.61	149,347	AR
California	9	146,688	49.16	8	144,766	48.51	1	1,730	0.58	-	2,573	0.86	-	1,611	0.54	-	1,047	0.35	-	1,922	0.64	298,419	CA
Colorado	4	26,271	13.86	-	161,005	84.95	4	1	0.00	-	1,717	0.91	-	159	0.08	-	386	0.20	-	-134,734	-71.09	189,539	CO
Connecticut	6	110,285	63.24	6	56,740	32.54	-	4,336	2.49	-	1,806	1.04	-	1,223	0.70	-	-	-	-	53,545	30.70	174,390	CT
Delaware	3	20,450	53.18	3	16,574	43.10	-	966	2.51	-	466	1.21	-	-	-	-	-	-	-	3,876	10.08	38,456	DE
Florida	4	11,298	24.30	-	32,756	70.46	4	1,778	3.82	-	656	1.41	-	-	-	-	-	-	-	-21,458	-46.16	46,488	FL
Georgia	13	59,395	36.56	-	93,885	57.78	13	3,670	2.26	-	5,483	3.37	-	-	-	-	-	-	-	-34,490	-21.23	162,480	GA
Idaho	3	6,314	21.32	-	23,135	78.10	3	-	-	-	172	0.58	-	-	-	-	-	-	-	-16,821	-56.79	29,621	ID
Illinois	24	607,130	55.66	24	465,613	42.68	-	6,390	0.59	-	9,796	0.90	-	1,147	0.11	-	793	0.07	-	141,517	12.97	1,090,869	IL
Indiana	15	323,754	50.82	15	305,573	47.96	-	2,145	0.34	-	3,056	0.48	-	324	0.05	-	2,267	0.36	-	18,181	2.85	637,119	IN
Iowa	13	289,293	55.47	13	223,741	42.90	-	4,516	0.87	-	3,192	0.61	-	453	0.09	-	352	0.07	-	65,552	12.57	521,547	IA
Kansas	10	159,345	47.63	-	171,675	51.32	10	1,209	0.36	-	1,698	0.51	-	-	-	-	620	0.19	-	-12,330	-3.69	334,547	KS
Kentucky	13	218,171	48.93	12	217,894	48.86	1	5,084	1.14	-	4,779	1.07	-	-	-	-	-	-	-	277	0.06	445,928	KY
Louisiana	8	22,037	21.81	-	77,175	76.38	8	1,834	1.82	-	-	-	-	-	-	-	-	-	-	-55,138	-54.57	101,046	LA
Maine	6	80,403	67.90	6	34,587	29.21	-	1,867	1.58	-	1,562	1.32	-	-	-	-	-	-	-	45,816	38.69	118,419	ME
Maryland	8	136,959	54.73	8	104,150	41.62	-	2,499	1.00	-	5,918	2.36	-	587	0.23	-	136	0.05	-	32,809	13.11	250,249	MD
Massachusetts	15	278,976	69.47	15	105,711	26.32	-	11,749	2.93	-	2,998	0.75	-	2,114	0.53	-	-	-	-	173,265	43.15	401,568	MA
Michigan	14	293,336	53.77	14	237,166	43.47	-	6,923	1.27	-	4,978	0.91	-	293	0.05	-	1,816	0.33	-	56,170	10.30	545,585	MI
Minnesota	9	193,503	56.62	9	139,735	40.89	-	3,222	0.94	-	4,348	1.27	-	954	0.28	-	-	-	-	53,768	15.73	341,762	MN
Mississippi	9	4,819	6.92	-	63,355	91.04	9	1,021	1.47	-	396	0.57	-	-	-	-	-	-	-	-58,536	-84.11	69,591	MS
Missouri	17	304,940	45.25	-	363,667	53.96	17	2,365	0.35	-	2,043	0.30	-	599	0.09	-	292	0.04	-	-58,727	-8.71	673,906	MO
Montana	3	10,509	19.71	-	42,628	79.93	3	-	-	-	193	0.36	-	-	-	-	-	-	-	-32,119	-60.23	53,330	MT
Nebraska	8	103,064	46.18	-	115,007	51.53	8	2,885	1.29	-	1,243	0.56	-	186	0.08	-	797	0.36	-	-11,943	-5.35	223,182	NE
Nevada	3	1,938	18.79	-	8,376	81.21	3	-	-	-	-	-	-	-	-	-	-	-	-	-6,438	-62.42	10,314	NV
New Hampshire	4	57,444	68.66	4	21,650	25.88	-	3,520	4.21	-	779	0.93	-	228	0.27	-	49	0.06	-	35,794	42.78	83,670	NH
New Jersey	10	221,535	59.68	10	133,695	36.02	-	6,378	1.72	-	-	-	-	3,986	1.07	-	5,617	1.51	-	87,840	23.66	371,211	NJ
New York	36	819,838	57.58	36	551,369	38.72	-	18,950	1.33	-	16,052	1.13	-	17,667	1.24	-	-	-	-	268,469	18.85	1,423,876	NY
North Carolina	11	155,122	46.82	-	174,408	52.64	11	578	0.17	-	635	0.19	-	-	-	-	222	0.07	-	-19,286	-5.82	331,337	NC
North Dakota	3	26,335	55.57	3	20,686	43.65	-	-	-	-	358	0.76	-	-	-	-	-	-	-	5,649	11.92	47,391	ND
Ohio	23	525,991	51.86	23	477,497	47.08	-	1,858	0.18	-	5,068	0.50	-	1,165	0.11	-	2,716	0.27	-	48,494	4.78	1,014,295	OH
Oregon	4	48,779	50.07	4	46,739	47.98	-	977	1.00	-	919	0.94	-	-	-	-	-	-	-	2,040	2.09	97,414	OR
Pennsylvania	32	728,300	60.98	32	433,228	36.27	-	11,000	0.92	-	19,274	1.61	-	1,683	0.14	-	870	0.07	-	295,072	24.71	1,194,355	PA
Rhode Island	4	37,437	68.33	4	14,459	26.39	-	1,166	2.13	-	1,160	2.12	-	558	1.02	-	-	-	-	22,978	41.94	54,785	RI
South Carolina	9	9,313	13.51	-	58,801	85.30	9	824	1.20	-	-	-	-	-	-	-	-	-	-	-49,488	-71.79	68,938	SC
South Dakota	4	41,042	49.48	-	41,225	49.70	4	-	-	-	683	0.82	-	-	-	-	-	-	-	-183	-0.22	82,950	SD
Tennessee	12	148,683	46.33	-	167,168	52.09	12	1,953	0.61	-	3,099	0.97	-	-	-	-	-	-	-	-18,485	-5.76	320,903	TN
Texas	15	167,520	30.75	-	370,434	68.00	15	5,046	0.93	-	1,786	0.33	-	-	-	-	-	-	-	-202,914	-37.25	544,786	TX
Utah	3	13,491	17.27	-	64,607	82.70	3	-	-	-	-	-	-	-	-	-	-	-	-	-51,116	-65.43	78,119	UT
Vermont	4	51,127	80.08	4	10,640	16.66	-	1,331	2.08	-	733	1.15	-	-	-	-	-	-	-	40,487	63.41	63,847	VT
Virginia	12	135,379	45.94	-	154,708	52.50	12	2,129	0.72	-	2,350	0.80	-	108	0.04	-	-	-	-	-19,329	-6.56	294,674	VA
Washington	4	39,153	41.84	-	53,314	56.97	4	-	-	-	968	1.03	-	-	-	-	148	0.16	-	-14,161	-15.13	93,583	WA
West Virginia	6	105,379	52.23	6	94,480	46.83	-	678	0.34	-	1,220	0.60	-	-	-	-	-	-	-	10,899	5.40	201,757	WV
Wisconsin	12	268,135	59.93	12	165,523	37.00	-	4,584	1.02	-	7,507	1.68	-	1,314	0.29	-	346	0.08	-	102,612	22.93	447,409	WI
Wyoming	3	10,072	47.75	-	10,861	51.49	3	-	-	-	159	0.75	-	-	-	-	-	-	-	-789	-3.74	21,092	WY
TOTALS:	447	7,112,138	51.02	271	6,510,807	46.71	176	133,537	0.96	-	124,896	0.90	-	36,359	0.26	-	19,367	0.14	-	601,331	4.31	13,938,674	US

=== States that flipped from Democratic to Republican ===
- California
- Connecticut
- Delaware
- Illinois
- Indiana
- Kentucky
- Maryland
- New Jersey
- New York
- West Virginia
- Wisconsin

=== States that flipped from Republican to Democratic ===
- Montana
- Nebraska
- South Dakota
- Washington
- Wyoming

=== States that flipped from Populist to Democratic ===
- Colorado
- Idaho
- Kansas
- Nevada

=== States that flipped from Populist to Republican ===
- North Dakota

=== Close states ===
Margin of victory less than 1% (26 electoral votes; 20 won by Republicans; 6 by Democrats):

1. Kentucky, 0.06% (277 votes)
2. South Dakota, 0.22% (183 votes)
3. California, 0.64% (1,922 votes)

Margin of victory less than 5% (55 electoral votes; 42 won by Republicans; 13 by Democrats):

1. Oregon, 2.09% (2,040 votes)
2. Indiana, 2.85% (18,181 votes)
3. Kansas, 3.69% (12,330 votes)
4. Wyoming, 3.74% (789 votes)
5. Ohio, 4.78% (48,494 votes) (tipping point state)

Margin of victory between 5% and 10% (66 electoral votes; 6 won by Republicans; 60 by Democrats):

1. Nebraska, 5.35% (11,943 votes)
2. West Virginia, 5.40% (10,899 votes)
3. Tennessee, 5.76% (18,485 votes)
4. North Carolina, 5.82% (19,286 votes)
5. Virginia, 6.56% (19,329 votes)
6. Missouri, 8.71% (58,727 votes)

==== Statistics ====
Counties with Highest Percent of Vote (Republican)

1. Zapata County, Texas 94.34%
2. Leslie County, Kentucky 91.39%
3. Addison County, Vermont 89.17%
4. Unicoi County, Tennessee 89.04%
5. Keweenaw County, Michigan 88.96%

Counties with Highest Percent of Vote (Democratic)

1. West Carroll Parish, Louisiana 99.84%
2. Leflore County, Mississippi 99.68%
3. Smith County, Mississippi 99.26%
4. Pitkin County, Colorado 99.21%
5. Neshoba County, Mississippi 99.15%

Counties with Highest Percent of Vote (Populist)

1. Madera County, California 62.80%
2. Lake County, California 61.95%
3. Stanislaus County, California 59.00%
4. San Benito County, California 57.59%
5. San Luis Obispo County, California 56.37%

== In popular culture ==
The election parade for William McKinley is seen in the 1952 film adaptation of The Little House.

== See also ==
- American election campaigns in the 19th century
- History of the United States (1865–1918)
- First inauguration of William McKinley
- Political interpretations of The Wonderful Wizard of Oz
- Third Party System
- 1896 United States House of Representatives elections
- 1896–1897 United States Senate elections

== Works cited ==
- Abramson, Paul; Aldrich, John; Rohde, David (1995). Change and Continuity in the 1992 Elections. CQ Press. ISBN 0871878399.
- Sherman, Richard (1973). The Republican Party and Black America From McKinley to Hoover 1896-1933. University of Virginia Press. ISBN 0813904676.
