= Matthew Maguire (labor activist) =

Proposer of the Labor Day holiday (1842–1915)

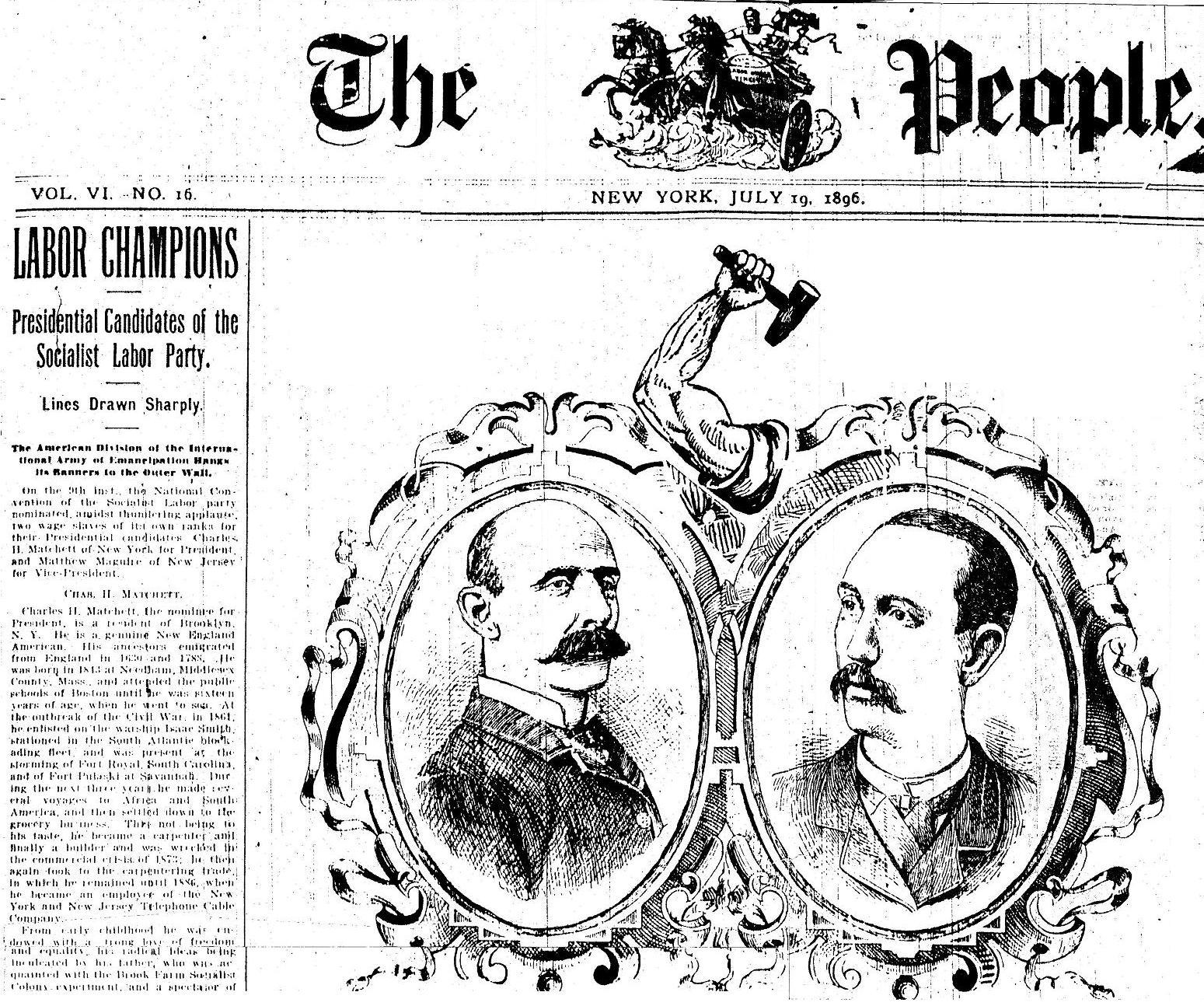
Charles H. Matchett and Matthew Maguire, The People, July 19, 1896

Matthew Maguire (April 5, 1842 – January 9, 1915) was a New Jersey machinist. In 1896, Maguire was the vice-presidential nominee of the Socialist Labor Party of America. Running on the ticket alongside Charles H. Matchett, the pair were on 20 state ballots and received 36,367 votes. The campaign received more votes than any other SLP ticket until 1944.
