= 1896 Democratic National Convention =

U.S. political event held in Chicago, Illinois

- 1896 presidential election
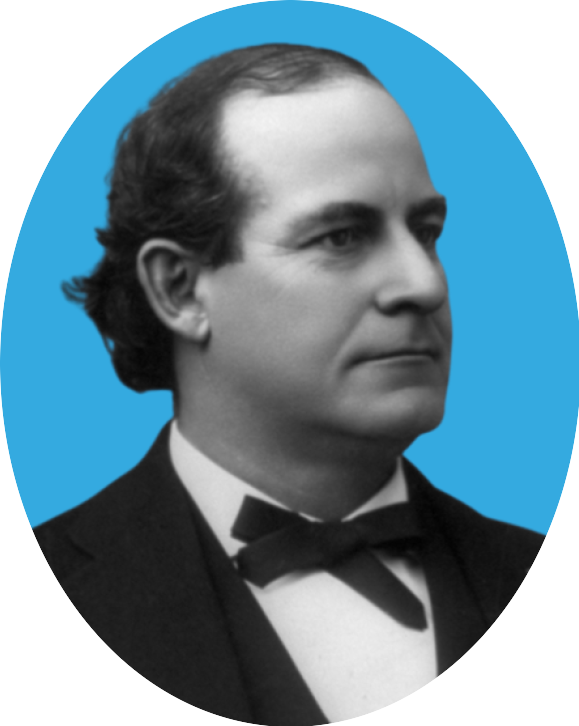
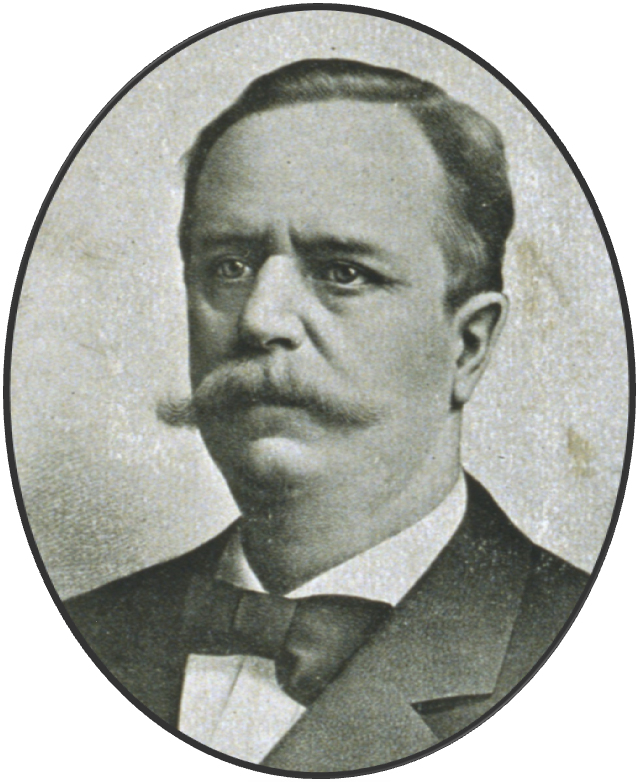
- Nominees; Bryan and Sewall

Convention
- Date(s): July 7–11, 1896
- City: Chicago, Illinois
- Venue: Chicago Coliseum

Candidates
- Presidential nominee: William J. Bryan of Nebraska
- Vice-presidential nominee: Arthur Sewall of Maine

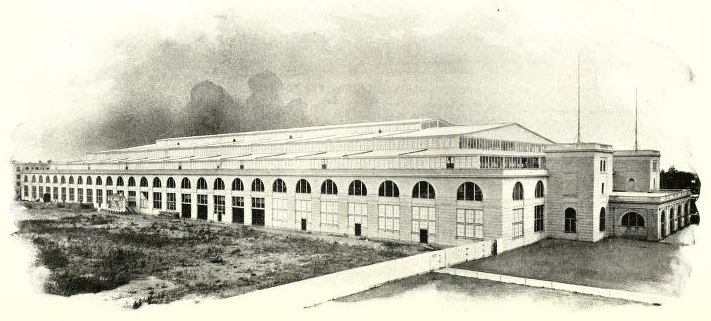
The convention was held at the Chicago Coliseum

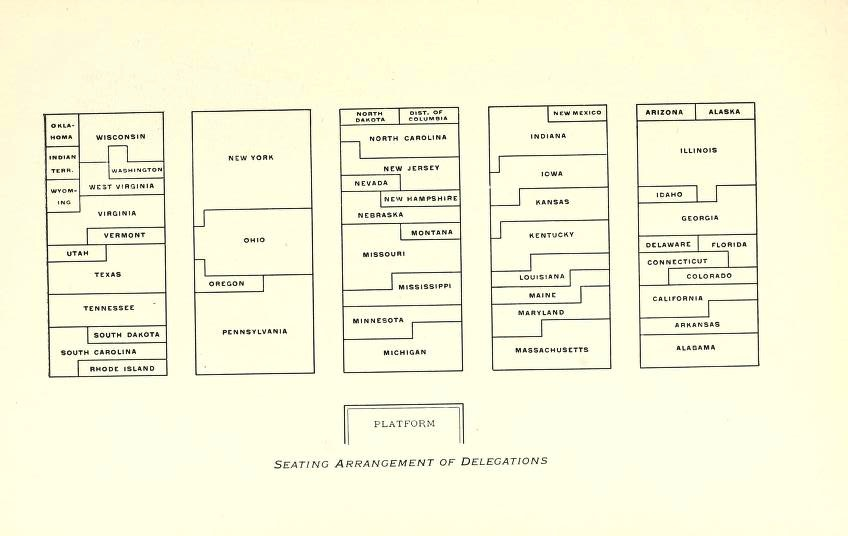
Seating arrangement for delegates at the convention

Inside the convention hall
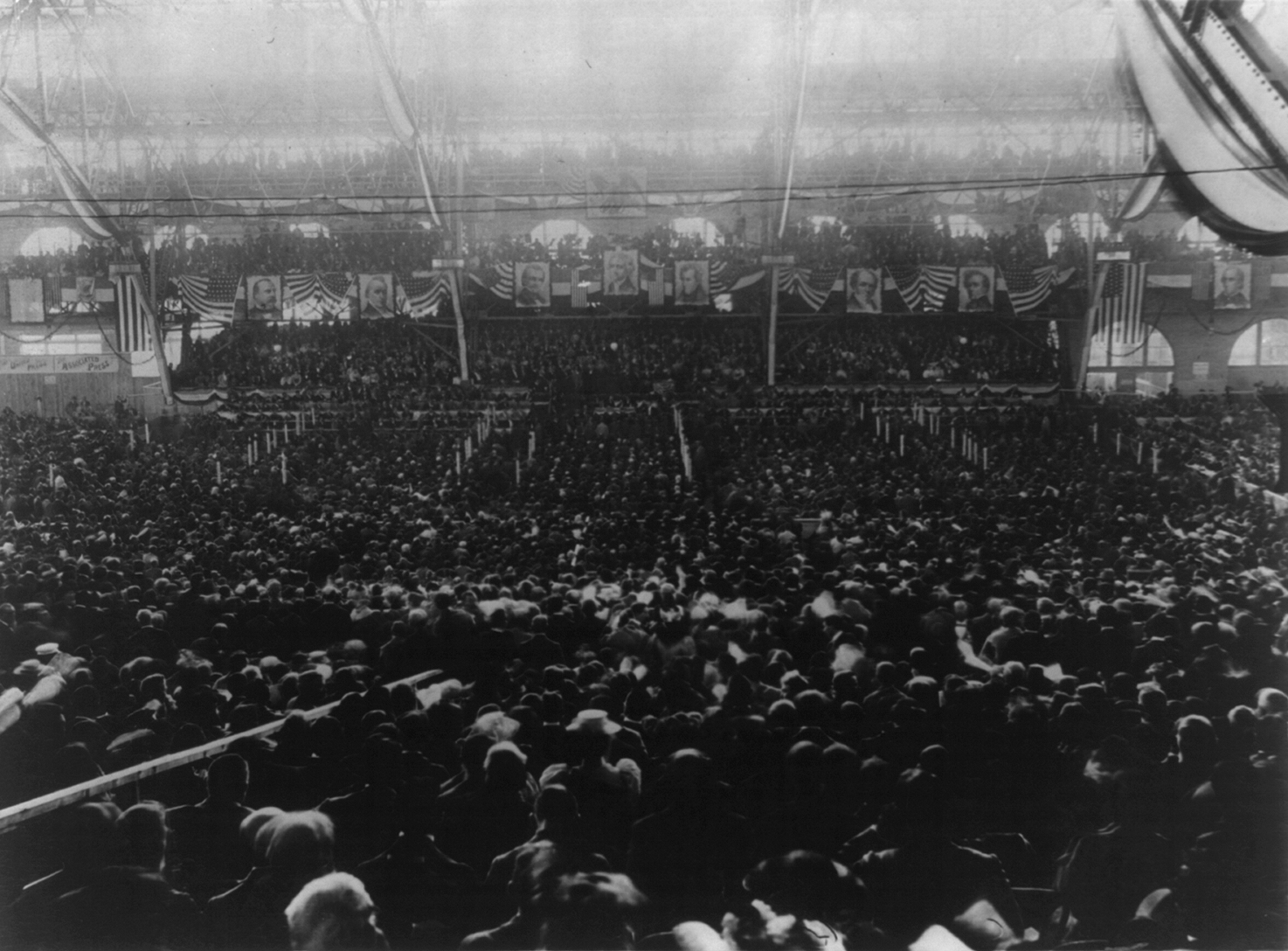
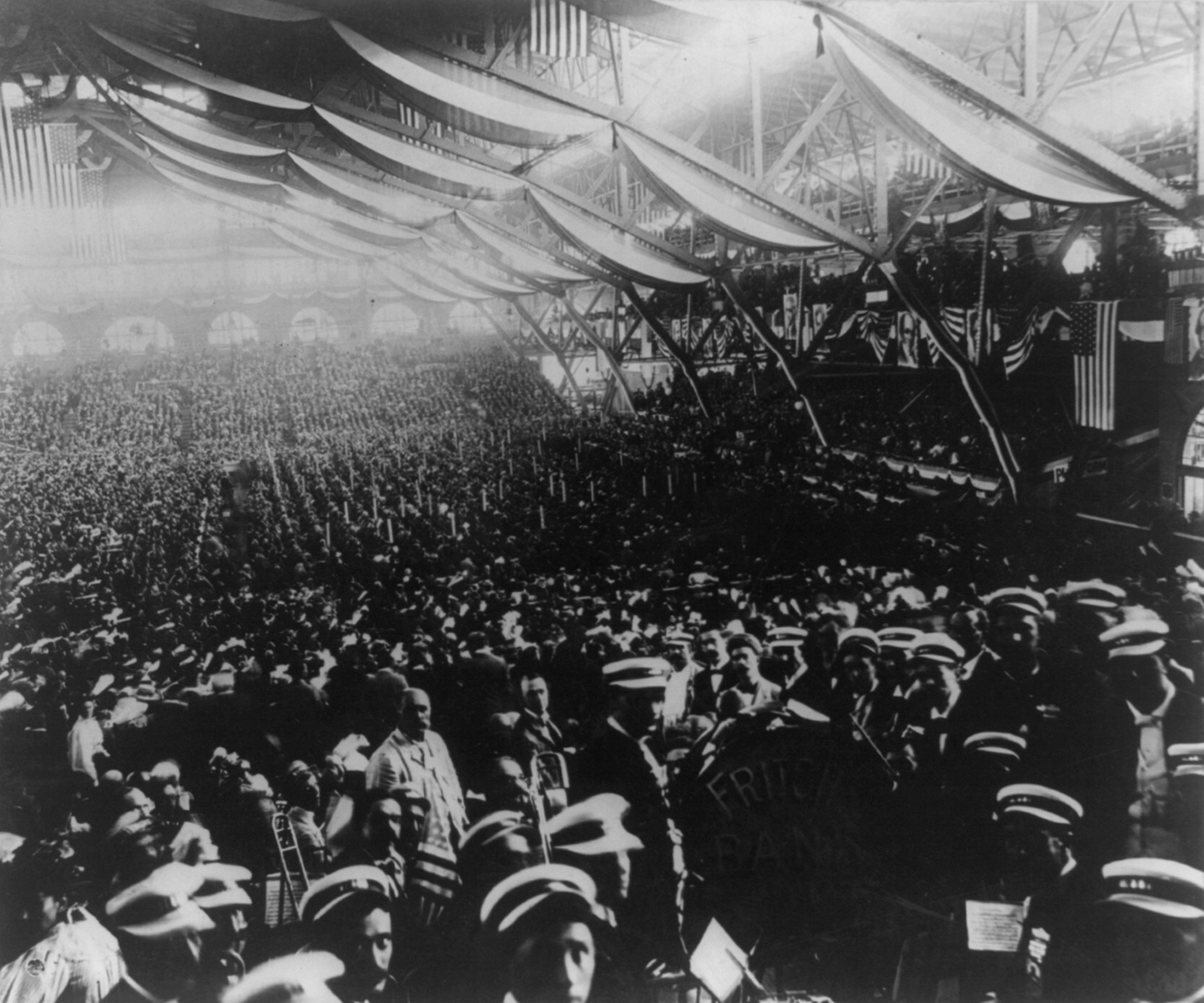

The 1896 Democratic National Convention, held at the Chicago Coliseum from July 7 to July 11, was the scene of William Jennings Bryan's nomination as the Democratic presidential candidate for the 1896 U.S. presidential election.

At age 36, Bryan was the youngest presidential nominee in American history, only one year older than the constitutional minimum. Bryan's keynote "Cross of Gold" address, delivered prior to his nomination, lambasted Eastern monied classes for supporting the gold standard at the expense of the average worker. This was a repudiation of Cleveland administration's policy, but proved popular with the delegates to the convention.

Bryan secured the nomination on the fifth ballot over Richard P. Bland. Bryan declined to choose a Democratic vice presidential nominee, leaving the choice to his fellow delegates. Arthur Sewall of Maine was nominated on the fifth ballot. Bryan and Sewall ultimately lost to the Republican candidates, William McKinley and Garret Hobart.

== Silver in control ==
For three years the nation had been mired in a deep economic depression, marked by low prices, low profits, high unemployment, and violent strikes. Economic issues, especially silver or gold for the money supply, and tariffs, were central. President Grover Cleveland, a Bourbon Democrat was pro-business and a staunch supporter of conservative measures such as the gold standard; he was strongest in the Northeast. Opposed to him were the agrarian and silver factions based in the South and West, which had been empowered after the Panic of 1893.

A two-thirds vote was required for the Democratic Party nomination and at the convention the silverites just barely had it despite the extreme regional polarization of the delegates. In a test vote on an anti-silver measure, the Eastern states (from Maryland to Maine), with 28% of the delegates voted 96% for gold. The delegates from the rest of the country voted 91% against gold, so the silverites controlled 67% of the delegates.

== Bryan moves up ==
Bryan was a talented orator. He gave speeches, organized meetings, and adopted resounding resolutions that eventually culminated in the founding of the American Bimetallic League, which then evolved into the National Bimetallic Union, and finally the National Silver Committee. At the time many inflationist farmers believed that by increasing the amount of currency in circulation, the crops they grew would receive higher prices. They were opposed by banks and bond holders who feared inflation, and by urban workers who feared inflation would further erode their purchasing power. The ultimate goal of the League was to garner support on a national level for the reinstatement of the coinage of silver.

With others, he made certain that the Democratic platform reflected the now strengthening spirit of the silverites. With his support, Charles H. Jones, of the St Louis Post-Dispatch, was put on the platform committee and Bryan's plank for free silver was adopted sixteen to one and silently added to the Chicago Democratic Platform, in order to avoid controversy. As a minority member of the resolutions committee, Bryan was able to push the Democratic Party from its laissez-faire and small government roots towards its modern, interventionist character. Through these measures, the public and influential Democrats became convinced of his capacity to lead and bring change, resulting in his being mentioned as a possible chairman for the Chicago convention. Bryan delivered speeches across the country for free silver from 1894 to 1896, building a grass-roots reputation as a powerful champion of the cause.

At the 1896 convention, Bryan lambasted Eastern moneyed classes for supporting the gold standard at the expense of the average worker. His "Cross of Gold" speech made him the sensational new face in the Democratic party. At the start of the convention, former Missouri Congressman Richard P. Bland, a strong supporter of bimetallism, was viewed as the favorite. However, Bland was strongly opposed by many in the South, in part because his wife and daughter were Catholics. Some bimetallist supporters tried to draft Republican Senator Henry M. Teller of Colorado, but his candidacy never got off the ground.

Several state delegations, mostly from the Northeast, supported the gold standard and refused to take part in the nomination process. Many conservative Democrats looked to former Senator David B. Hill of New York or Governor William Russell of Massachusetts for leadership, but Russell was in poor health and Hill did not gain support for a presidential bid. Eight names were placed in nomination: Richard P. Bland, William J. Bryan, Claude Matthews, Horace Boies, Joseph Blackburn, John R. McLean, Robert E. Pattison, and Sylvester Pennoyer. The only major candidate that did support the gold standard was former Pennsylvania Governor Pattison. After five ballots, Bryan triumphed over Bland and Pattison. Bryan was also nominated for president by the Populist Party and the Silver Republican Party.

== Presidential nomination ==
=== Presidential candidates ===
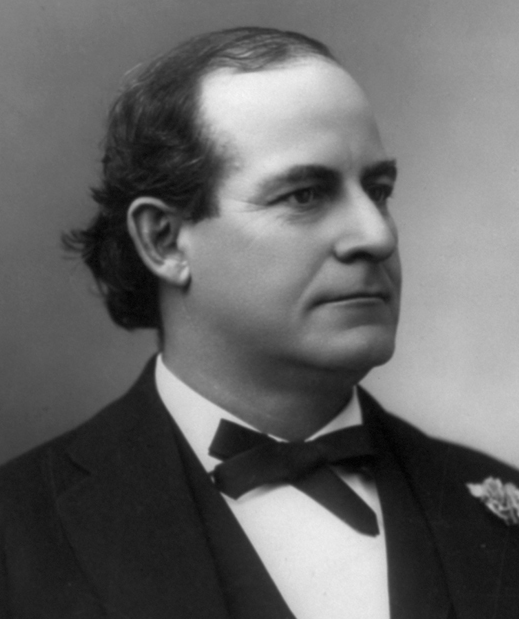
Former Representative William Jennings Bryan of Nebraska

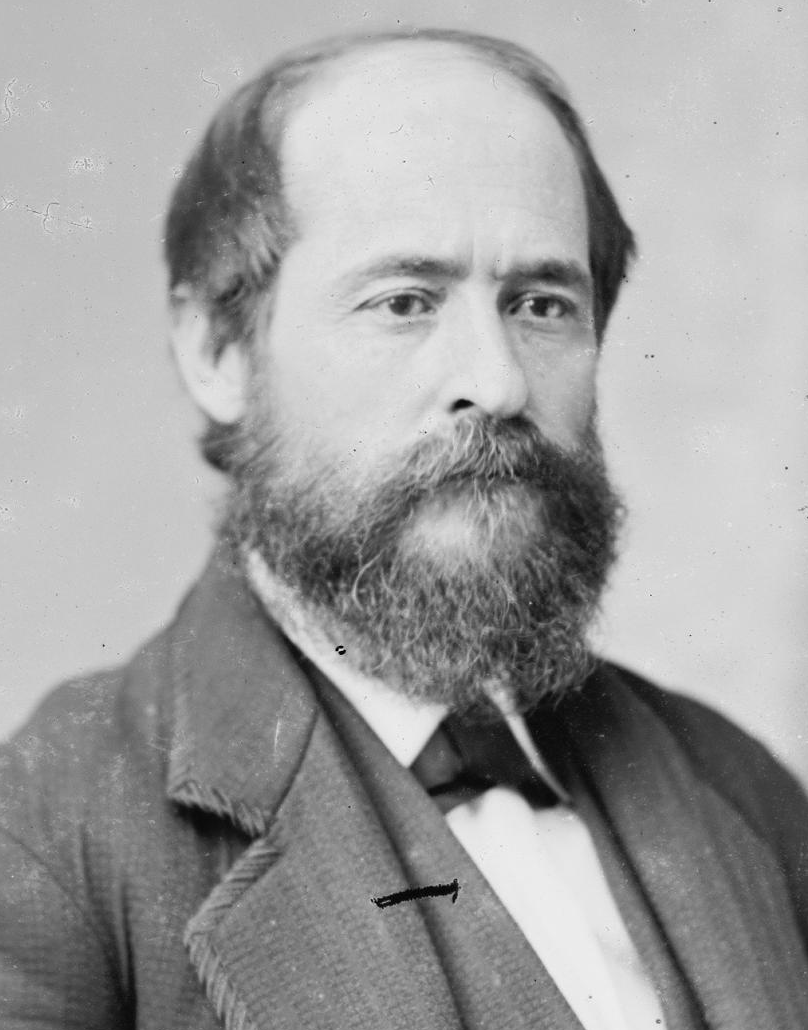
Former Representative Richard P. Bland of Missouri

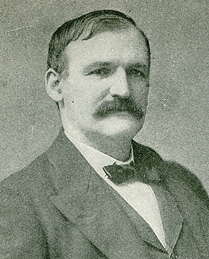
Former Governor Robert E. Pattison of Pennsylvania

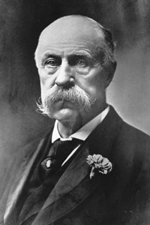
Senator Joseph Blackburn of Kentucky

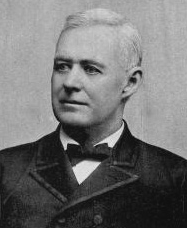
Former Governor Horace Boies of Iowa

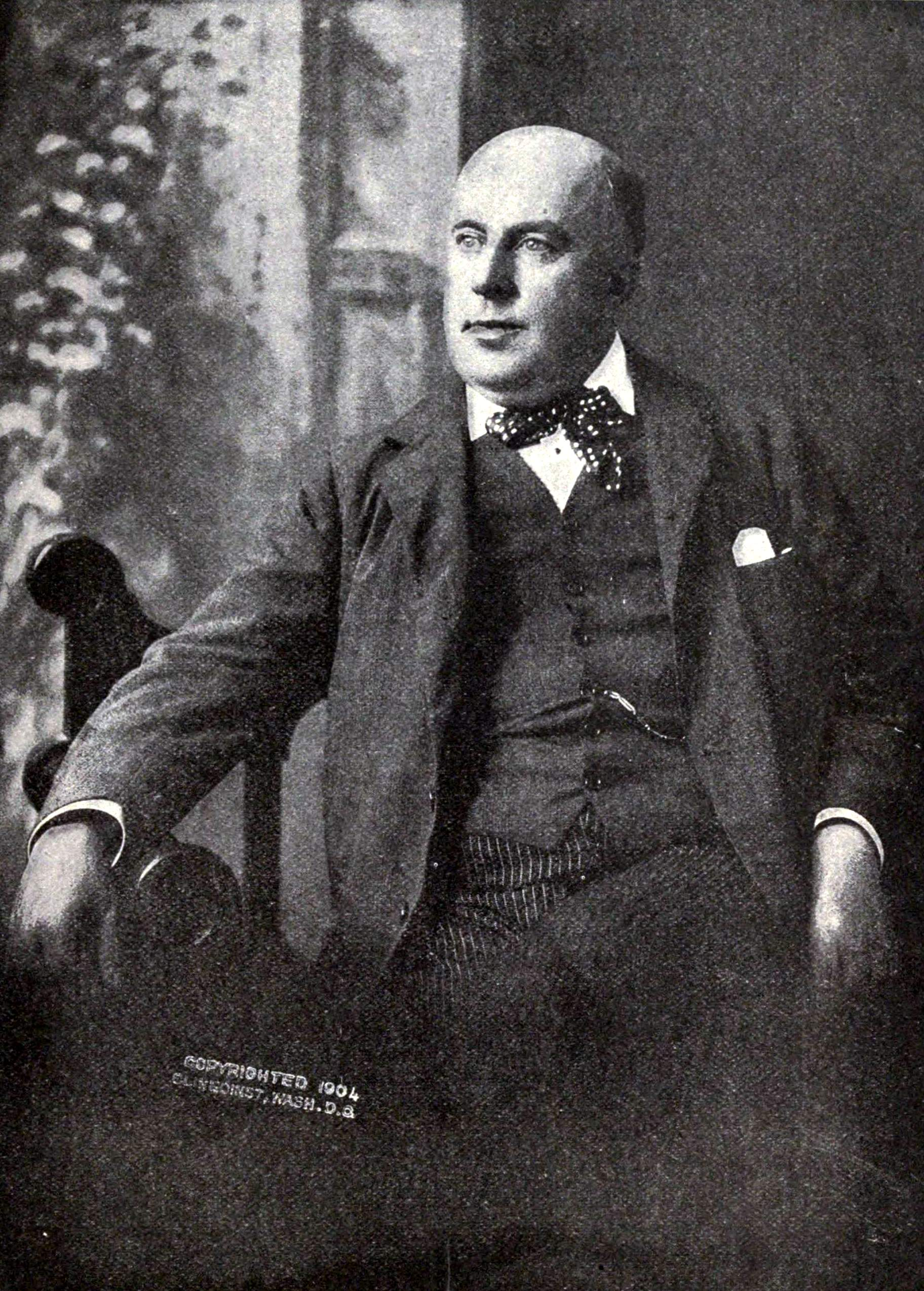
Newspaper Publisher John R. McLean of Ohio

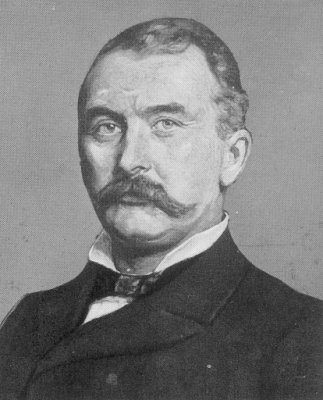
Governor Claude Matthews of Indiana

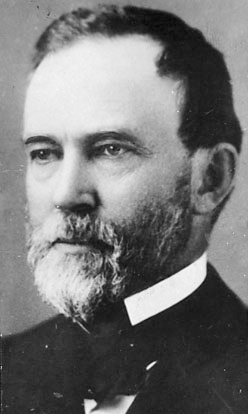
Former Governor Sylvester Pennoyer of Oregon

=== Declined ===
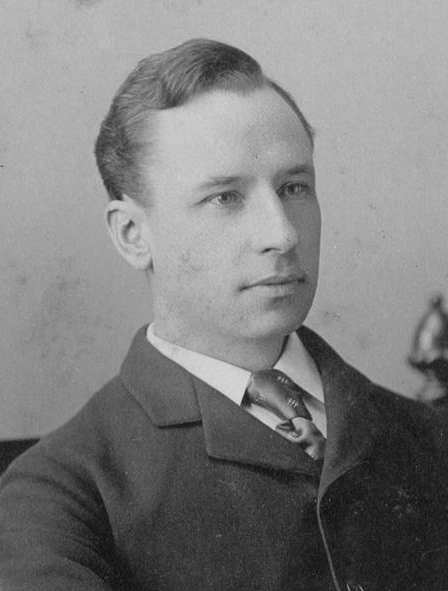
Former Governor William E. Russell of Massachusetts

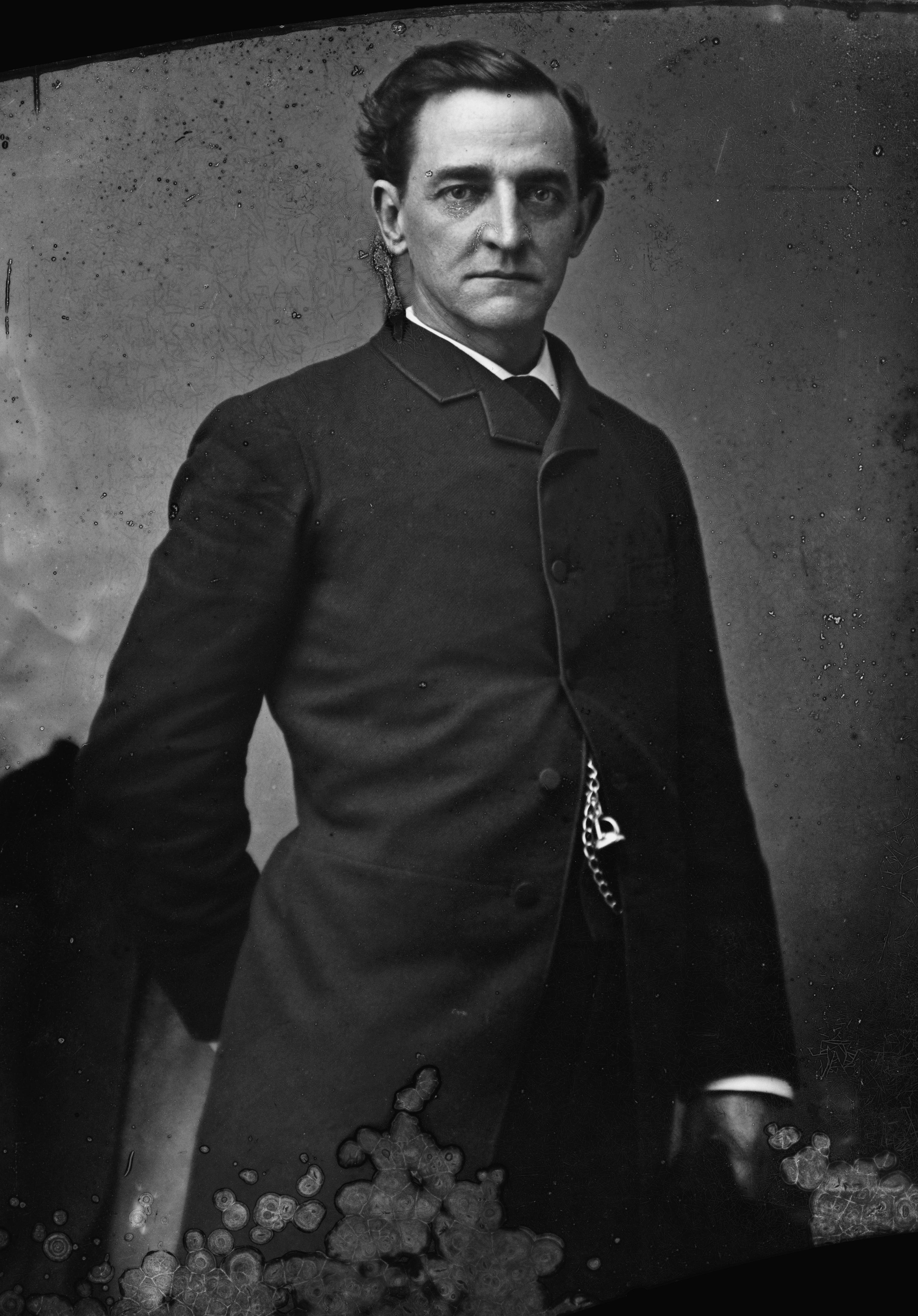
Senator John W. Daniel of Virginia

=== Not nominated ===
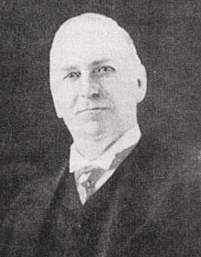
Former Representative Joseph C. Sibley of Pennsylvania

=== Balloting ===
Presidential Ballot
	1st	2nd	3rd	4th	5th	UN
Bryan	137	197	219	280	652	930
Bland	235	281	291	241	11	0
Pattison	97	100	97	97	95	0
Blackburn	82	41	27	27	0	0
Boies	67	37	36	33	0	0
McLean	54	53	54	46	0	0
Matthews	37	34	34	36	0	0
Tillman	17	0	0	0	0	0
Stevenson	6	10	9	8	8	0
Pennoyer	8	8	0	0	0	0
Teller	8	8	0	0	0	0
Russell	2	0	0	0	0	0
Hill	1	1	1	1	1	0
Campbell	1	0	0	0	0	0
Turpie	0	0	0	0	1	0
Blank	178	160	162	161	162	0

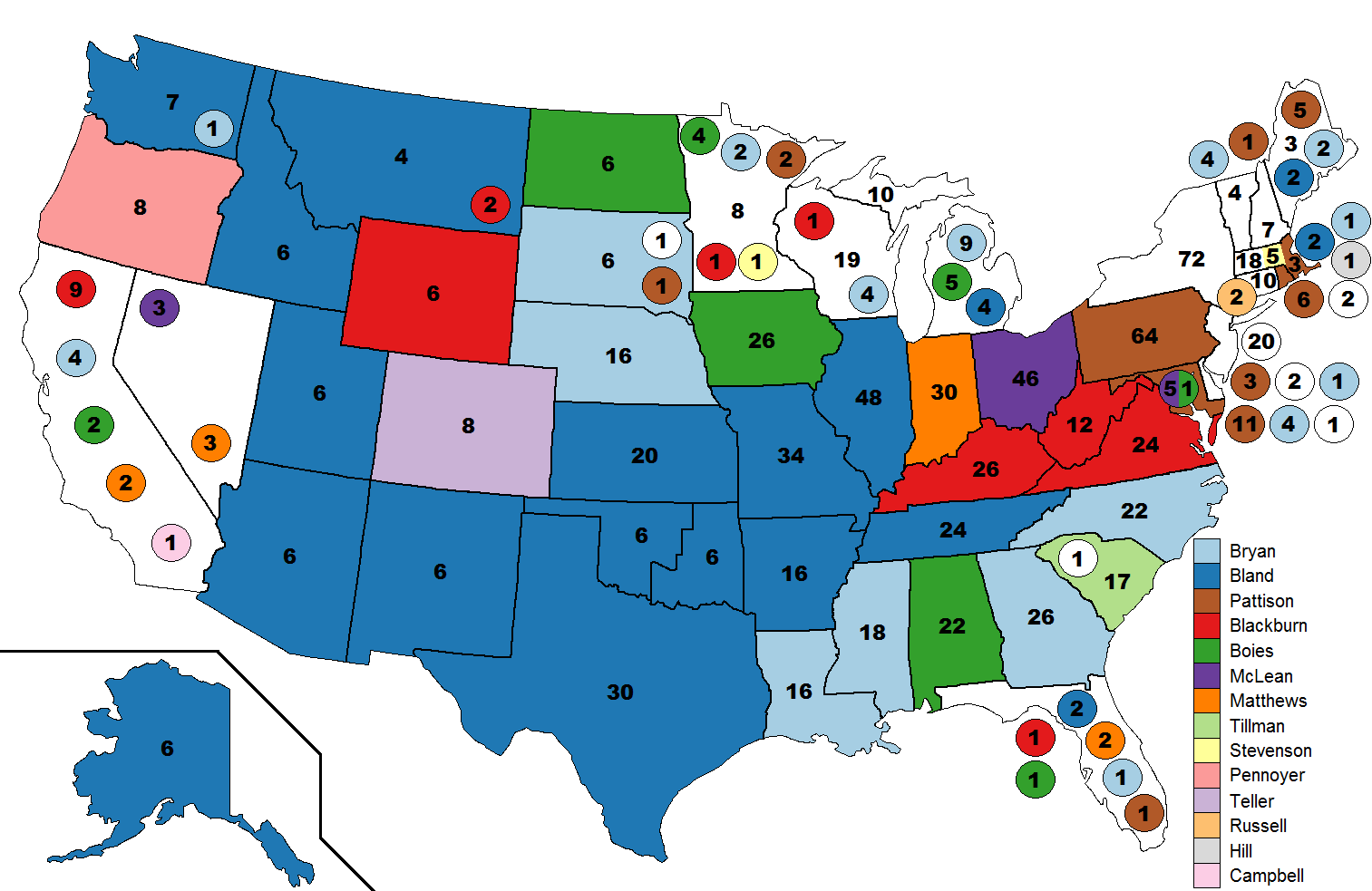
1st Presidential Ballot

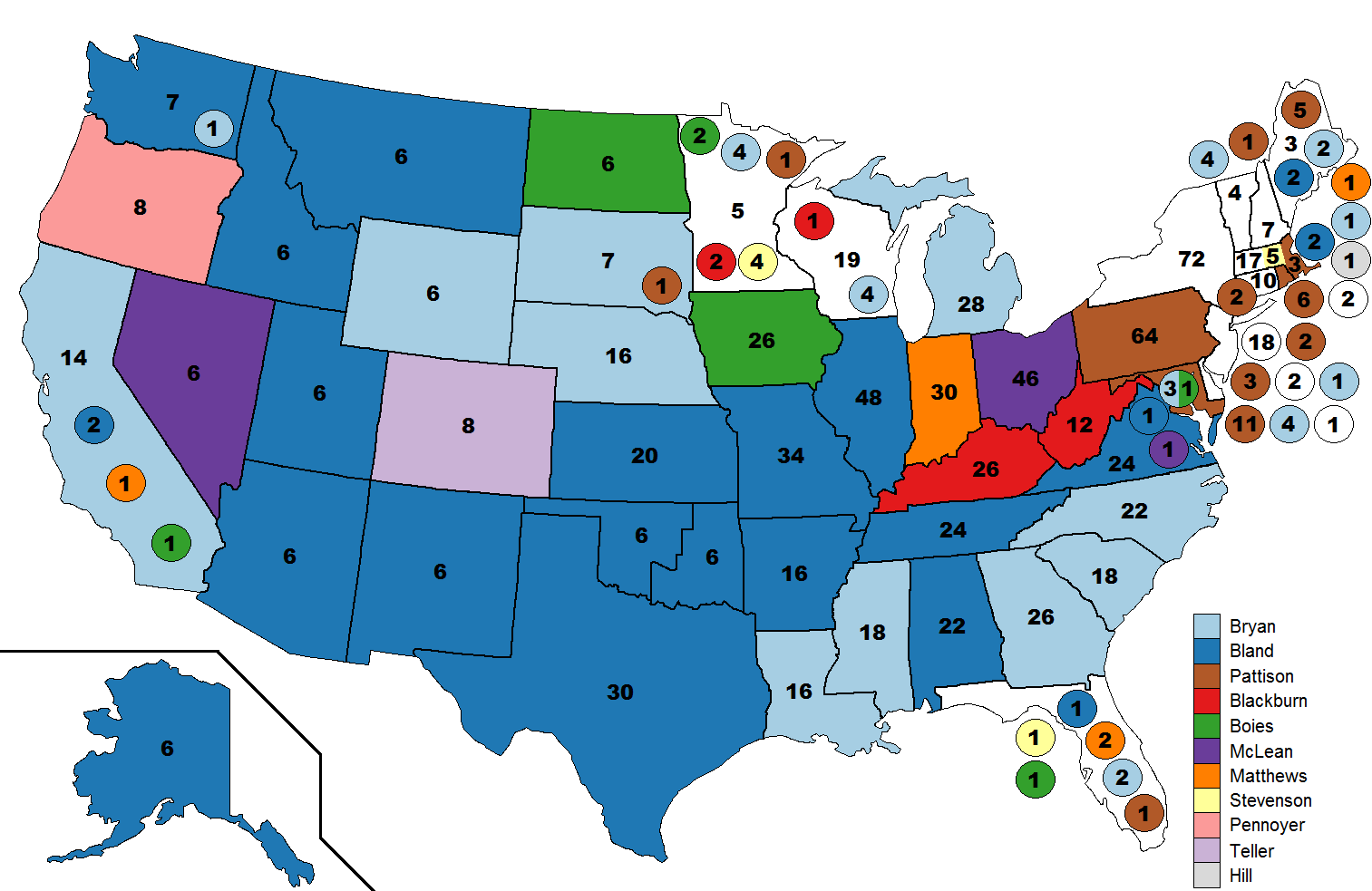
2nd Presidential Ballot

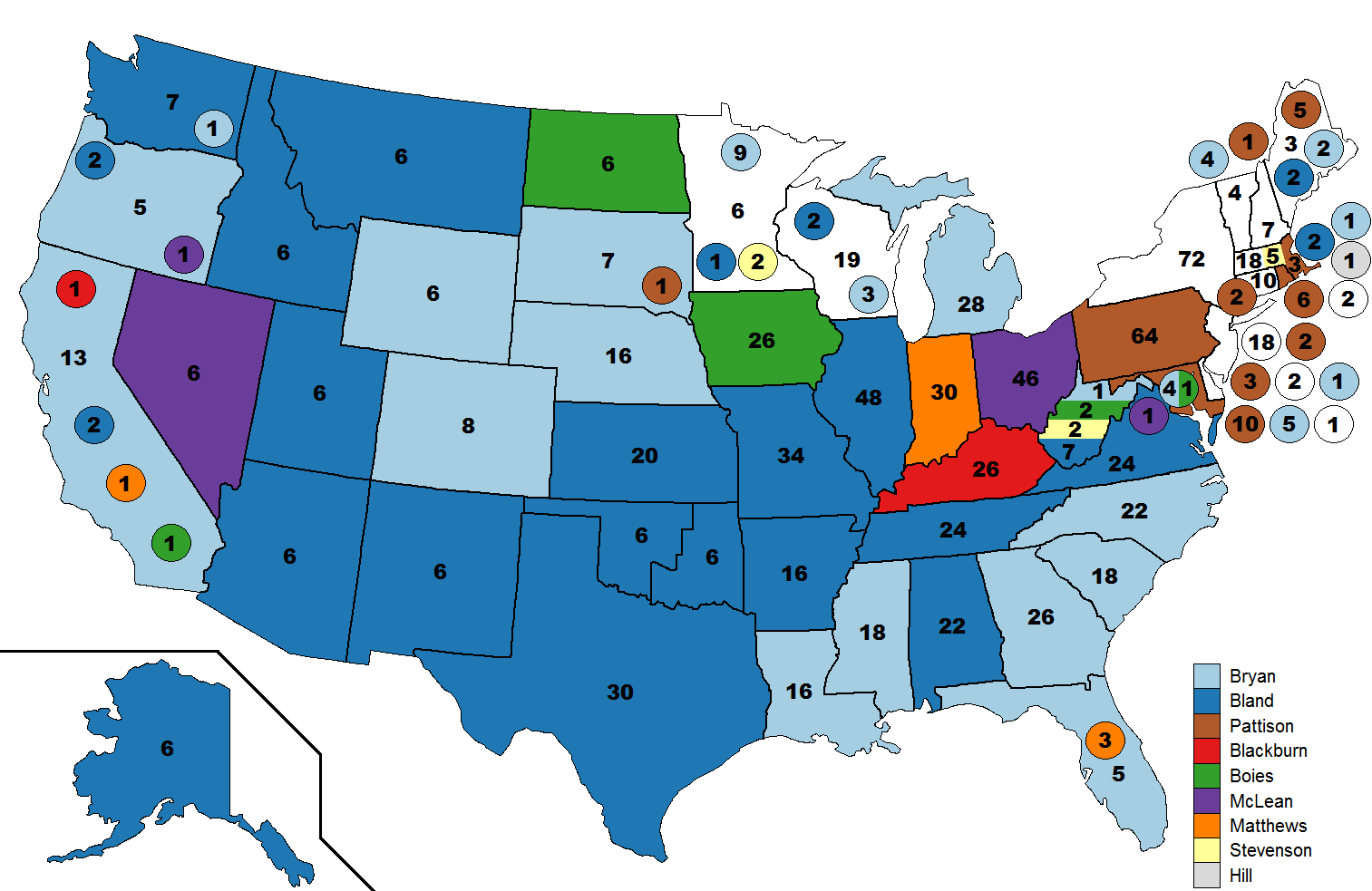
3rd Presidential Ballot

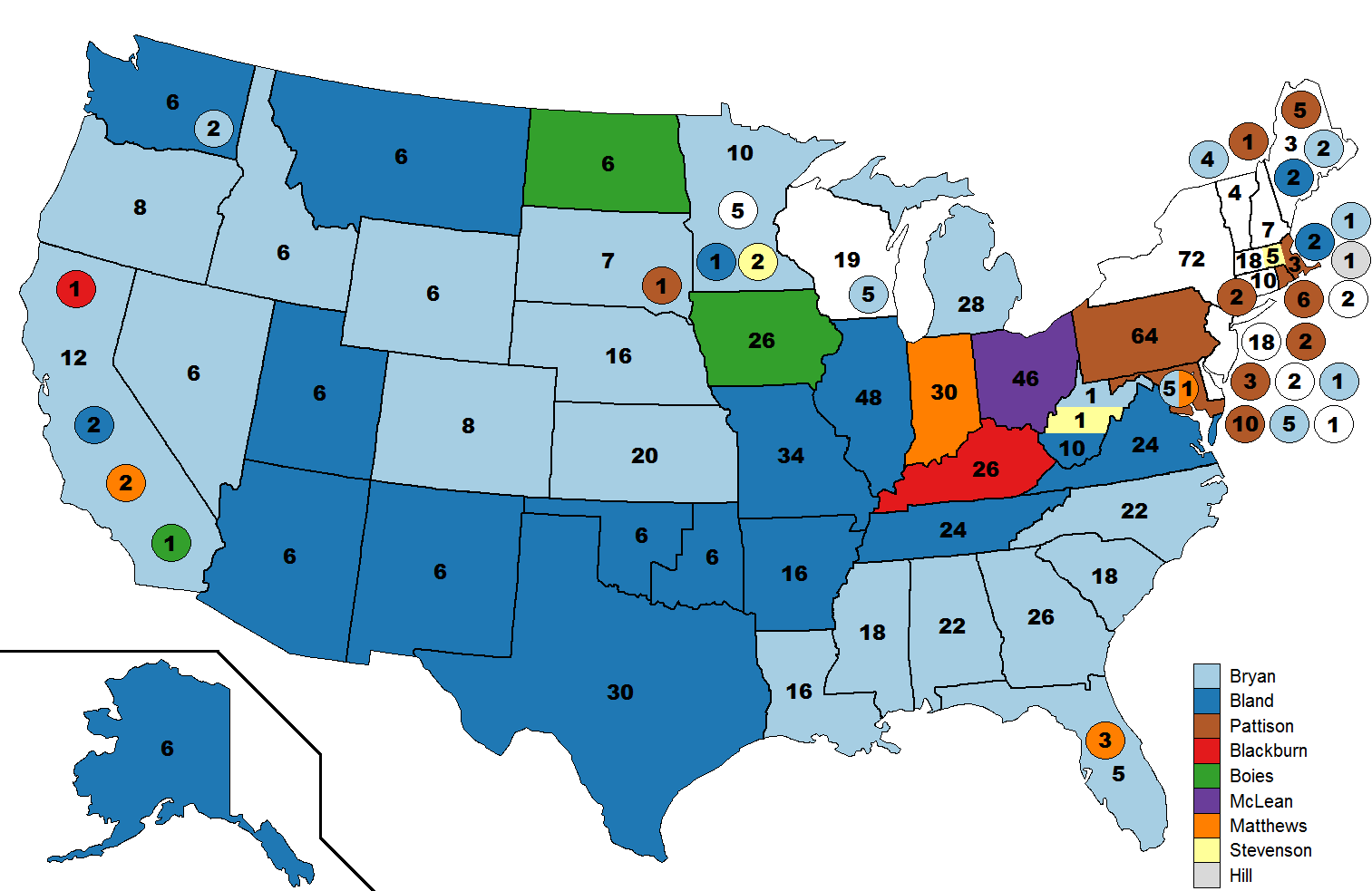
4th Presidential Ballot

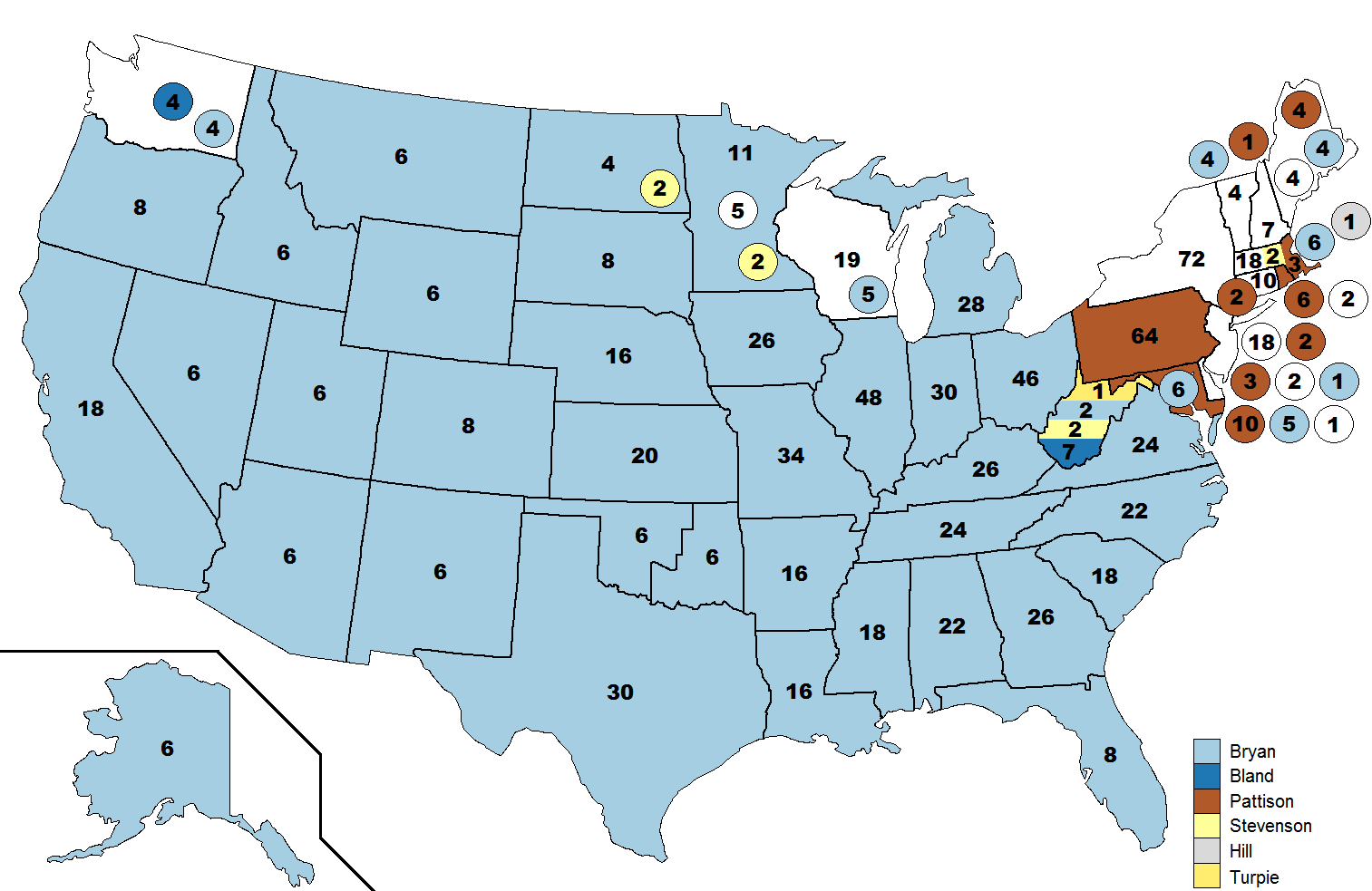
5th Presidential Ballot

== Vice Presidential nomination ==
After the selection of Bryan, the convention turned its attention to picking a running mate. Newspaper publisher John Roll McLean of Ohio was viewed as a possible candidate, in part because his fortune could help fund the ticket. Former Representative George F. Williams of Massachusetts, businessman Arthur Sewall of Maine, and former Attorney General Augustus Hill Garland of Arkansas were all mentioned as possible candidates.

Eight names were placed in nomination: Arthur Sewall, John R. McLean, Joseph C. Sibley, George F. Williams, Walter Clark, J. Hamilton Lewis, George W. Fithian, and Sylvester Pennoyer. After being placed in nomination, McLean, Sibley, and Fithian made it known to the convention that they were not candidates for the vice presidency. Sewall ultimately received the nomination on the fifth ballot. The Populist Party and the Silver Republican Party also both nominated Bryan for president, but the Populists nominated former Georgia Representative Thomas E. Watson instead of Sewell.

=== Vice Presidential candidates ===
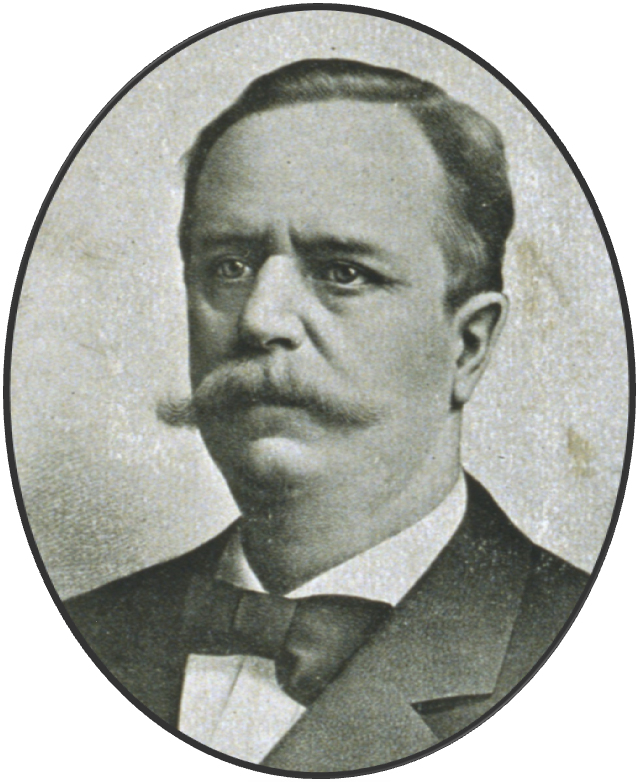
President of the Maine Central Railroad Arthur Sewall of Maine

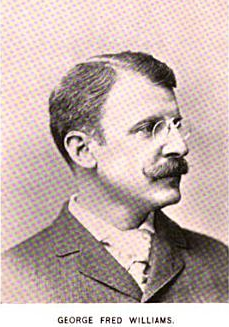
Former Representative George F. Williams of Massachusetts

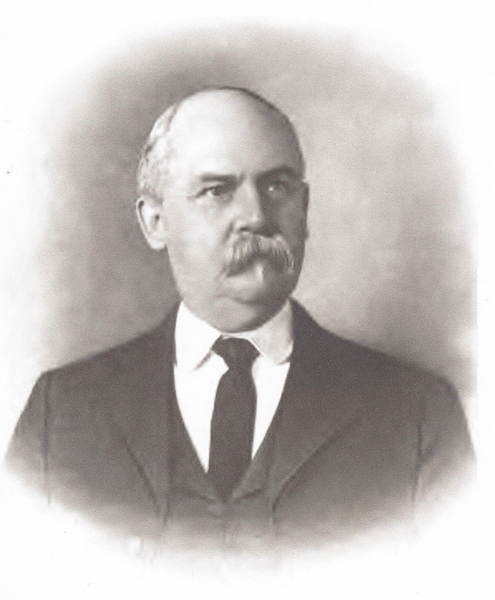
State Associate Justice Walter Clark of North Carolina

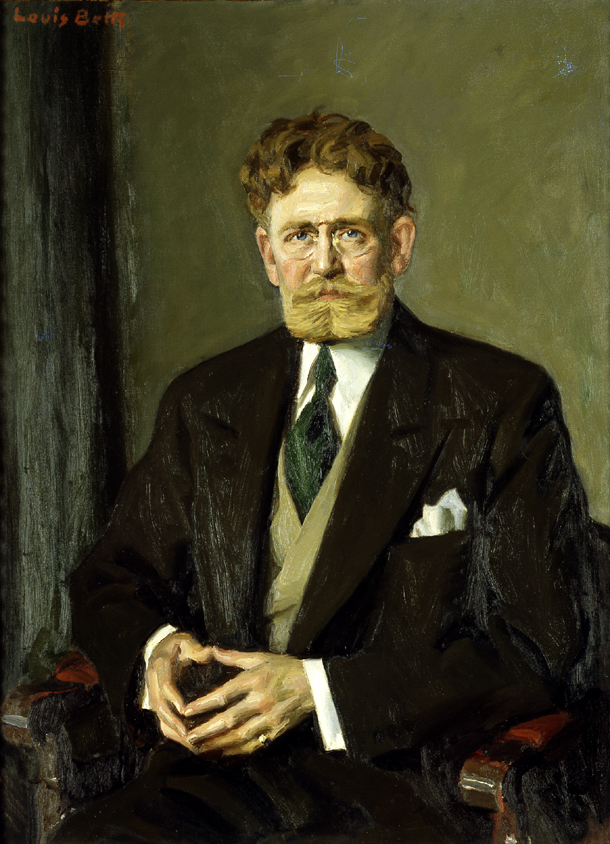
Representative Nominee J. Hamilton Lewis of Washington (Ineligible, not yet 35 years of age)

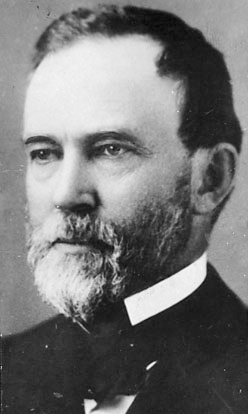
Former Governor Sylvester Pennoyer of Oregon

=== Declined ===
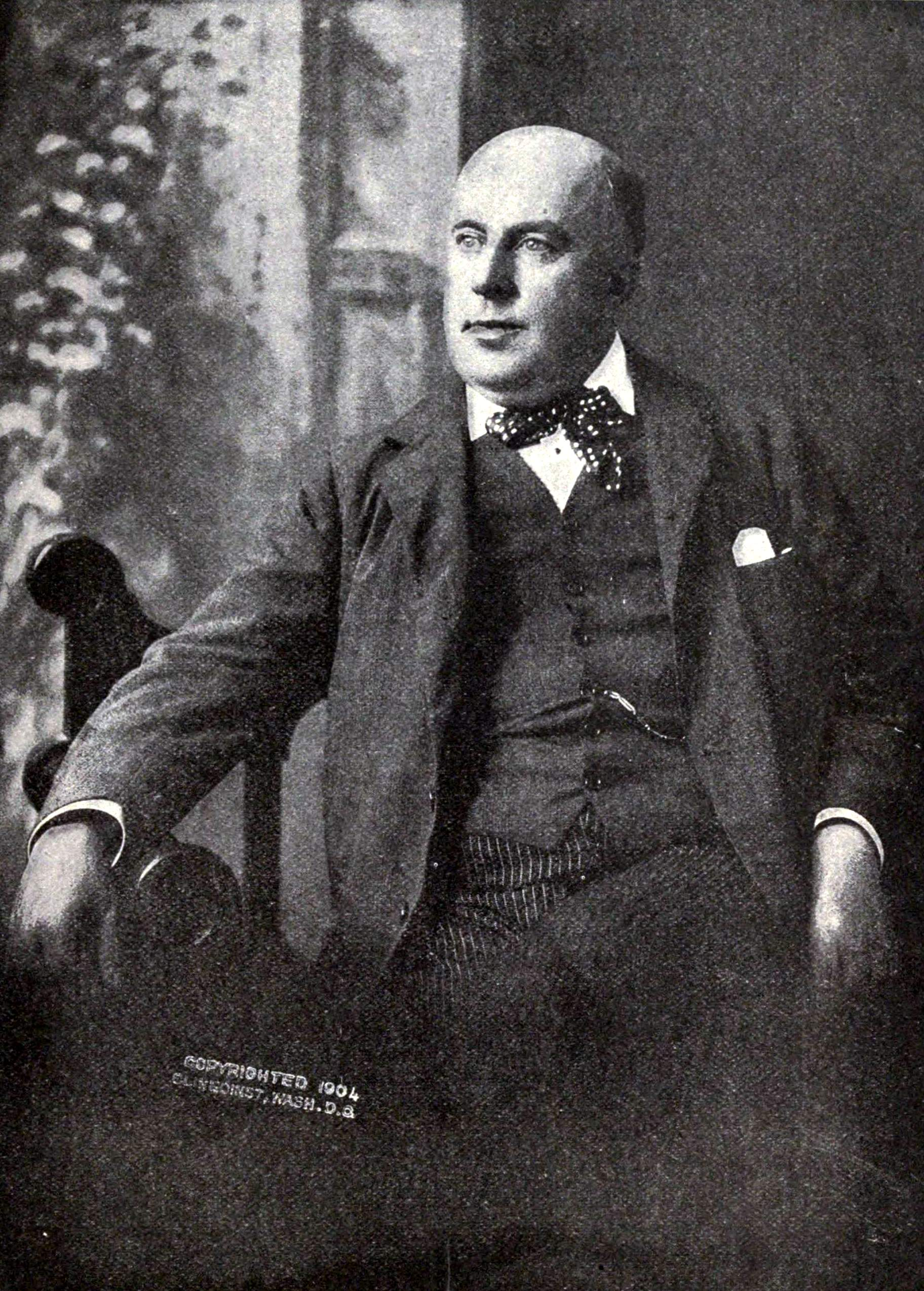
Newspaper Publisher John R. McLean of Ohio

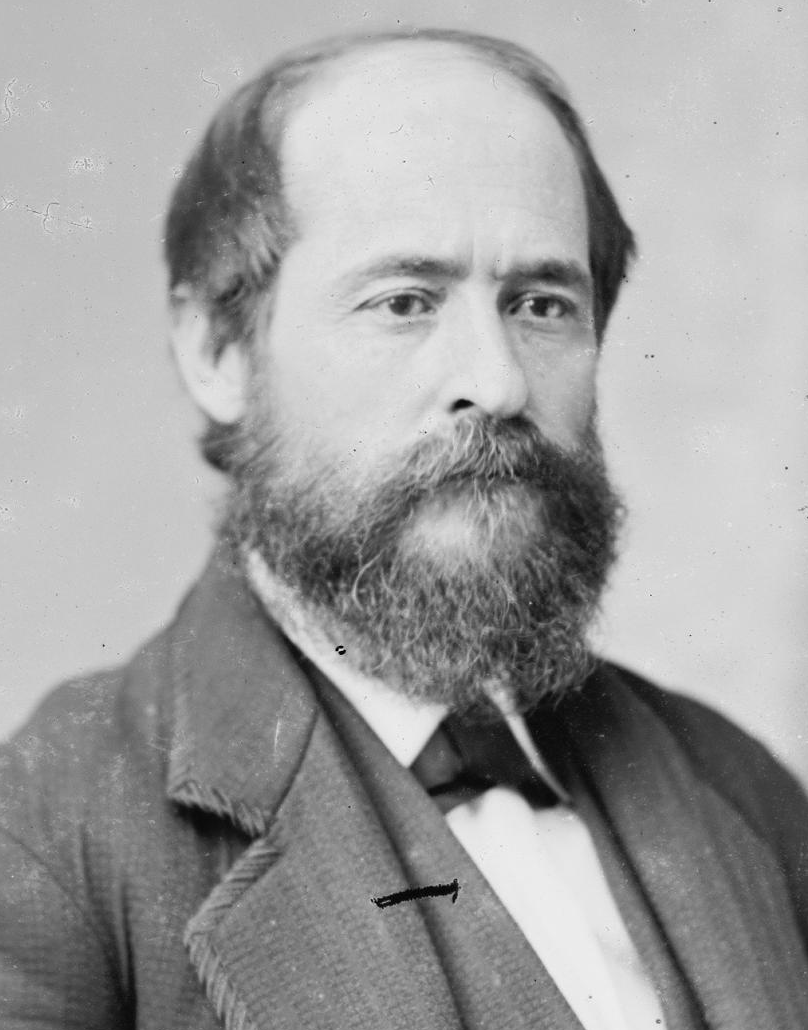
Former Representative Richard P. Bland of Missouri

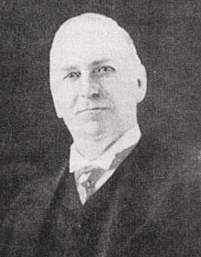
Former Representative Joseph C. Sibley of Pennsylvania

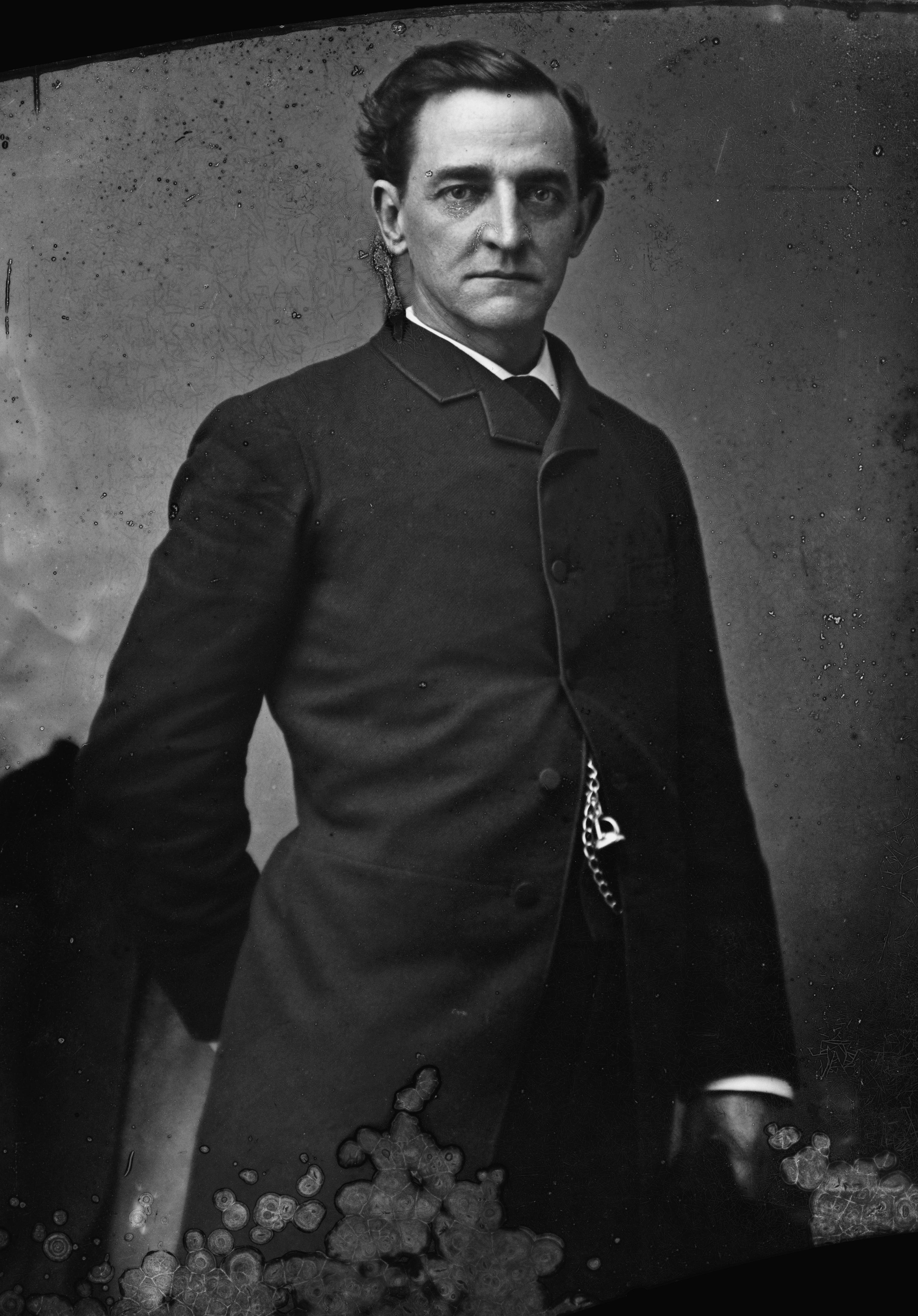
Senator John W. Daniel of Virginia

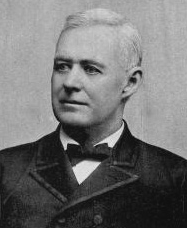
Former Governor Horace Boies of Iowa

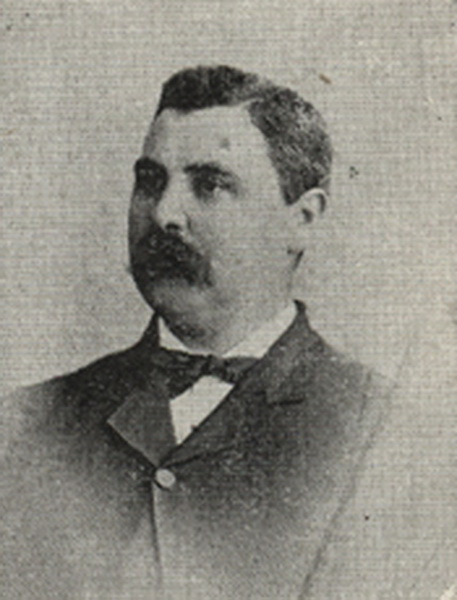
Former Representative George W. Fithian of Illinois

=== Balloting ===
Vice Presidential Ballot
	1st	2nd	3rd	4th	5th	UN
Sewall	100	37	97	261	568	930
McLean	111	158	210	298	32	0
Bland	62	294	255	0	0	0
Sibley	163	113	50	0	0	0
G.F. Williams	76	16	15	9	9	0
Daniel	11	0	6	54	36	0
Clark	50	22	22	46	22	0
J. Williams	22	13	0	0	0	0
Harrity	19	21	19	11	11	0
Blackburn	20	0	0	0	0	0
Boies	20	0	0	0	0	0
Lewis	11	0	0	0	0	0
Pattison	2	1	1	1	1	0
Fithian	1	0	0	0	0	0
Teller	1	0	0	0	0	0
White	1	0	0	0	0	0
Blank	260	255	255	250	251	0

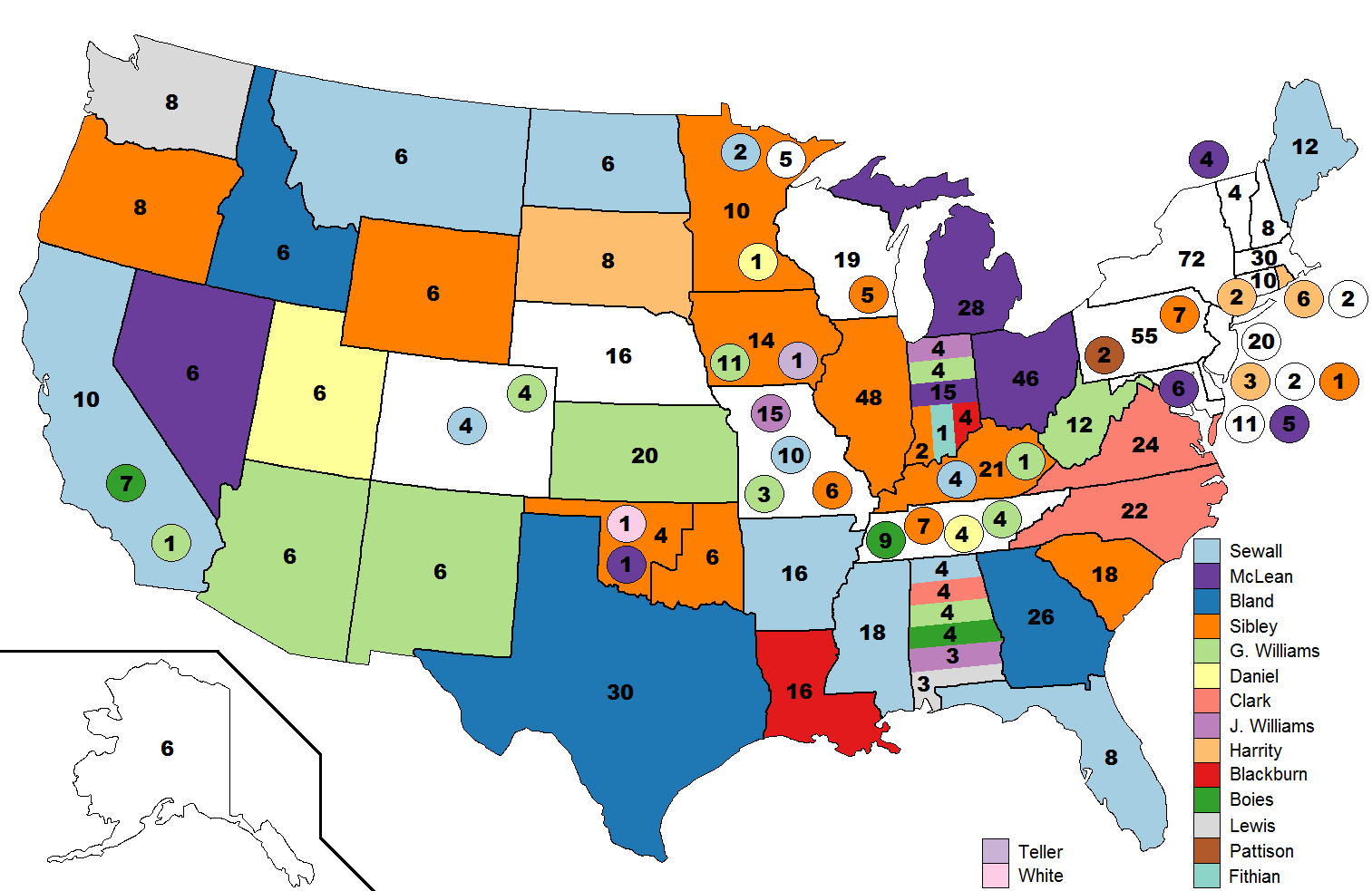
1st Presidential Ballot

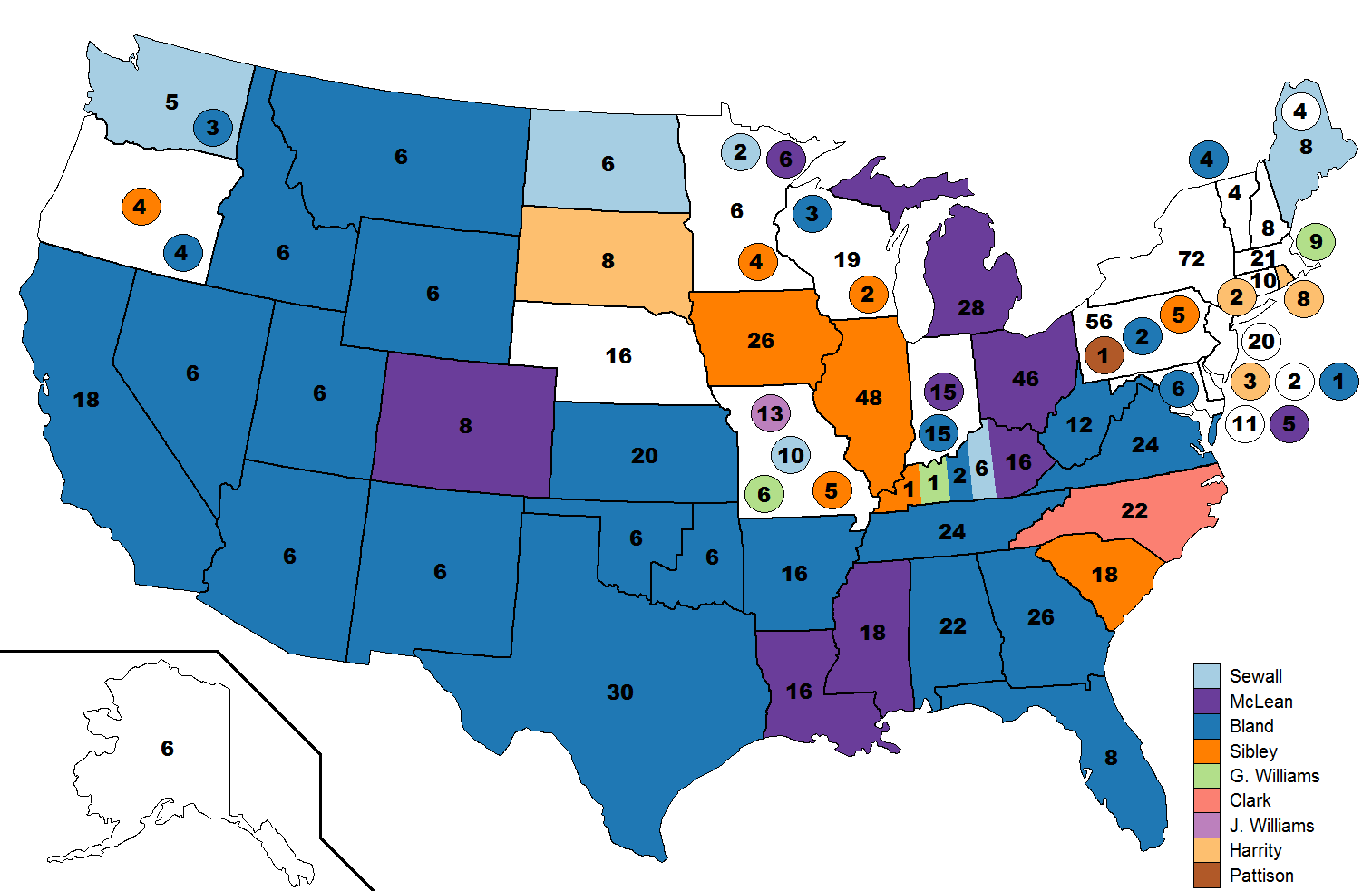
2nd Presidential Ballot

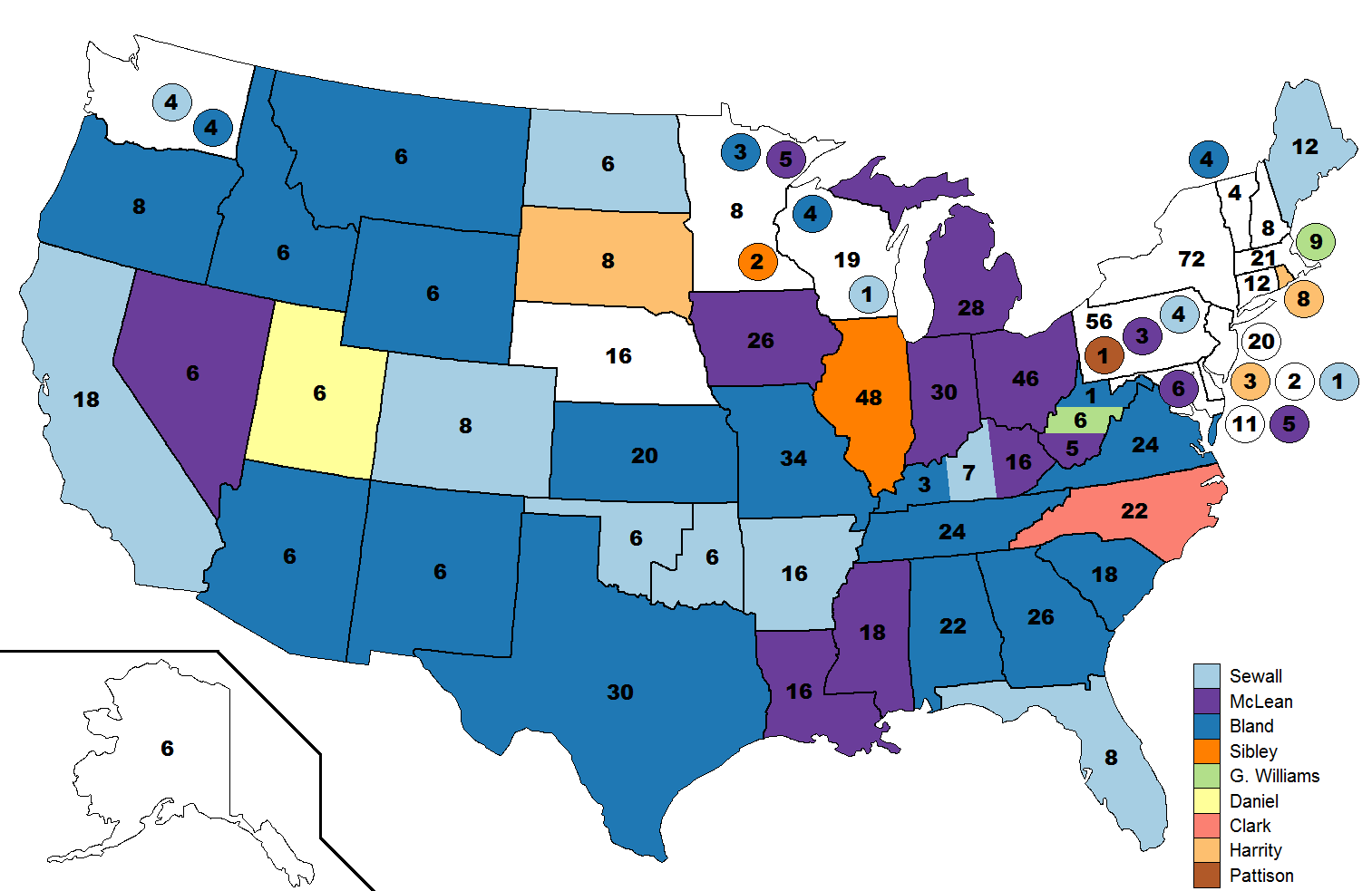
3rd Presidential Ballot

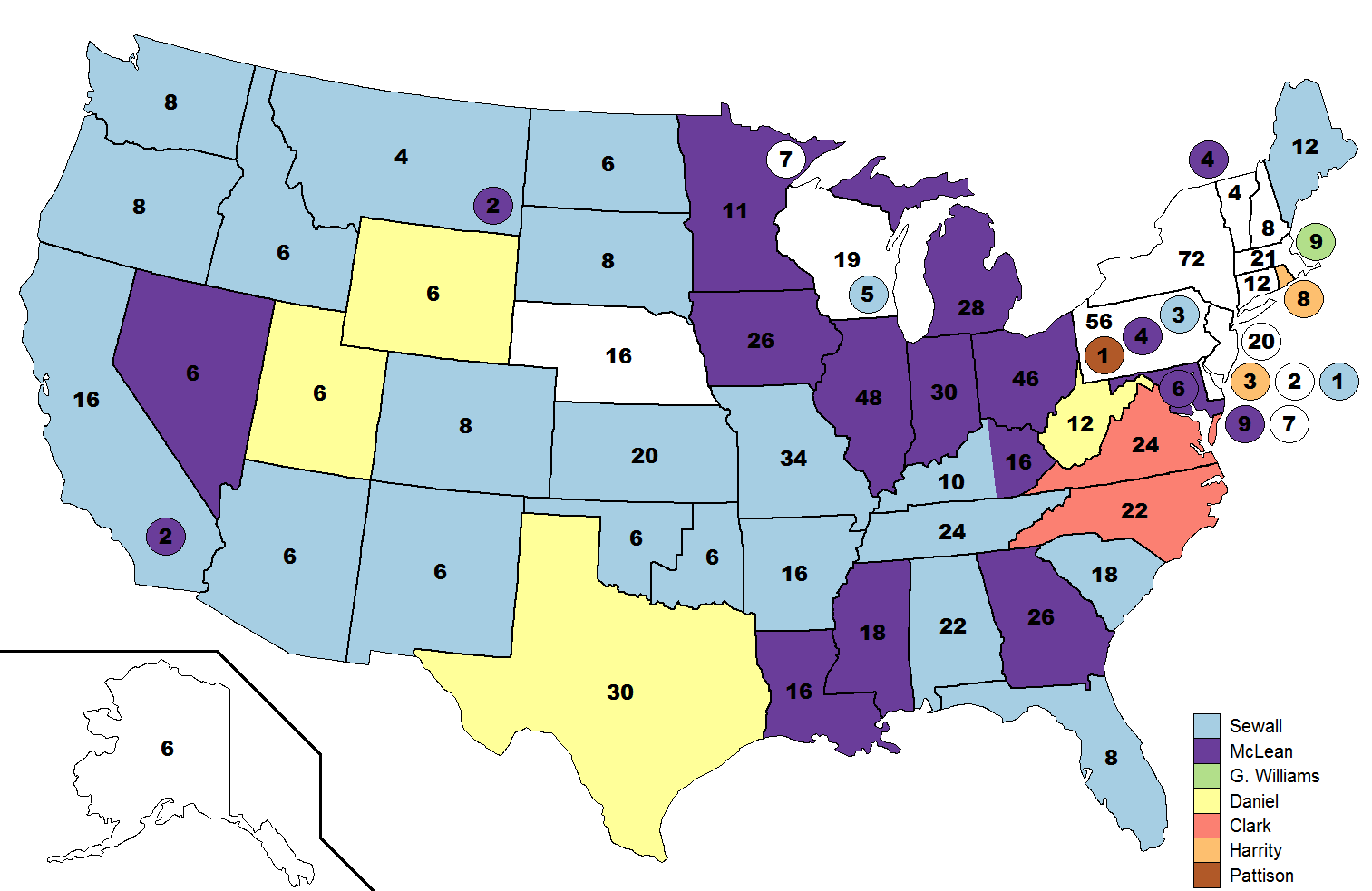
4th Presidential Ballot

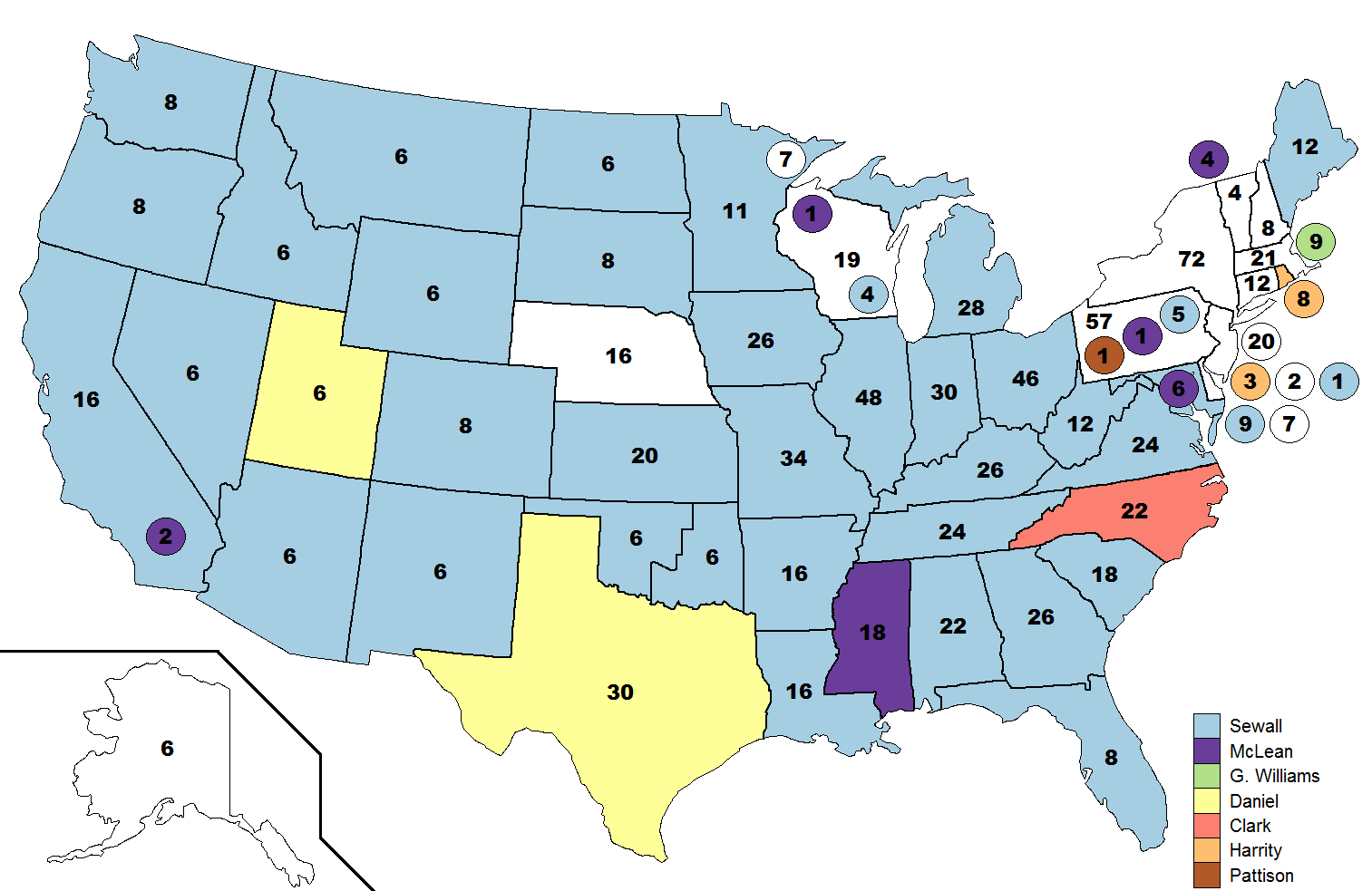
5th Presidential Ballot

== See also ==
- History of the United States Democratic Party
- 1896 United States presidential election
- 1896 Republican National Convention
- 1896 National Democratic National Convention –"Gold Democrat" splinter convention
- 1896 Prohibition National Convention
- List of Democratic National Conventions
- U.S. presidential nomination convention
- William Jennings Bryan presidential campaign, 1896

Preceded by 1892; Chicago, Illinois	Democratic National Conventions	Succeeded by 1900; Kansas City, Missouri
