= 1892 Prohibition National Convention =

American political convention

- 1892 presidential election
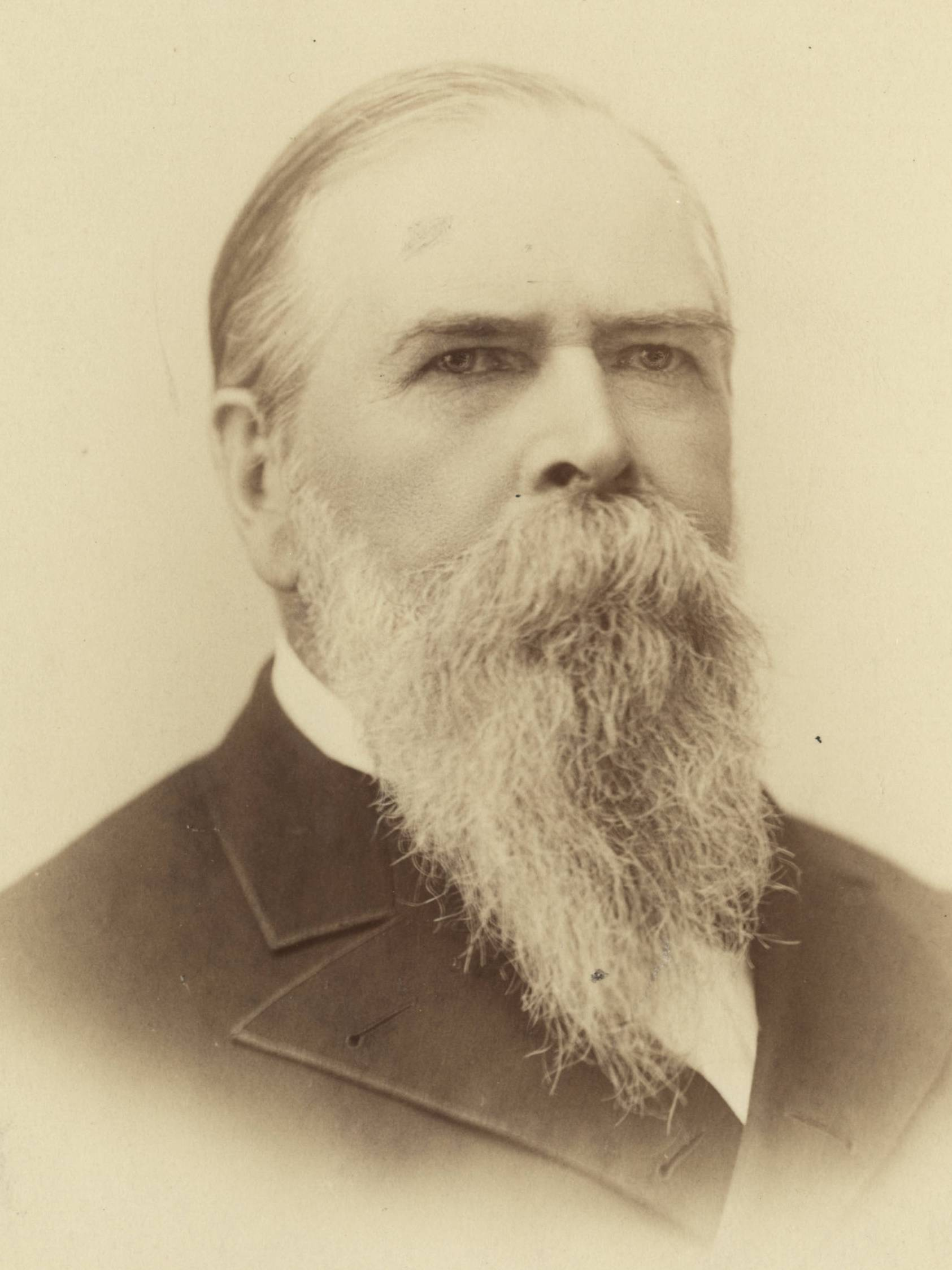
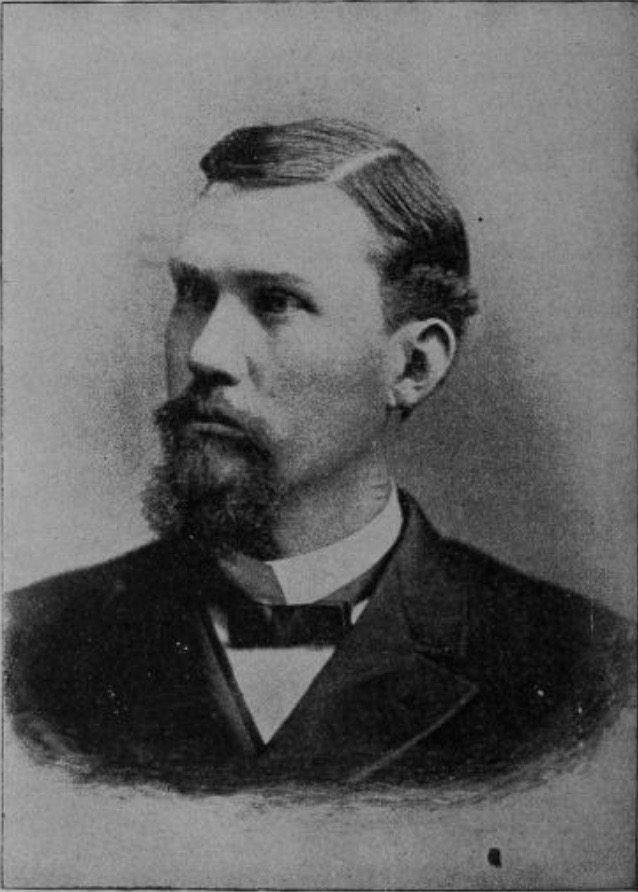
- Nominees (Bidwill & Cranfill)

Convention
- Dates: June 29–30, 1892
- City: Cincinnati, Ohio
- Venue: Music Hall
- Chair: Eli Ritter of Indiana

Candidates
- Presidential nominee: John Bidwell of California
- Vice-presidential nominee: James B. Cranfill of Texas

The 1892 Prohibition National Convention was held June 29–30, 1892, at Music Hall in Cincinnati, Ohio. It nominated John Bidwell for president and James B. Cranfill for vice president.

== Background ==
Ahead of the convention, there was disagreement within the party as to whether the party should engage in electoral fusion or nominate its own ticket. Frances Willard led a faction of the party that sought fusion with the newly-founded Populist Party (People's Party). John St. John, however, led a prevailing faction of the party that was opposed to the concessions that would need to be made to strike a fusion agreement. Despite these disagreements within the party, there were expectations at the time of the that the party could be a major breakout national election for the Prohibition, seeing it score a significant share of the vote and establish itself as a significant factor in national elections.

== Logistics ==
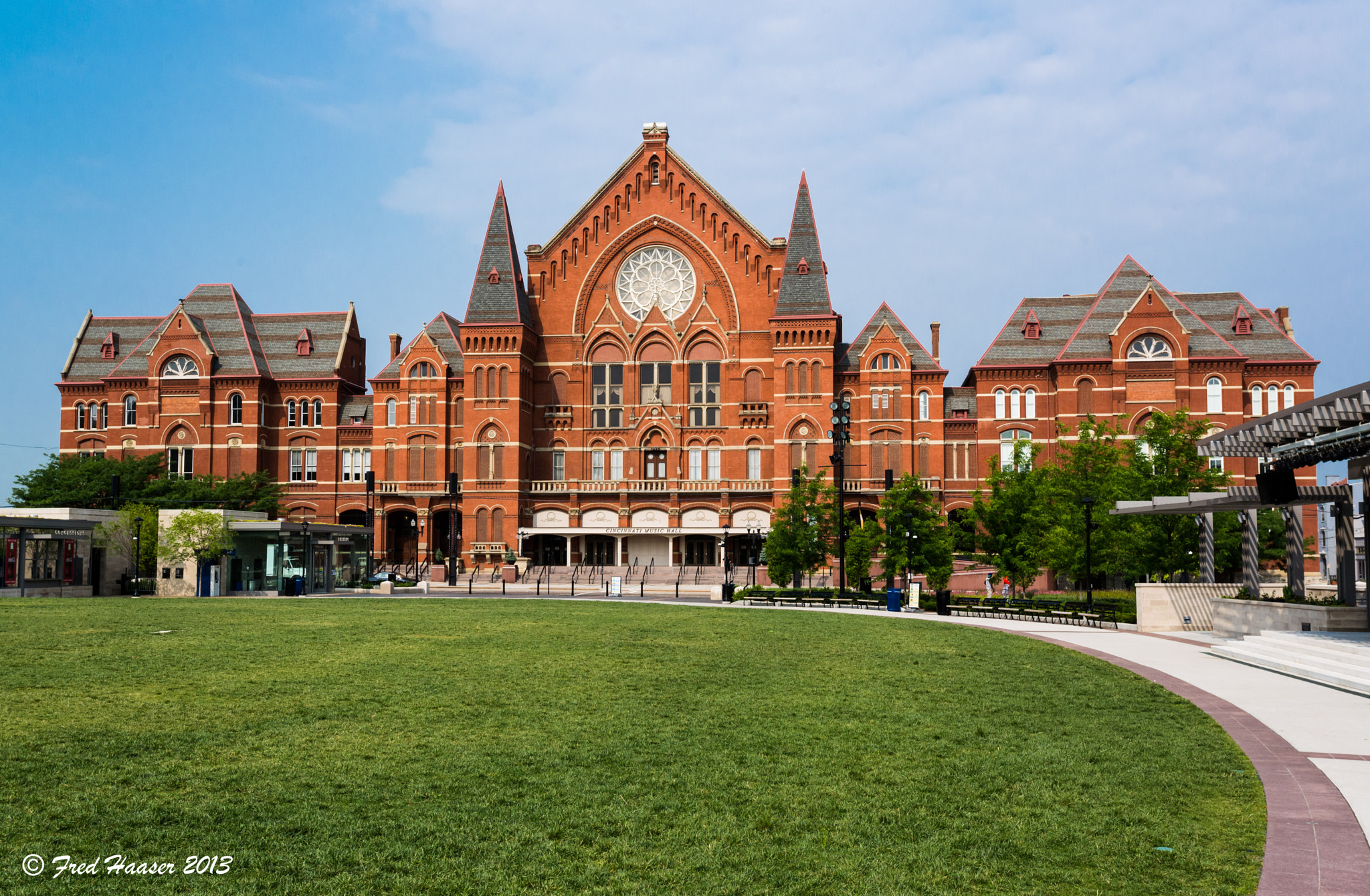
Cincinnati Music Hall, venue of the convention (photographed in 2013)

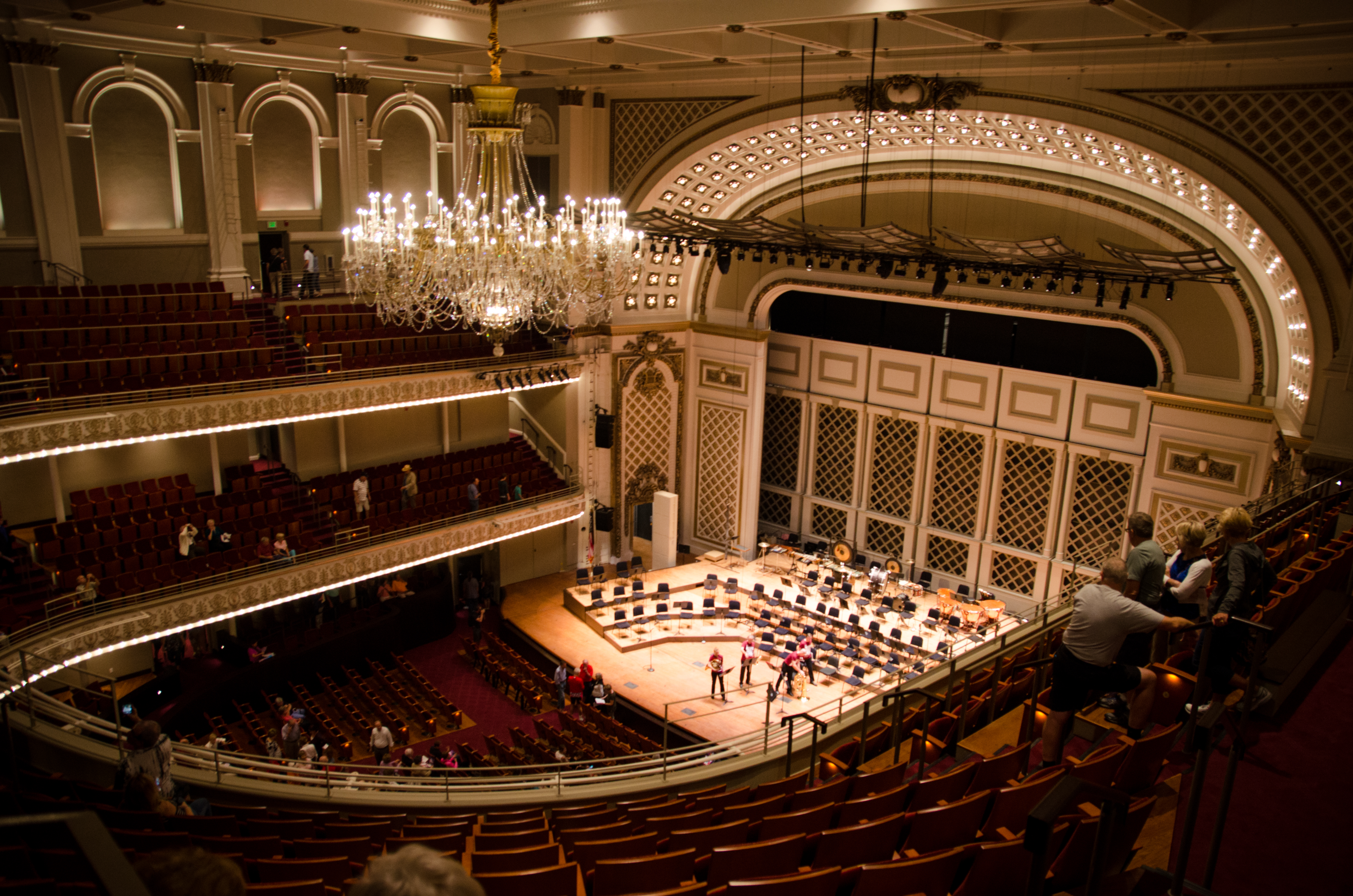
Interior of the Cincinnati Music Hall, venue of the convention (photographed in 2017)

The sixth Prohibition Party National Convention assembled at Music Hall in Cincinnati, Ohio from June 29 to 30, 1892. There were 972 delegates present from all states except Louisiana and South Carolina.

Two major stories about the convention loomed before it assembled. In the first place, some members of the national committee sought a merger with the Populist Party. While there appeared a likelihood that the merger would materialize, it was clear that it was not going to happen by the time that the convention convened. Secondly, the southern states sent a number of black delegates. Cincinnati hotels refused to serve meals to blacks and whites at the same time, and several hotels refused service to the black delegates altogether.

=== Convention officers ===
John St. John served as temporary chairman at the opening of the convention. Eli Ritter of Indiana was appointed permanent chair during the opening session, and Sam Small was elected secretary. With contention, the convention voted to adopt a rule that only attending delegates could vote, prohibiting remote voting by absent delegates.

=== Convention hall decor ===
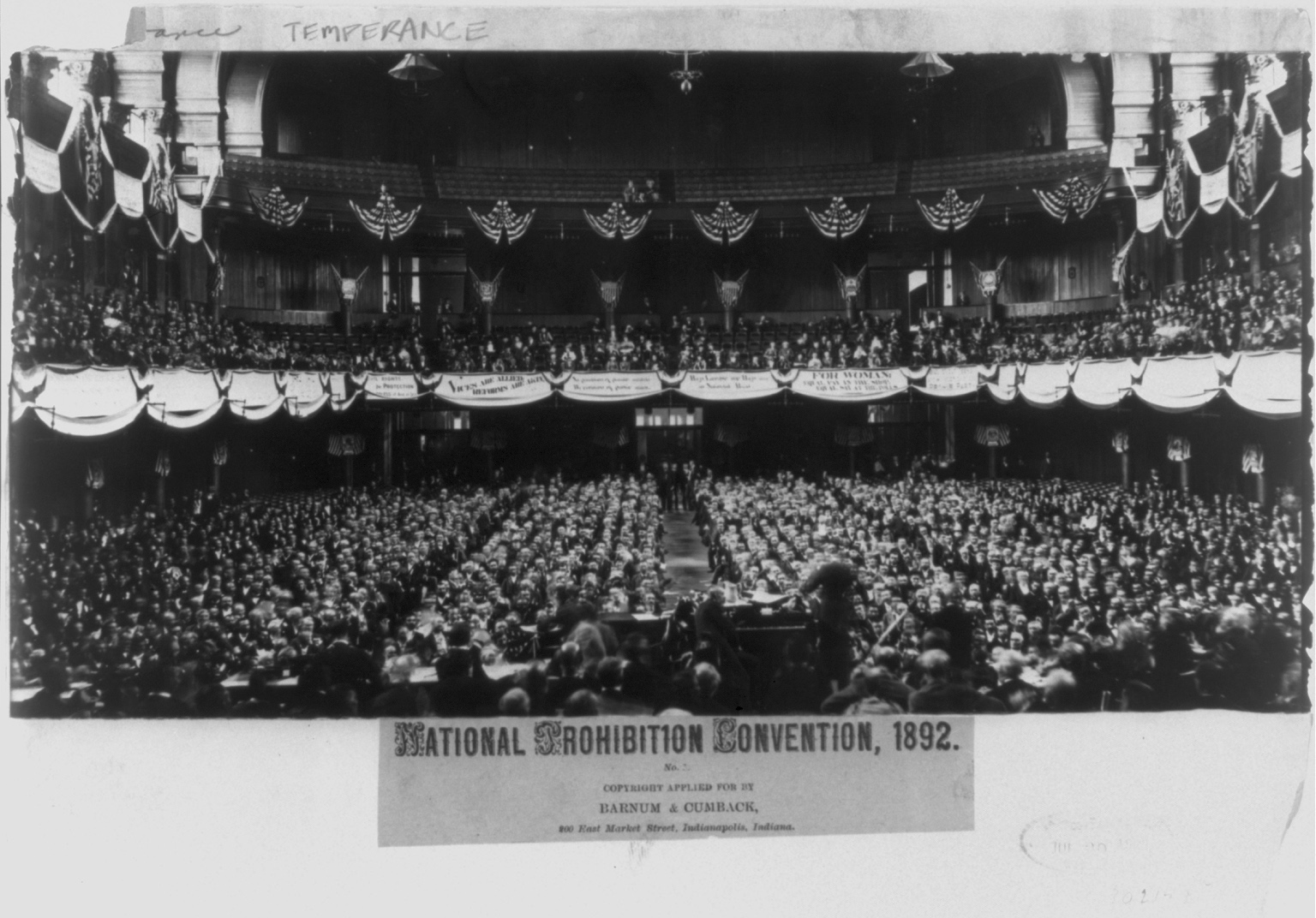
Photograph of the convention

Attendee ribbon from the convention

The venue was heavily decorated for the convention, with vast amounts of bunting adorning the spaces between interior pillars. The pillars themselves were each decorated with facsimile coat of arms for each state and territory of the United States, flanked on both sides by U.S. national flags. Decorations also included large portraits of well known temperance movement leaders, including St. John, Neal Dow, Frances Willard, General Fisk, James Black, A. B. Leonard, John B. Finch. Hanging in the hall was also a large flag made by a W.C.T.U. devotee, which had also flown for campaign events of the party's 1884 presidential campaign and 1886 New Jersey gubernatorial campaign, and which had also hung over the platform of the convention hall during the 1888 Prohibition convention four years earlier.

The railing of the venue's balcony was adorned by red, white, and blue bunting and by printed political mottos of the party such as, "Gin mills grind boys; wise?"; "A tariff in souls means free trade in souls"; and "License of evil complicity with crime".

== Presidential nomination ==
John Bidwell, Gideon T. Stewart, and William Jennings Demorest sought the party's presidential nomination and an opinion poll of delegates conducted by the New York Herald showed Bidwell with the most support. John St. John, the party's 1884 nominee, nominated Bidwell. Bidwell won the nomination on the first ballot. Prior to the convention, the race was thought to be close between Bidwell and Demorest, but the New York delegation became irritated with Demorest and voted for Bidwell 73–7. James B. Cranfill from Texas was nominated for vice-president on the first ballot with 417 votes to 351 for Joshua Levering from Maryland and 45 for others.

=== Presidential ballot ===
Candidates:

- John Bidwell, former U.S. representative from California
- Gideon T. Stewart, Prohibition Party Chairman from Ohio
- William Jennings Demorest, magazine publisher from New York

Presidential ballot
	1st ballot
John Bidwell	590
Gideon T. Stewart	179
William Jennings Demorest	139
H. Clay Bascom	3

== Vice presidential nomination ==
James B. Cranfill was nominated for vice president.

== Platform ==
The convention adopted a platform of populist reform, with alcohol prohibition remaining the party's main issue.

== Aftermath ==
Bidwell launched the ticket's general election campaign with a rally in San Francisco. While the party's vote total increased in 1892, the increase fell far short of the high expectations party activists had had of a breakthrough election. This result led some in the party to lose faith in the party's electoral prospects and pivot to different avenues of advancing the cause of adopting national prohibition. The 1892 election is regarded to have been the party's electoral peak.
