= Joshua Levering =

American politician (1845–1935)

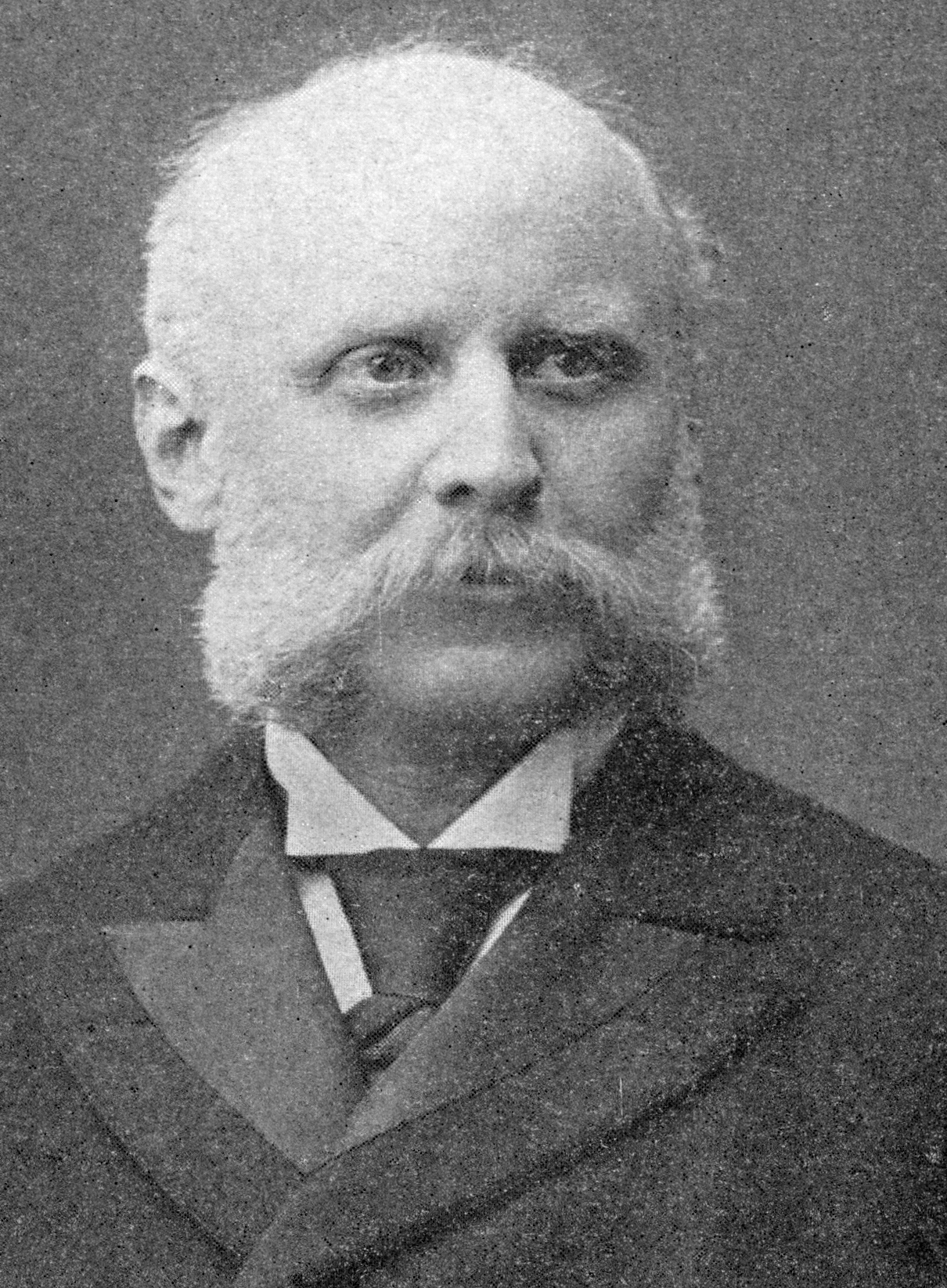

Personal details
- Born: September 12, 1845 Baltimore, Maryland, U.S.
- Died: October 6, 1935 (aged 90) Baltimore, Maryland, U.S.
- Party: Prohibition (1884–1935)
- Other political affiliations: Democratic (Before 1884)
- Spouse(s): Martha W. Keyser; Margaret S. Keyser; Helen Woods
- Children: 7
- Parents: Eugene Levering (father); Ann S. Levering (mother)

Joshua Levering (September 12, 1845 - October 6, 1935) was a prominent Baptist and a candidate for president of the United States in 1896. He was president of the trustees of The Southern Baptist Theological Seminary in Louisville, Kentucky, president of the Southern Baptist Convention, co-founder of the American Baptist Educational Society, and co-founder of the Layman's Missionary Movement.

== Life ==
On September 12, 1845, Joshua Levering was born in Baltimore, Maryland to Eugene Levering and Ann S. Levering along with his identical twin brother Eugene Levering. In 1872, he married Martha W. Keyser and had seven children with her before her death in 1888 and later married her sister Margaret S. Keyser in 1892 until her death in 1895. In 1901, he married Helen Woods who would outlive him. From 1881 to 1903, he was the superintendent of the Sunday school of Eutaw Place Church.

In 1867, Levering served as a delegate to the Southern Baptist Convention. Prior to 1884, he was a member of the Democratic Party. In 1884, he joined the Prohibition Party and was the party's candidate for comptroller in 1891 and governor in 1895. In 1887 and in 1893, he was chairman of the Maryland Prohibition party's state convention and served as a delegate to the 1888 and 1892 national conventions.

At the 1892 Prohibition National Convention, he was narrowly defeated by James B. Cranfill for the Prohibition Party's vice presidential nomination with 416 delegates to 332 delegates after a story circulated that Levering was a member of the coffee industry. At the 1896 Prohibition National Convention, Levering became the presidential candidate of the party for the presidential election. Levering was a narrow gauger who supported a platform with one plank for prohibition unlike the broad gaugers who supported free silver and women's suffrage being added to the platform. He and his running mate Hale Johnson received 131,312 votes while the broad gauger presidential ticket of Charles Eugene Bentley and James H. Southgate received 13,968 votes.

In 1885, he was elected as the president of the local branch of the YMCA until his retirement on January 8, 1901. In 1903, 1904, 1906, and 1907, he and members of his family traveled throughout the world to observe missionaries in Japan and China. In 1925 he served as a delegate to the Southern Baptist Convention again. On October 6, 1935 he died in Baltimore at age 90.

== See also ==
- List of Southern Baptist Convention affiliated people
- Southern Baptist Convention
- Southern Baptist Convention Presidents
- Temperance organizations

Party political offices
| Preceded by John Bidwell | Prohibition nominee for President of the United States; 1896; Served alongside: Charles Eugene Bentley | Succeeded by John G. Woolley |
Religious titles
| Preceded by E. W. Stephens | President of the Southern Baptist Convention; 1908–1910 | Succeeded by Edwin Dargan |
