= 1896 Prohibition National Convention =

American political convention

- 1896 presidential election
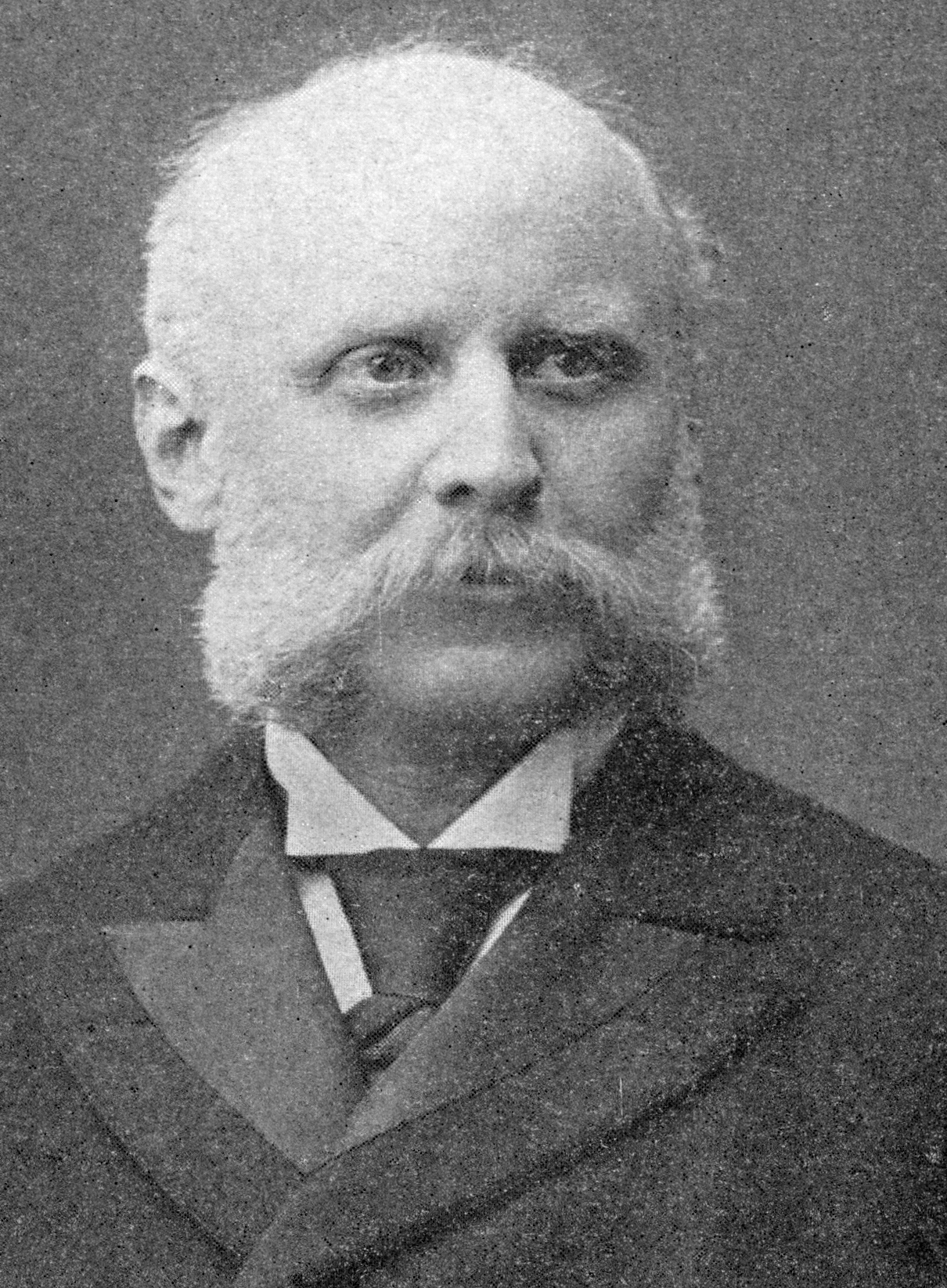
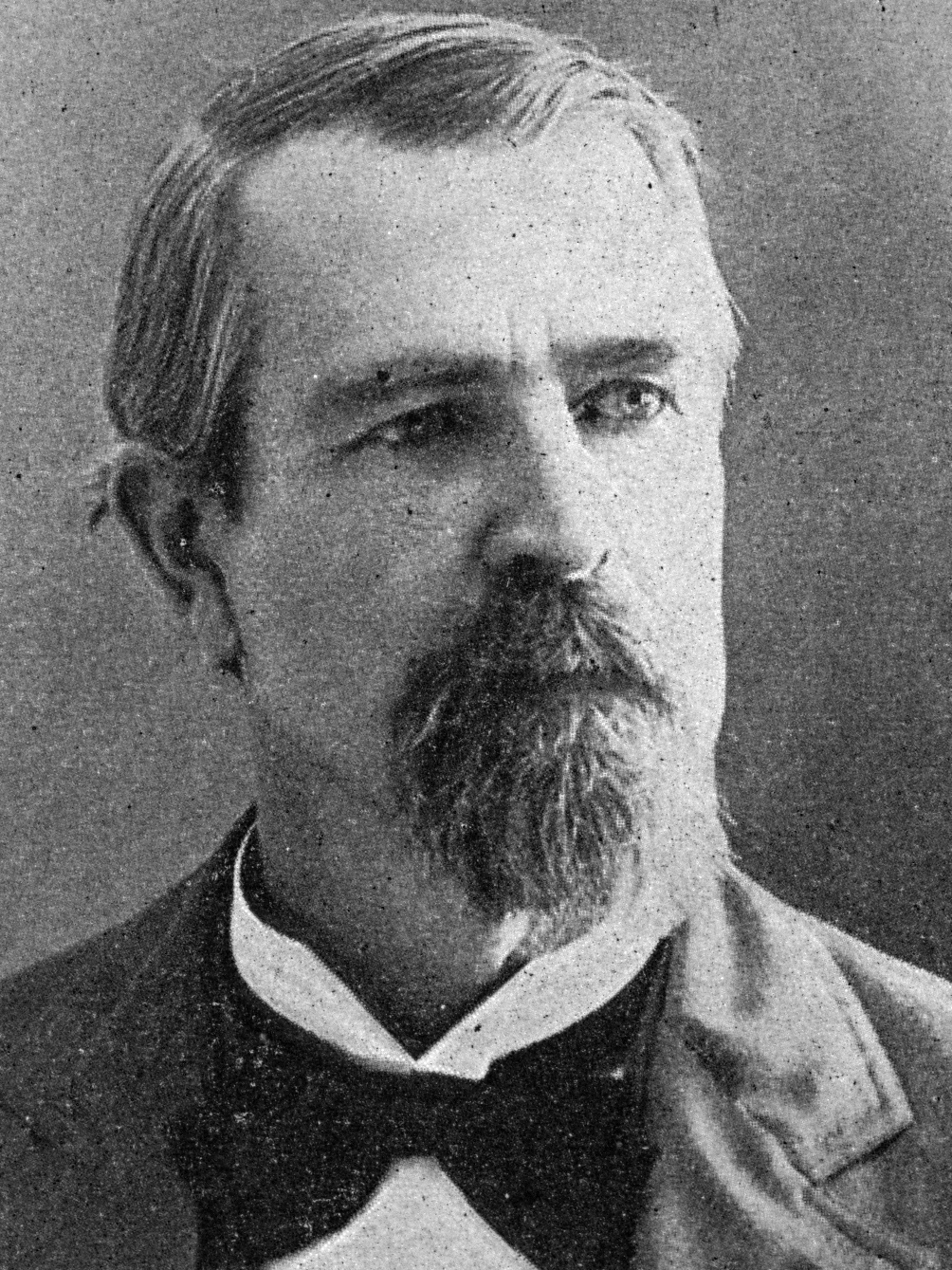
- Nominees (Levering & Johnson)

Convention
- Date(s): May 27–28, 1896
- City: Pittsburgh, Pennsylvania
- Venue: Exposition Hall

Candidates
- Presidential nominee: Joshua Levering of Maryland
- Vice-presidential nominee: Hale Johnson of Illinois

The 1896 Prohibition National Convention was held May 27–28, 1896, at Exposition Hall in Pittsburgh, Pennsylvania. It nominated Joshua Levering for president and Hale Johnson for vice president.

== Logistics ==
The convention was held at Exposition Hall in Pittsburgh, Pennsylvania, on May 27 and May 28 1896. The convention was held before other parties' national conventions, which were held in July.

== Convention business ==
The Prohibition Party went into its convention divided into two factions, each unwilling to give ground or compromise with the other. The "Broad-Gauge" wing, led by Charles Bentley and former Kansas Governor John St. John, demanded the inclusion of planks endorsing the free coinage of silver at 16:1 and of women's suffrage, the former refusing to accept the nomination if such amendments to the party platform were not approved. The "Narrow-Gauge" wing, led by Samuel Dickie of Michigan and rallying around the candidacy of Joshua Levering, demanded that the party platform remain dedicated exclusively to the prohibition of alcohol.

=== Chairman election ===
Conflict between the two sides soon broke out over the nomination of a permanent chairman, with a number of presented candidates for the position withdrawing before Oliver Stewart of Illinois, a "Broad-Gauger", was nominated.

=== Platform ===
A minority report by St. John supported the free coinage of silver, government control of railroads and telegraphs, an income tax and referendums, and was prevented from being tabled, giving "Broad-Gaugers" confidence, but a number of those who voted for the report were merely undecided or against gagging the report. After a majority of 188 brought the report forward, "Narrow-Gaugers" campaigned among wavering delegates of the Northeast and Midwest to convince them of the electoral consequences should it be adopted: that Party gains in states like New York would reverse overnight in the face of free coinage and populism. When St. John's report was brought up to a formal vote the margins had largely reversed; it was rejected, 492 to 310. With the silver delegates still in shock and St. John attempting to move for a reconsideration, Illinois "Narrow-Gaugers" moved to offer as a substitute to both the minority and majority reports a single-plank platform centered on Prohibition. A rising vote was taken in lieu of a roll call, with the "Narrow-Gauge" Platform winning the vote and being adopted.

In an attempt to mollify suffragists who were incensed at the lack of a plank endorsing women's suffrage, the plank itself was adopted through a resolution by the convention by a near unanimous vote.

=== Presidential and vice presidential nominations ===
When it came to the nomination for president, many "Broad-Gaugers" were already openly considering bolting and running their own candidate as it became increasingly apparent that the "Narrow-Gaugers" had brought a majority of the convention under their influence. Formal action was deferred until after the nomination for president was made. With Charles Bentley refusing to be nominated under the single-plank platform, an attempt was made to nominate the recently retired governor of the Arizona Territory, Louis Hughes, but as it became apparent that Levering was set to receive the support of most of the delegates, they opted to withdraw Hughes's name. Once Levering's nomination was confirmed without any visible opposition, around 200 of those who were suffragists, silverites or populists bolted the convention, led by Bentley and St. John, and joined with the National Reform "Party" to create the National Party. Afterward, the convention unanimously nominated Hale Johnson of Illinois for vice president.

== Splinter convention ==
After the leaving the convention, bolting "Broad-Guagers" formed a splinter convention in another convention hall in Pittsburgh. Among the more prominent party members who bolted to the splinter convention were St. John; R. S. Thompson of Ohio (editor of the New Era); Helen M. Gougar of Indiana; John Lloyd Thomas of New York; L. B. Logan of Ohio. The walkout was led by both St. John and Charles E. Bentley. St. John exclaimed that the regular convention had been "...bought up by Wall Street."

The bolting "Broad Gaugers" joined forces with the "National Reform Party", which had begun its own convention in Pittsburgh the day prior to the Prohibition Convention. The National Reform Party's convention had started as a gathering of only approximately eight delegates. It aimed to attract members of any potential bolt from the Prohibition Party, and initially hoped to nominate Representative Joseph C. Sibley for president. After the bolt, the bolting delegates and the members of the National Reform Party reorganized as the "National Party". Their convention quickly nominated Charles Eugene Bentley of Nebraska for the presidency, with James H. Southgate of North Carolina, the state chairman of the North Carolina Prohibition Party, as his running mate.

For its platform, the delegates for the new National Party approved the minority report that had been rejected at the Prohibitionist Convention calling for free coinage and greenbacks, government control of railroads and telegraphs, direct election of senators and the president, and an income tax among others.
