= James B. Cranfill =

American politician

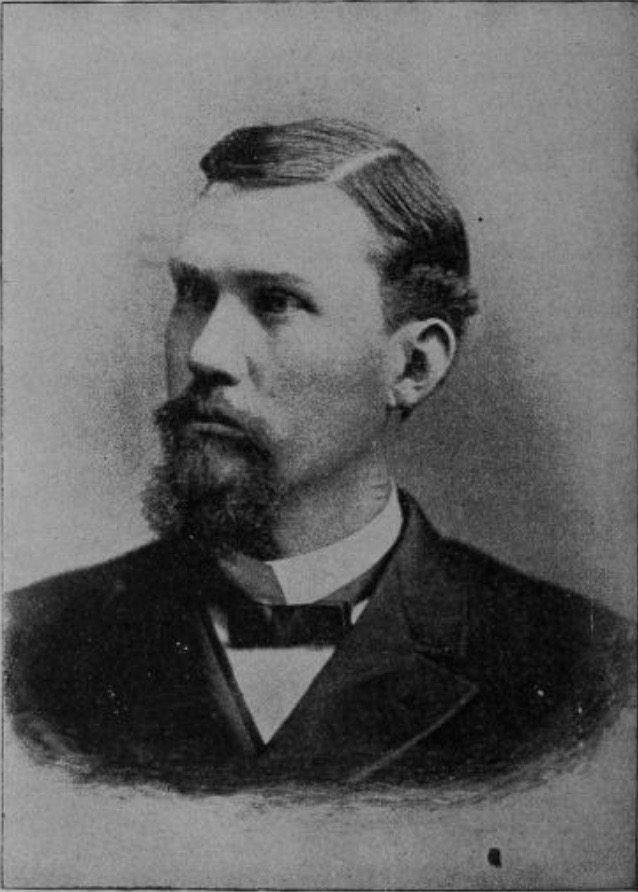

Personal details
- Born: James Britton Cranfill; September 12, 1858 Whitt, Texas, U.S.
- Died: December 28, 1942 (aged 84) Dallas, Texas, U.S.
- Party: Prohibition
- Spouse: Ollie Allen
- Parents: Eaton Cranfill (father); Martha Galloway (mother)

James Britton Cranfill (September 12, 1858 – December 28, 1942) was an American religious figure and prohibitionist who served as the Prohibition Party's vice presidential nominee in 1892.

== Life ==
James Britton Cranfill was born in Whitt, Texas on September 12, 1858, to Eaton Cranfill and Martha Galloway. He began to study medicine under his father in 1870 and received his medical certificate at age 21 in 1879. In 1890, he was ordained as a Baptist pastor and in 1892 he founded the Baptist Standard which he also served as editor of.

On July 1, 1892, he narrowly defeated Joshua Levering for the Prohibition Party's vice presidential nomination with 416 delegates to 332 delegates after a story circulated that Levering was a member of the coffee industry. Cranfill was nominated despite the fact that, at 33, he was below the minimum constitutional age of 35 to serve as vice president. General John Bidwell was given the presidential nomination and the ticket received 270,813 votes for 2.24% of the popular vote which is the best performance of any Prohibition presidential ticket. At the Prohibition Party's 1896 convention he was elected as chairman of the resolutions committee to create the party's platform and supported the narrow gauger faction of the party and presidential nominee Joshua Levering. In 1908 he ran for the Prohibition Party's presidential nomination, but only received 28 delegates compared to Eugene Chafin's 636 delegates.

On December 28, 1942, he died in Dallas, Texas at age 84 after suffering a stroke on December 24.

Party political offices
Preceded by John A. Brooks	Prohibition nominee for Vice President of the United States; 1892	Succeeded by Hale Johnson; James H. Southgate
