= Socrates (disambiguation) =

Socrates was an Athenian philosopher.

Socrates, Sócrates, Sokrates or Sokratis may also refer to:

== People ==
=== Given name ===
==== Ancient Greeks ====
- Socrates of Achaea (c. 436–401 BC), mercenary general of the Ten Thousand
- Socrates of Macedon (4th century BC), a hipparchos or cavalry officer in Alexander the Great's army
- Socrates the Younger (4th century BC), Athenian philosopher
- Socrates Chrestus (died 90–88 BC), Greek prince and King of Bithynia

==== Athletes ====
- Sócrates (1954–2011), Brazilian footballer
- Socrates Brito (born 1992), Dominican baseball player
- Sócrates Parri (born 1966), Spanish footballer
- Sócrates Pedro (born 1992), Portuguese footballer
- Sócrates Quintana (1891–1984), Spanish footballer and artist
- Sokratis Aristodimou (born 1970), Cypriot alpine skier
- Sokratis Boudouris (born 1977), Greek footballer
- Sokratis Dioudis (born 1993), Greek football goalkeeper
- Sokratis Fytanidis (born 1984), Greek footballer
- Sokratis Kyrillidis (born 1998), Greek footballer
- Sokratis Lagoudakis (1861–1944), Greek track athlete
- Sokratis Naoumis (born 1997), Greek basketball player
- Sokratis Ofrydopoulos (born 1973), Greek football manager and former player
- Sokratis Papastathopoulos (born 1988), Greek footballer
- Sokratis Petrou (born 1979), Greek footballer
- Sokratis Psaropoulos (born 1992), Greek basketball player
- Sokratis Tsoukalas (born 1992), Greek footballer

==== Politicians, soldiers and businesspeople ====
- Socrates N. Sherman (1801–1873), U.S. Representative from New York and American Civil War officer
- Socrates Nelson (1814–1867), American businessman and politician
- Sócrates Rizzo (born 1945), Mexican politician
- Socrates Tuttle (1819–1885), American politician from New Jersey
- Sokrates Starynkiewicz (1820–1902), Russian general and mayor of Warsaw
- Sokratis Kokkalis (born 1939), Greek businessman and billionaire
- Sokratis Kosmidis (born 1945), Greek lawyer and politician
- Sokratis Xynidis (born 1963), Greek politician

==== Religious figures ====
- martyrs Socrates and Stephen
- Socrates of Constantinople (c. 380–after 439), also known as Socrates Scholasticus, a Byzantine church historian
- Socrates Villegas (born 1960), Roman Catholic archbishop in the Philippines

==== Writers ====
- Socrates K. Valath (born 1963), Indian novelist and short story writer
- Sócrates Nolasco (1884–1980), writer from the Dominican Republic
- Sokratis Giolias (1973–2010), assassinated Greek journalist
- Sokratis Skartsis (1936–2024), Greek poet and writer

==== Other ====
- Socrates Hotchkiss Tryon, Sr. (1816–1855), American pioneer physician in the Oregon Territory
- Socrates Tzartos, Greek biologist and neuro-immunologist
- Sokrates Pantelides (born 1948), Greek American physicist and electrical engineer
- Sokratis Karantinos (1906–1979), Greek theatre director, theatre critic, drama school teacher and actor
- Sokratis Malamas (born 1957), Greek singer/songwriter

=== Surname ===
- Jeanne Socrates (born 1942), British yachtswoman and solo circumnavigator
- José Sócrates (born 1957), Prime Minister of Portugal (2005–2011)

== In literature ==
- Socrates, the name used by Petrarch to refer to his dear friend Lodewijk Heyligen in his writings
- Socrates, a pseudonym for the mentor-like figure in the books of Dan Millman
- Socrates, the protagonist of many Socratic dialogues

== Arts and entertainment ==
- Socrates "Cooch" Windgrass, a character in the comic strip Footrot Flats
- Socrates Drank the Conium (sometimes abbreviated to "Socrates"), a Greek rock band
- Socrates (sculpture), a 1950 outdoor sculpture by W. V. Casey
- Socrates (Voltaire), a play

=== Film and TV ===
- Socrates (1970 film), a film directed by Roberto Rossellini
- Socrates (2018 film), a film directed by Alexandre Moratto
- Socrates the Scarecrow, a character from the 1961 animated television series Tales of the Wizard of Oz and the 1964 animated television movie sequel Return to Oz
- Socrates, the lion from the film Animals United
- Socrates, the rat from the film Willard

== Other uses ==
- Project Socrates, a classified US Defense Intelligence Agency program established in 1983
- Socrates II, a chess-playing computer program
- Socrates Mountain, a mountain in West Virginia
- Socrates (pain assessment), a mnemonic used in the evaluation of a patient's pain
- Socrates programme, a European education programme
- SOCRATES (satellite), a Japanese satellite
- Socrates Sculpture Park, New York City
- Socrates, Georgia, a community in the United States
- VTech Socrates, an educational video game system

== See also ==
- Saukrates (born 1978), Canadian rapper
- Socrate, a symphonic drama about the philosopher Socrates by Erik Satie
- "Sokrati", the Greek entry in the Eurovision Song Contest 1979
