= Kosmidis =

Kosmidis is a surname. Notable people with the surname include:

- Gabbi Kosmidis
- Georgios Kosmidis
- Eleftherios Kosmidis
- Sokratis Kosmidis
