= Jennie Tuttle Hobart =

Second Lady of the United States (1849–1941)

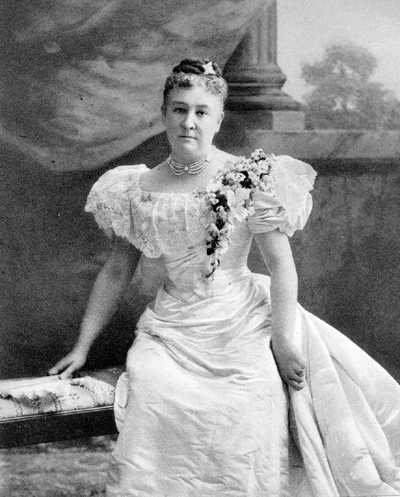

Second Lady of the United States
- In role March 4, 1897 – November 21, 1899
- Vice President: Garret Hobart
- Preceded by: Letitia Stevenson
- Succeeded by: Edith Roosevelt

Personal details
- Born: Esther Jane Tuttle; April 30, 1849 Paterson, New Jersey, U.S.
- Died: January 8, 1941 (aged 91) Haledon, New Jersey, U.S.
- Resting place: Cedar Lawn Cemetery
- Spouse: Garret Hobart (m. 1869; died 1899)
- Children: 4
- Parent(s): Socrates Tuttle; Jane (Winters) Tuttle
- Relatives: George S. Hobart (nephew-in-law)

Esther Jane "Jennie" Hobart (née Tuttle; April 30, 1849 – January 8, 1941) was the wife of Vice President Garret Hobart. She served as the second lady of the United States from 1897 until her husband's death in 1899, and was a philanthropist and community activist in New Jersey.

Hobart often served as White House hostess because the first lady, Ida Saxton McKinley, suffered from epilepsy and other chronic ailments.

== Biography ==
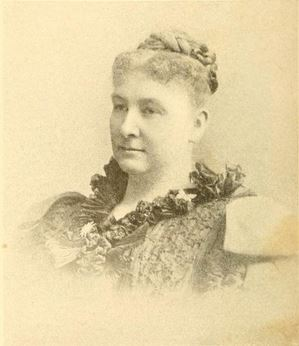
Portrait of Hobart

Born and raised in Paterson, New Jersey, Hobart was the daughter of the prominent attorney Socrates Tuttle and his wife, Jane Winters. Her mother died soon after birth, leaving Hobart to be raised by her step-mother, Elizabeth Willer Tuttle. She married Garret Hobart in Paterson on July 21, 1869, at the start of his career as a lawyer and politician. They had four children, two of whom died in childhood. The other two were Garret Jr. and Fannie, who died in 1895.

In 1896, Garret Hobart was elected Vice President of the United States and the family moved to Washington, D.C. As the second lady of the United States, Hobart often served as White House hostess because the first lady, Ida Saxton McKinley, suffered from epilepsy and other chronic ailments. Vice President Hobart died of heart failure on November 21, 1899. After his death, she returned to Paterson and became involved in community affairs. She was a close friend of Mrs. McKinley and rushed to Buffalo, New York, to offer her support when President McKinley was assassinated in September 1901.

During the American women's suffrage movement, Hobart positioned herself as definitively anti-suffrage. She organized the New Jersey Association Opposed to Woman Suffrage and held regular meetings.

Hobart died of pneumonia on January 8, 1941, aged 91, in Haledon, New Jersey, where she had been living on her son's farm, and was buried in Cedar Lawn Cemetery in Paterson, New Jersey.

== The McKinley Administration ==
When the McKinley family moved into the White House after President McKinley's inauguration, the Hobart family leased a mansion across the square that came to be known as the "Little Cream White House," formally the Benjamin Ogle Tayloe House. Hobart would daily visit, and often stand in for, Ida McKinley with whom she shared a close friendship. Mrs. McKinley's poor health during the first two years of McKinley's administration led to Hobart taking over many duties typically reserved for the First Lady. President McKinley would use a pre-arranged signal of holding a newspaper before Hobart when Mrs. McKinley was about to faint, alerting her to take over the entertainment of guests.

Honorary titles
Preceded by Letitia Stevenson	Second Lady of the United States; 1897–1899	Vacant Title next held by Edith Roosevelt
