= Garret Hobart =

Vice President of the United States from 1897 to 1899

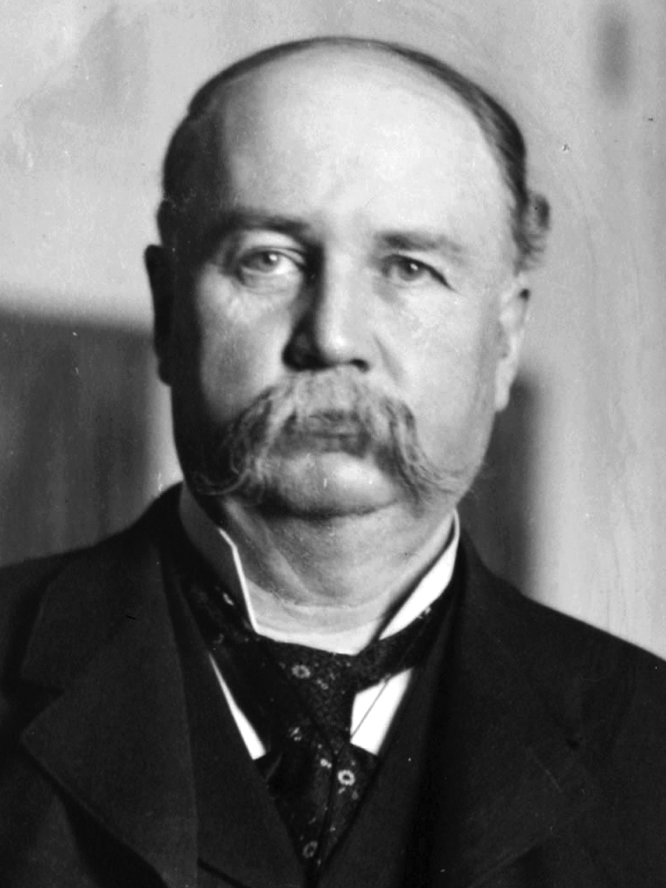
- Hobart, c. 1897

24th Vice President of the United States
- In office March 4, 1897 – November 21, 1899
- President: William McKinley
- Preceded by: Adlai Stevenson
- Succeeded by: Theodore Roosevelt

President of the New Jersey Senate
- In office January 11, 1881 – January 9, 1883
- Preceded by: William Joyce Sewell
- Succeeded by: John J. Gardner

Member of the New Jersey Senate from Passaic County
- In office January 9, 1877 – January 9, 1883
- Preceded by: John Hopper
- Succeeded by: John W. Griggs

Speaker of the New Jersey General Assembly
- In office January 13, 1874 – January 12, 1875
- Preceded by: Isaac L. Fisher
- Succeeded by: George O. Vanderbilt

Member of the New Jersey General Assembly from Passaic's 3rd district
- In office January 14, 1873 – January 12, 1875
- Preceded by: Robert M. Torbet
- Succeeded by: Robert M. Torbet

Personal details
- Born: Garret Augustus Hobart; June 3, 1844 Long Branch, New Jersey, U.S.
- Died: November 21, 1899 (aged 55) Paterson, New Jersey, U.S.
- Resting place: Cedar Lawn Cemetery, Paterson, New Jersey, U.S.
- Party: Republican
- Spouse: Jennie Tuttle (m. 1869)
- Children: 4
- Relatives: George S. Hobart (nephew)
- Education: Rutgers College (BA)
- Profession: Politician; Attorney

Garret Augustus Hobart (June 3, 1844 – November 21, 1899) was the 24th vice president of the United States, serving from 1897 until his death in 1899, under President William McKinley. A member of the Republican Party, Hobart was an influential New Jersey businessman and political operative prior to his vice presidency.

Hobart was born in Long Branch, New Jersey, on the Jersey Shore, and grew up in nearby Marlboro. He attended Rutgers College in New Brunswick, and read law under Paterson-based attorney Socrates Tuttle. He both studied with Tuttle and married his daughter, Jennie. Although he rarely set foot in a courtroom, Hobart became wealthy as a corporate lawyer. Hobart served in local governmental positions, and then successfully ran for office as a Republican, serving in both the New Jersey General Assembly, where he was elected Speaker in 1874, and the New Jersey Senate, where he became its president in 1881.

He was a longtime state and national party official; during the 1896 Republican National Convention, New Jersey delegates to the convention were determined to nominate him for vice president. Hobart's political views were similar to those of William McKinley, the presumptive Republican presidential candidate. With New Jersey a key state in the upcoming election, McKinley and his close advisor, future U.S. Senator Mark Hanna, backed Hobart, who was easily nominated on the first ballot. The vice presidential candidate emulated his running mate with a front porch campaign, and also spent considerable time at the campaign's New York City headquarters. On November 3, 1896, McKinley and Hobart were elected.

As vice president, Hobart proved a popular figure in Washington and was a close advisor to McKinley. Hobart's tact and humor were valuable to the President, as in mid-1899 when Secretary of War Russell Alger failed to understand that McKinley wanted him to leave office. Hobart invited Alger to his New Jersey summer home and broke the news to the secretary, who submitted his resignation to McKinley on his return to Washington. Hobart died of heart disease in 1899, aged 55, causing the office of the Vice President to be vacant for the remainder of McKinley's first term as, until the passage of the 25th Amendment in 1967, there was no constitutional provision to fill a vacancy in the vice presidency. His place on the Republican ticket in 1900 was taken by Theodore Roosevelt, who succeeded as president after McKinley's assassination in 1901.

== Early life and education ==
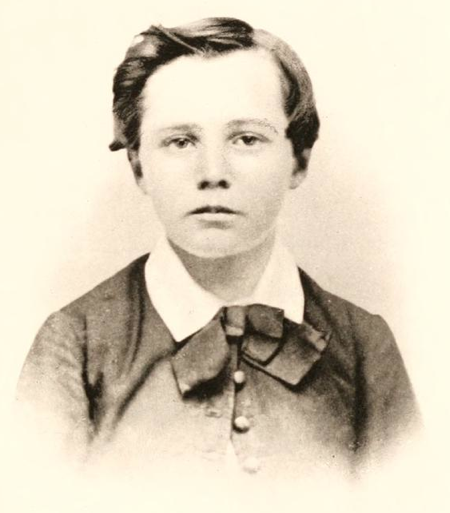
Hobart as a young boy, c. 1858

Garret Augustus Hobart was born on June 3, 1844, in Long Branch, New Jersey, to Addison Willard Hobart and Sophia Hobart (née Vanderveer). Addison Hobart descended from the early colonial-era settlers of New England; many Hobarts served as pastors. Addison Hobart came to New Jersey, where he taught school in Bradevelt, a small hamlet in Marlboro Township, New Jersey. His mother was descended from 17th-century Dutch settlers of New Amsterdam in present-day New York City, who later moved to Long Island and then ultimately to New Jersey. When Addison and Sophia Hobart married in 1841, they moved to Long Branch, where Addison founded an elementary school. The couple had three children who survived infancy; Garret was the second of three boys.

Hobart initially attended his father's school in Long Branch. The family moved to Marlboro in the early 1850s, where he attended the village school. Childhood tales of the future vice president describe him as an excellent student in both day and Sunday school, and a leader in boyhood sports. Recognizing his abilities, his father sent him to a well-regarded school in Freehold. After a disagreement with the teacher, however, he refused to return. He then attended Middletown Point Academy, later known as the Glenwood Institute, a boarding school in Matawan, New Jersey. Hobart graduated at age 15. His parents felt he was too young to attend college, so he remained at home for a year, where he studied and worked part-time at the Bradevelt School, the same institution that employed his father.

In 1860, Hobart enrolled at Rutgers College. In 1863, he graduated third in his class. Throughout his adult life, Hobart was a generous donor to Rutgers, and was awarded an honorary degree after becoming vice president, and was elected a Rutgers trustee shortly before his death.

== Career ==
=== Law practice ===
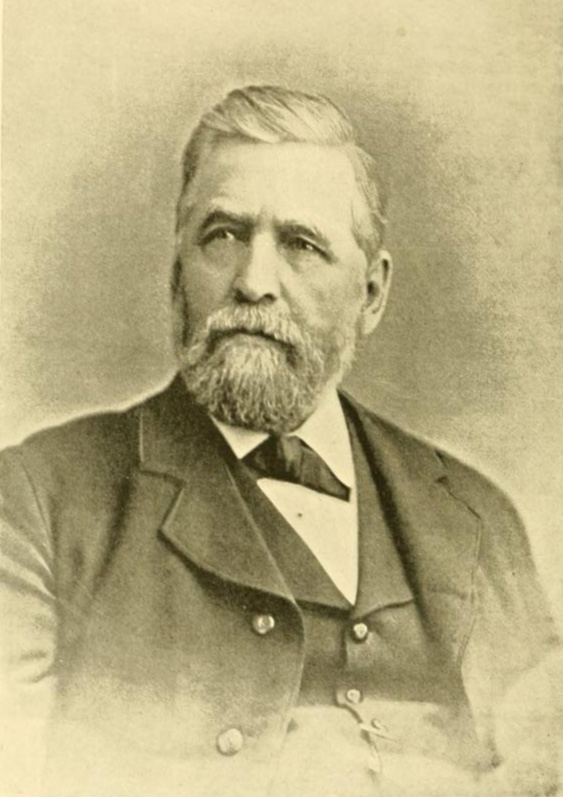
Paterson-based lawyer Socrates Tuttle taught Hobart the law and helped advance his political career; in 1869, Hobart married Tuttle's daughter Jennie

After graduating from Rutgers, Hobart worked briefly as a teacher to repay loans. Although Hobart was young and in good health, he did not serve in the Union Army. Addison Hobart's childhood friend, lawyer Socrates Tuttle, offered to take Hobart into his office to study law. Tuttle was a prominent Passaic County lawyer who had served in the New Jersey state legislature. Hobart supported himself by working as a bank clerk in Paterson; he later became director of the same bank. Hobart was admitted to the bar in 1866; he became a counsellor-at-law in 1871 and a master in chancery in 1872.

In addition to learning law from Tuttle, Hobart fell in love with his daughter, Jennie Tuttle Hobart, who later recalled, "When this attractive young law student appeared in our home I, then a young girl in my teens, unexpectedly played a rôle of importance by losing my heart to him". They were married on July 21, 1869. The Hobarts had long been Democrats; Garret Hobart's marriage into the Republican Tuttle family converted him. The Hobarts had four children, two of whom survived infancy. One daughter, Fannie, died in 1895; Hobart's son, Garret Jr. survived him.

Socrates Tuttle was influential in Paterson, which worked to Hobart's advantage. According to historian Michael J. Connolly, the future vice president "benefited greatly from Tuttle's beneficence". In 1866, the year he became a lawyer, Hobart was appointed grand jury clerk for Passaic County, New Jersey. When Tuttle became mayor of Paterson in 1871, he appointed Hobart as city counsel. A year later, Hobart became counsel for the county Board of Chosen Freeholders.

=== Political career ===
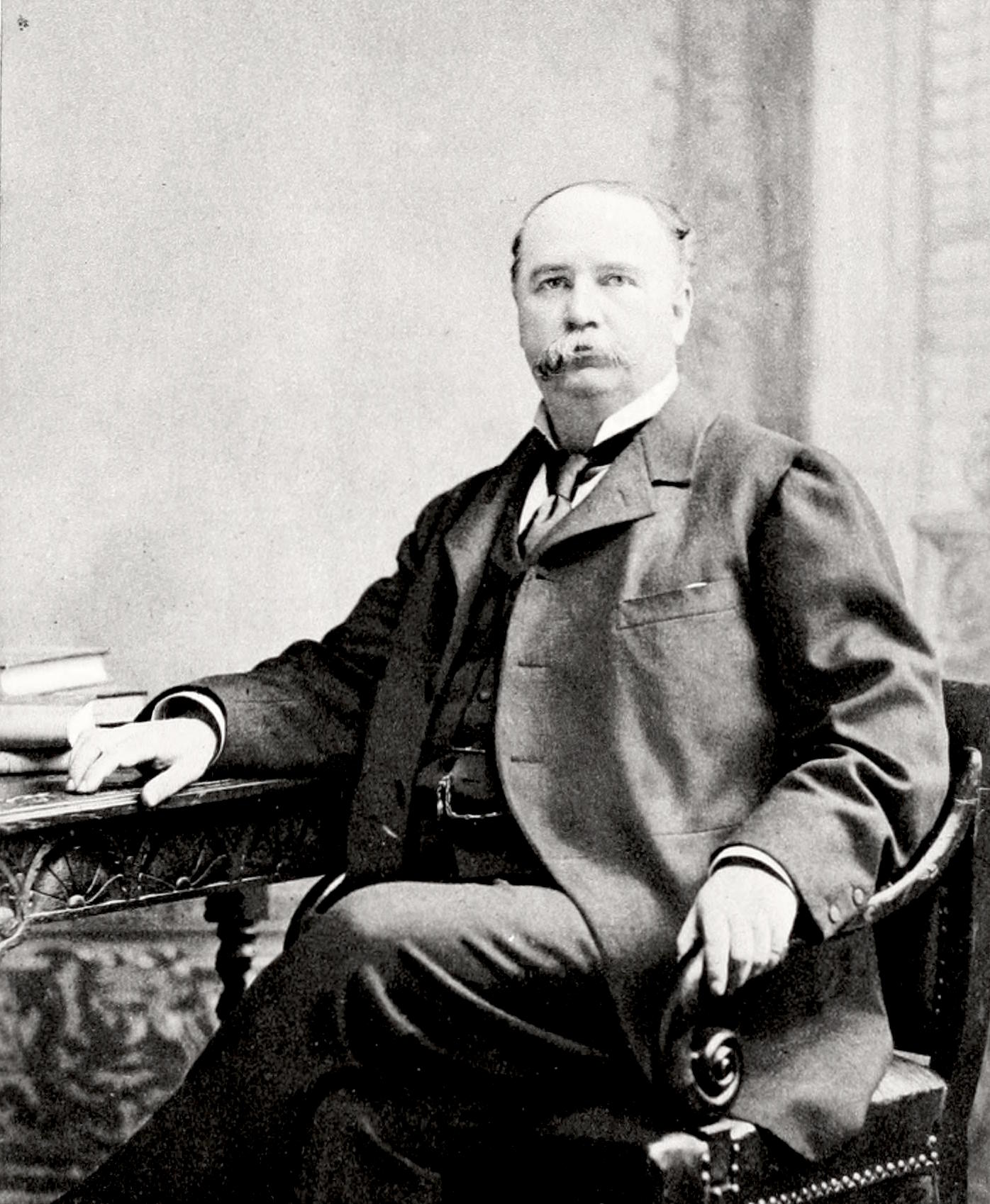
Hobart at his desk, date unknown

In 1872, Hobart ran as a Republican for the New Jersey General Assembly from Passaic County's third legislative district. He was easily elected, winning nearly two-thirds of the vote. At the time, members of the General Assembly were elected annually, and Hobart was successful in winning re-election the following year, although his margin of victory was cut in half.

In 1874, still only age 30, he was voted Speaker of the Assembly. In 1876, he was nominated for the New Jersey Senate seat for Passaic County. He was elected to a three-year term and he was re-elected in 1879. In 1881 and 1882, he served as President of the state Senate, becoming the first man to lead both houses of the legislature. In 1883, he was the Republican nominee in the election for United States Senate—until the passage of 17th amendment in 1913, senators were elected by state legislatures. As the Democrats were in the majority, the nomination was a way of honoring Hobart for his political service. When he was asked his feelings about the nomination, he responded, "I do not worry about things that do not come my way." The complimentary nomination would prove to be Hobart's only electoral defeat.

Hobart said of his involvement in public affairs, "I make politics my recreation." He devoted most of his time to a law practice which according to Hobart's legislative biography was highly profitable. He was rarely seen in a courtroom; his official biography for the 1896 campaign acknowledged that "he has actually appeared in court a smaller number of times than, perhaps, any lawyer in Passaic County". Hobart's real work was in advising corporations how to accomplish their aims, yet remain within the law. He also had a lucrative business acting as court-appointed receiver of bankrupt railroads, reorganizing them and restoring them to fiscal health. He often invested heavily in them; Hobart's success made him wealthy. In addition to the railroads for which he served as a receiver, he served as president of the Paterson Railway Company, which ran the city's streetcars, and as a board member for other railroads. According to historian Lewis L. Gould, Hobart sat on the boards of or held offices in sixty corporations.

One reason for Hobart's success in both the private and public sectors was his genial personality. He worked well with others and was noted for tact and charm. Senator Mark Hatfield, in his book on American vice presidents, suggests that these qualities would have made Hobart successful in Washington, D.C. had he run for Congress. Hatfield states that the reason why Hobart chose not to move from state to national politics prior to 1896 was a reluctance to leave a comfortable life and successful law practice in Paterson. Instead, Hobart continued to involve himself in party politics; he was widely regarded as Northern New Jersey's most influential Republican.

Beginning in 1876, he was a delegate to every Republican National Convention in his lifetime. He was chairman of the New Jersey Republican Committee from 1880 to 1891, resigning the position as he became more deeply involved in Republican National Committee affairs. He was New Jersey's representative on the national committee after 1884, and rose to become vice chairman.

== Election of 1896 ==
=== Selection as candidate ===
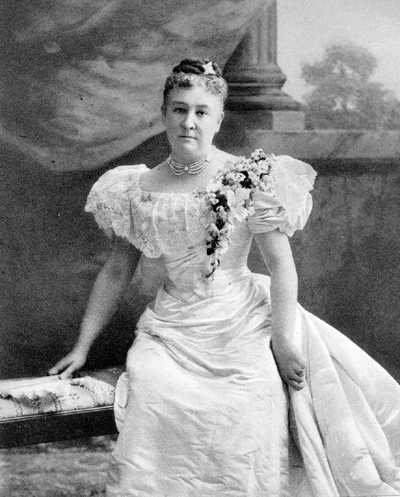
Hobart's wife Jennie

A McKinley-Hobart campaign poster during the 1896 campaign

Jennie Tuttle Hobart, in her memoirs, traced her suspicions that her husband might be a vice presidential contender to a lunch she had with him at the Waldorf Hotel in New York City, in March 1895. During the meal, industrialist and future U.S. Senator Mark Hanna interrupted them to ask what Garret Hobart thought of the possible presidential candidacy of Ohio governor William McKinley. Hanna was one of McKinley's principal backers. Garret Hobart evaded the question, but Jennie Hobart believed the conversation to have been the first of a chain of events which elevated her husband to national office.

In November 1895, Republican John Griggs was elected governor of New Jersey; his campaign was managed by Hobart. The election of New Jersey's first Republican governor since the 1860s led to speculation in the newspapers that Hobart would be a candidate for vice president. New Jersey Republicans were anxious to nominate Hobart, both to see one of their own possibly elevated to national office, and in the hope that having Hobart on the national ticket would boost the Republican vote in New Jersey. Hobart was an attractive candidate as he was from a swing state, and the Griggs victory showed that Republicans could hope to win New Jersey's electoral votes, which they had not done since 1872. Another reason for a Hobart selection was his wealth; he could be expected to spend abundantly on his own campaign.

According to Hanna biographer Herbert Croly, Hobart, an early supporter of McKinley, helped ensure New Jersey's support for him at the Republican convention. Historian Stanley Jones, in his study of the 1896 election, stated that Hobart stopped off in Canton, Ohio, McKinley's hometown, en route to the convention in St. Louis. Jones wrote that the future vice president was selected several days in advance, after Speaker of the House Thomas Reed of Maine turned down the nomination. Croly asserted that McKinley and Hanna desired an easterner on the ticket to balance it and boost support in the Mid-Atlantic region. The conventional means of assuring this was to nominate a politician from New York, then the largest state in population. As many New York delegates supported their favorite son candidate, Governor (and former vice president) Levi P. Morton, instead of McKinley, giving the state the vice-presidential nomination would be an unmerited reward. According to Croly,

On the other hand, the adjoining state of New Jersey submitted an eligible candidate in Mr. Garret A. Hobart, who had done much to strengthen the Republican party in his own neighborhood. Mr. Hobart was well known to Mr. Hanna, and in all probability, his nomination had been scheduled for some time. It was practically announced early in June. He was a lawyer and a businessman with an exclusively local reputation; and if he did little to strengthen the ticket he did nothing to weaken it.

Not for himself, but for our state; not for his ambition, but to give to the Nation the highest type of public official do we come to this convention, by the command of our state and in the name of the Republican Party of New Jersey—unconquered and unconquerable, undivided and indivisible—with our united voices speaking for all that counts for good citizenship in our state, and nominate to you for the office of Vice-President of the Republic, Garret A. Hobart of New Jersey.

— John Franklin Fort of New Jersey, June 18, 1896

McKinley was nominated for president on the first ballot. Hobart described his subsequent first-ballot nomination for vice president as a tribute from his friends, but Hatfield noted, "it came equally as a tribute from [Hanna, who] wanted a ticket to satisfy the business interests of America, and Hobart, a corporate lawyer, fit that requirement perfectly". Although a Hobart nomination had been talked about at least since Griggs's victory the previous November, Hobart expressed reluctance in a letter to his wife from the convention: "It looks to me I will be nominated for Vice-President whether I want it or not, and as I get nearer to the point where I may, I am dismayed at the thought ... If I want a nomination, everything is going my way. But when I realize all that it means in work, worry, and loss of home and bliss, I am overcome, so overcome I am simply miserable." Despite Hobart's expressed hesitation, he was welcomed home by a crowd of 15,000 at the Paterson Armory. City officials, feeling they had insufficient fireworks to properly honor Hobart, obtained more from New York City.

According to historian R. Hal Williams, the Republicans left St. Louis in June with "a popular, experienced [presidential] candidate, a respected vice-presidential nominee, and an attractive platform". Many Republicans were convinced the election would be fought over the issue of tariffs, and they anticipated an easy victory.

On June 30, 1896, Hobart journeyed by train to Canton, where he was met at the station by his running mate. McKinley drove Hobart to the Ohioan's home, where Hobart followed McKinley in speaking to a delegation which had arrived to greet the presidential candidate. Hobart only remained in Canton a few hours before returning east. According to Hobart's Presbyterian minister and biographer David Magie, Hobart made the trip "to pay his respects to the head of the ticket and to consult with him upon important matters". McKinley biographer Margaret Leech recorded that the two men were friends almost as soon as they met.

=== Campaign ===
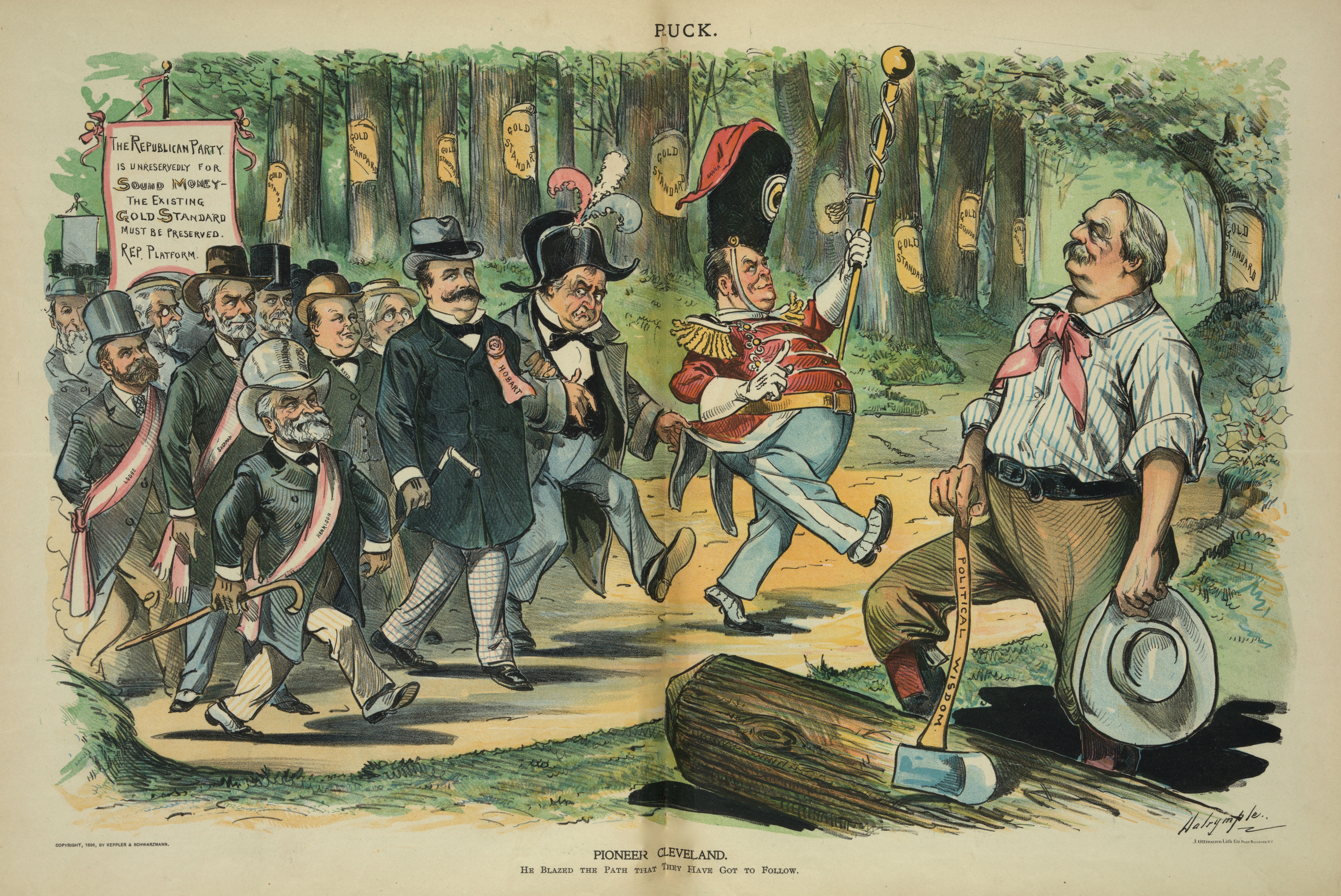
"Pioneer Cleveland", a Puck magazine cartoon showing Republicans following the path of the gold standard, which President Grover Cleveland (right) has blazed. Hobart (in a black coat just left of center) is wearing a campaign ribbon with his name on it, and walks between McKinley and former president Benjamin Harrison (with gray hat).

The Panic of 1893 had led to hard times in the United States, and the effects were still felt in 1896. One proposal to cure the economic malaise was "Free Silver"; that the government would accept silver bullion and return it to the depositor, struck into silver dollars. At the time, the silver in a dollar coin was worth $.53. Implementation of the proposals would increase the money supply and cause difficulties in international trade with nations that remained on the gold standard. Proponents argued that the increased money supply would stimulate the economy. President Grover Cleveland was firmly for the gold standard, a stance which bitterly divided the Democratic Party. Most Republicans were for the gold standard, though some, mostly from the West, were "Silver Republicans". The Democrats in early July nominated for president an eloquent silver supporter, former Nebraska congressman William Jennings Bryan, whose Cross of Gold speech at the convention catapulted him to the nomination. The selection of Bryan prompted a wave of popular support for the Democrats.

Hobart was a strong supporter of the gold standard; and insisted on it remaining a major part of the Republican campaign even in the face of Bryan's surge. In his speech responding to the formal notification of his convention victory, Hobart stated, "An honest dollar, worth 100 cents everywhere, cannot be coined out of 53 cents worth of silver plus a legislative fiat. Such a debasement of our currency would inevitably produce incalculable loss, appalling disaster, and National dishonor." McKinley was not as strong a supporter of the gold standard as Hobart and considered modifying some of Hobart's expressed views on the gold standard before the acceptance was printed for public distribution. Hobart insisted on it being printed without change, writing, "I think I know the sentiment of Eastern men better than you can, and with this knowledge and my convictions I must retain the statements as I have written them." According to Connolly, "Though a protectionist, Hobart believed the money issue, not tariffs, led to a November Republican victory, and, in denouncing silver, his rhetoric far outstripped [that of] William McKinley."

Together with Pennsylvania Senator Matthew Quay, Hobart ran the McKinley campaign's New York City office, often making the short journey from Paterson for strategy meetings. The vice-presidential candidate emulated McKinley in giving speeches from his front porch; unlike McKinley he also addressed rallies. In October, he made a short tour of New Jersey to campaign, expressing relief to his wife when it came to a close. On November 3, 1896, the voters cast their ballots in most states; a nervous Hobart spent the day at his office. Special telegraph wires had been attached to his home; at 8:30 in the evening, they conveyed the news to him that McKinley and Hobart had won. The Republican ticket won New Jersey, together with the entire Northeast. The following week, Vice President-elect Hobart attended the 130th-anniversary celebrations of Rutgers as guest of honor. The member of the Class of 1863 was now the college's most prominent graduate.

== Vice presidency (1897–1899) ==
Film of the 1897 inauguration with later audio commentary. Hobart appears, and is commented on briefly, beginning at the 0:38 mark.

Hobart spent much of the four months between election and inauguration reading about the vice presidency, preparing for the move, and winding down some business affairs. He did not, however, resign from the boards of corporations which would not have business before the federal government. "It would be highly ridiculous for me to resign from the different companies in which I am officer and a stockholder whose interests are not in the least affected, or likely to be, by my position as Vice President." On March 2, 1897, Hobart and his family left Paterson to travel to Washington by special train. On March 4, he was inaugurated as vice president in the Senate Chamber. The Chicago Daily News predicted, "Garret A. Hobart will not be seen or heard until, after four years, he emerges from the impenetrable vacuum of the Vice Presidency."

=== Presidential advisor ===
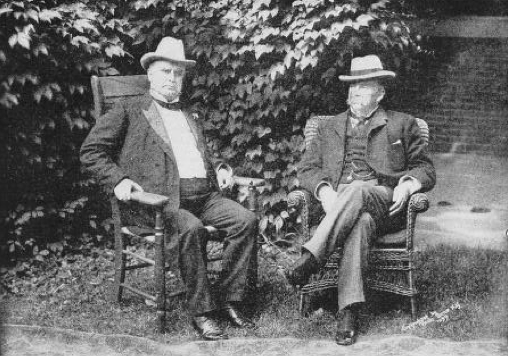
McKinley (left) and Hobart, photographed in Long Branch, New Jersey, during the summer of 1899

After moving to Washington, D.C., the Hobarts established themselves at the Arlington Hotel, which was the Washington, D.C. home to many political men of the era, including Hanna. Soon, however, Senator Don Cameron of Pennsylvania, who was retiring from office at the time of Hobart's inauguration, offered them the lease of the house he owned at 21 Madison Place, diagonally across Pennsylvania Avenue from the Executive Mansion, as the White House was then known. The asking price was $10,000 per year; the vice president bargained Cameron down to $8,000, equal to the vice-presidential salary, by suggesting that the public might assume he stole the excess. Among the frequent visitors at what came to be known as the "Cream White House" was Hanna, by then a senator, who would come by for breakfast and talk with the vice president until it was time for both to go to the Senate.

The president and vice president were already friends from the campaign; after the inauguration, a close relationship grew between the two men and their wives. The First Lady, Ida McKinley, had health issues, and could not stand the strain of the required official entertaining. Jennie Hobart often substituted for the first lady at receptions and other events, and also was a close companion, visiting her daily. The Hobarts and McKinleys visited each other's home without formality; according to Jennie Hobart, writing in 1930, "it was an intimate friendliness that no vice president and his wife, before or since, have had the privilege of sharing with their chief administrator." The Hobarts often entertained at their house, which was useful to McKinley, who could attend and meet informally with congressmen without placing strain on his wife with a White House function. McKinley, who had become insolvent while governor of Ohio, turned over a portion of his presidential salary to Hobart to invest.

The vice president had in recent administrations been considered a relatively low-level political functionary, whose activities were generally limited to the constitutional function of presiding over the Senate. Hobart, however, became a close advisor to McKinley and his Cabinet members, although he was not called upon to attend Cabinet meetings. Reporter Arthur Wallace Dunn wrote of Hobart in 1922, "for the first time in my recollection, and the last for that matter, the Vice President was recognized as somebody, as a part of the Administration, and as a part of the body over which he presided".

Through late 1897 and early 1898, many Americans called for the United States to intervene in Cuba, then a Spanish colony revolting against the mother country. These calls greatly increased in February 1898, when the American battleship Maine sank in Havana harbor after an explosion. McKinley sought delay, hoping to settle the disputes peacefully, but in April 1898, Hobart told the President that the Senate would act against Spain whether McKinley liked it or not. McKinley gave in; Congress declared war on April 25, beginning the Spanish–American War, and Hobart sent McKinley a pen with which to sign the declaration.

=== "Assistant President" ===
Hobart was more assertive as U.S. Senate president than his predecessors had been. It was customary for the vice president not to rule on disputed points, but to submit them to a vote. Hobart, with his experience as a presiding officer in the New Jersey Legislature, took a more assertive role, ruling on disputes, and trying to expedite legislation. Hobart was initially diffident in his role, feeling himself unproven beside longtime national legislators, but soon gained self-confidence, writing in a letter that "I find that I am as good and as capable as any of them. If they know a whole lot of things I don't know, I also know a whole lot of things they don't know. And there is a common humanity running through them all that makes us all as one, after all." Hobart was so successful at guiding the administration's legislative agenda through the Senate that he became known as the "assistant President".

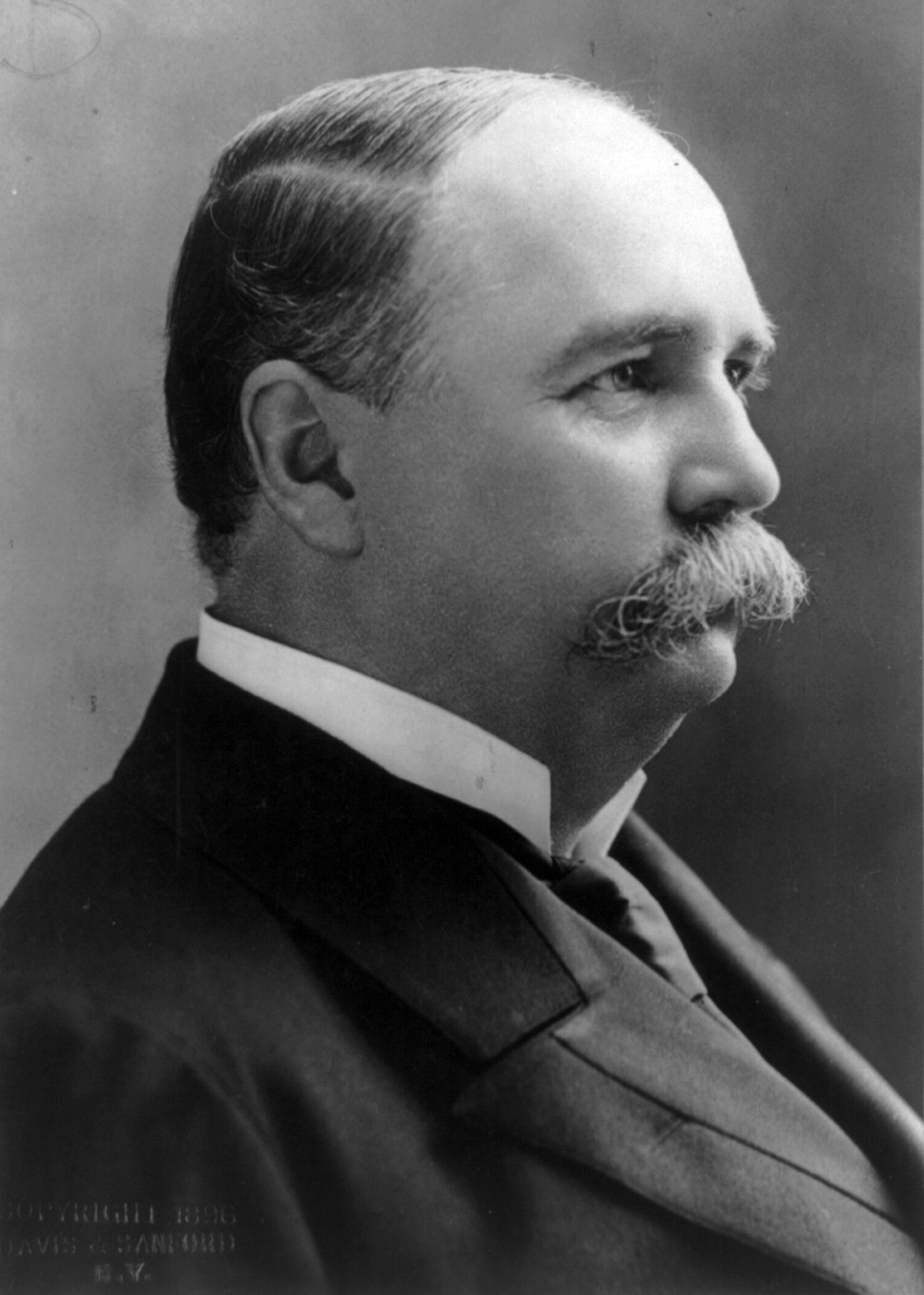
Vice President Hobart

Hobart was constant in his attendance at the Senate; one onlooker called him a "chronic audience". Vice President Hobart cast his tie-breaking vote only once, using it to defeat an amendment which would have promised self-government to the Philippines, one of the possessions which the United States had taken from Spain after the war. Hobart was instrumental in securing the ratification of the Treaty of Paris, which ended the war; according to McKinley biographer H. Wayne Morgan, Hobart was "almost the president's alter ego, [turning] every screw with his legendary politeness".

One post which Hobart refused to relinquish upon his inauguration was his position as one of three Joint Traffic Association (JTA) arbiters. The association was a group of railroads which sought to coordinate rates; if two railroads applied rates in different ways, the matter was settled by Hobart and two other arbiters. Hobart heard appeals while vice president. An October 1897 Supreme Court decision signaled that the JTA was likely to be found in violation of the Sherman Anti-Trust Act (it was, the following year) and Hobart resigned as arbiter in November 1897. Hobart was a major investor in the Ramapo Water Company; he had interests in many New York and New Jersey water utilities. In mid-1899, there was controversy over the so-called "Ramapo Scheme", whereby the Ramapo Water Company, which owned large tracts of land in the Catskill Mountains, would sell New York City $5 million in water per year for 40 years at high rates. The proposal was never agreed to, and a Republican-controlled investigating committee found no wrongdoing, but Hobart's role in the company was widely discussed in the press.

=== Illness and death ===
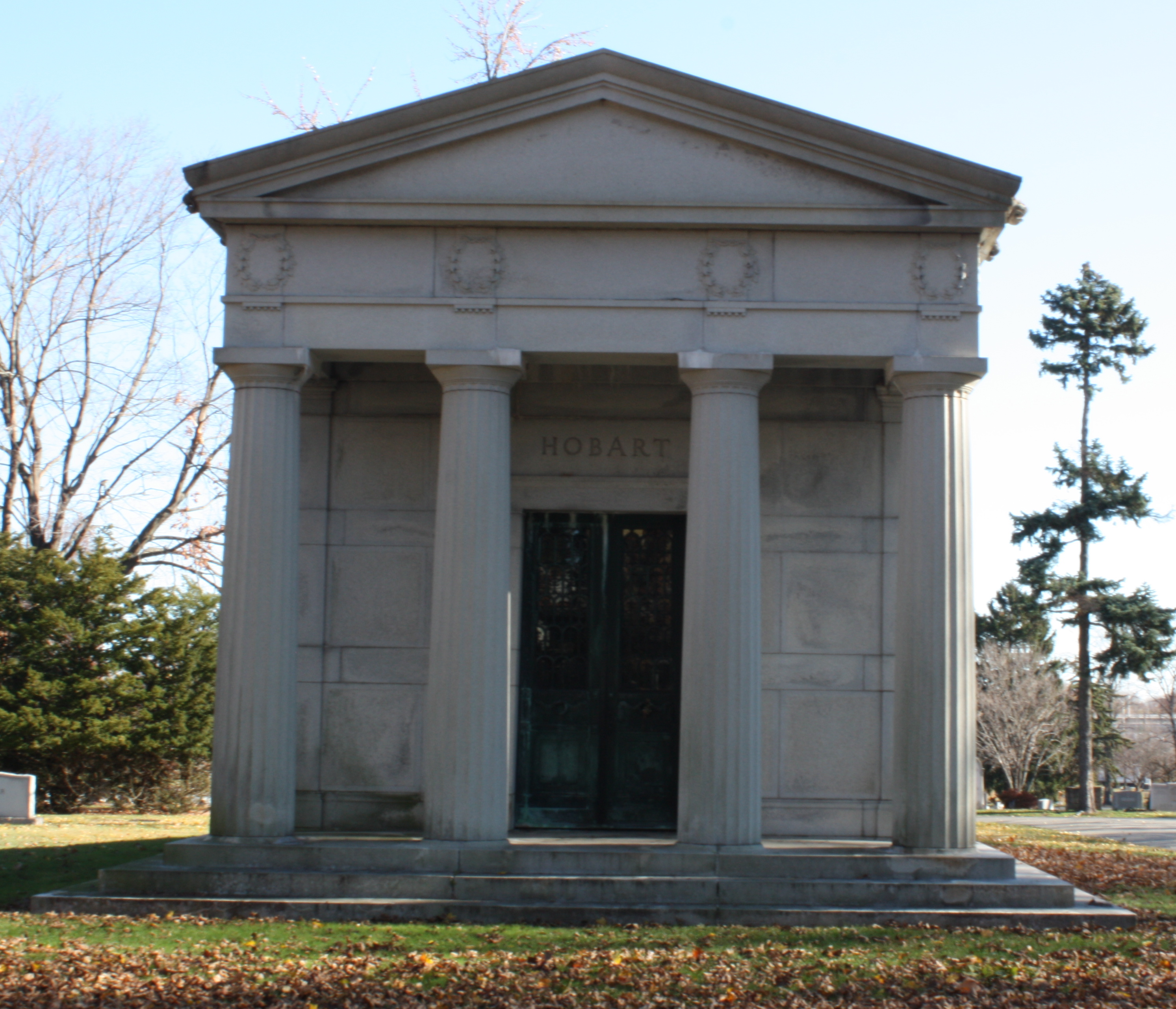
The mausoleum of Garret and Jennie Hobart at Cedar Lawn Cemetery in Paterson, New Jersey

By late 1898, Hobart was ill with a serious heart ailment, which he at first concealed from the public. He continued his responsibilities in the U.S. Senate, but nearly collapsed after delivering an address closing the session. He accompanied the president on a vacation trip to Hanna's winter home in Thomasville, Georgia, but quickly contracted the flu and returned to Washington, D.C.. By April 1899, Hobart's illness was well known, though Hanna assured media that Hobart would be on the ticket in the 1900 election, saying, "nothing but death or an earthquake can stop the re-nomination of Vice President Hobart".

Hobart rented a home in his birthplace of Long Branch, New Jersey, which was then an upscale Jersey Shore resort. Doctors prescribed complete rest, and the vice president amused himself by feeding two pet fish, a gold one named McKinley and a silver one named Bryan.

Despite his vice president's ill health, McKinley called upon him to break the news to Secretary of War Russell Alger that McKinley wanted him to resign; the secretary had previously ignored or misunderstood repeated hints from McKinley. According to McKinley biographer Margaret Leech, "the president did not show his usual hypersensitive regard for other people's feelings in handing over to a sick man a disagreeable task which it was his own duty to perform." Hobart invited Alger to Long Branch for the weekend, and broke the news, and Alger promptly submitted his resignation to McKinley.

Hobart's condition worsened in the days following Alger's visit, and he became bedridden. The Sun, a New York City-based newspaper at the time, attributed Alger's resignation to Hobart's "crystal insight" and "velvet tact". Following the description, Hobart wrote to McKinley, "My 'crystal insight' is still clear, but the nap is slightly worn off my velvet tact".

After a vacation with the McKinleys on Lake Champlain, Hobart returned to Paterson in September. On November 1, 1899, his family announced that Hobart would not return to public life. His condition deteriorated rapidly, and he died on November 21, 1899, at age 55. President McKinley told the family, "No one outside of this home feels this loss more deeply than I do."

Foster Voorhees, the New Jersey governor, ordered that state buildings be draped in mourning for 30 days, and that flags be flown at half staff until Hobart's funeral. Hobart's home, Carroll Hall, was opened to the public for four hours so that citizens might pass by his open casket; 12,000 people did so. Hobart was laid to rest at Cedar Lawn Cemetery in Paterson after a large public funeral, attended by President McKinley and many high government officials. Although the large government delegation precluded many local residents from attending the service, a crowd of 50,000 came to Paterson to honor Hobart.

The mausoleum over Hobart's grave was erected in 1901. His wife purchased eleven plots adjoining the family plot to accommodate the structure. The building has massive marble columns in the front with a heavy metal door; on the back above the sarcophagus is a stained glass window. There are two sarcophagi in the center of the building, for Garret Hobart and his wife. Around the tomb are niches for other members of the family. At the time of construction in 1901, the mausoleum cost about $80,000.

== Legacy ==
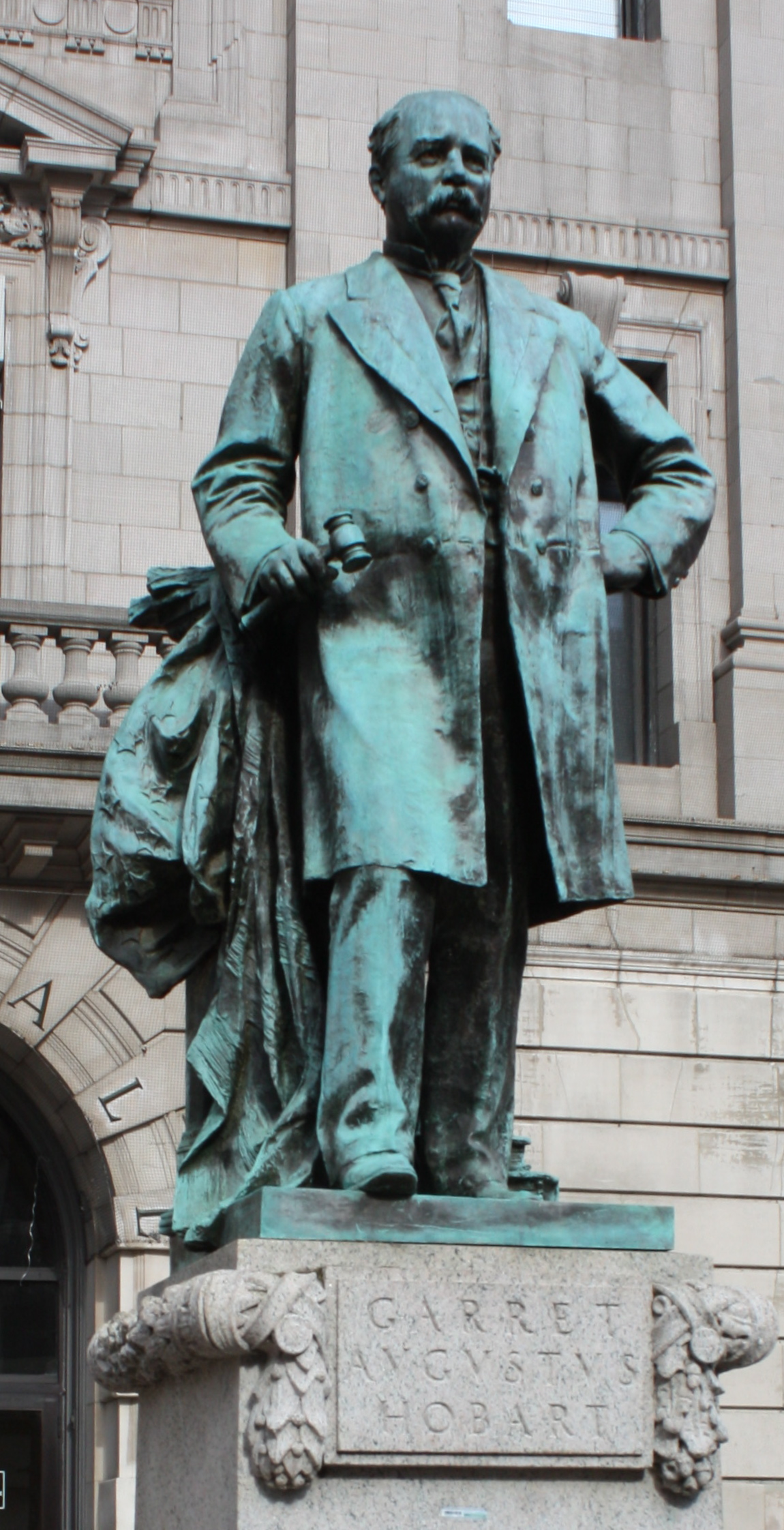
A statue of Hobart by Philip Martiny outside of City Hall in Paterson, New Jersey

Hobart significantly expanded the powers of the vice presidency, becoming a presidential advisor and taking a leadership role as president of the Senate. Between his advisory and leadership roles, he was perhaps the most influential vice president since Martin Van Buren. Although David Magie, writing in 1910, stated that Hobart's death "fixed his memory at the height of his fame", the former vice president today is little remembered. To date, the only in-depth biographies of Hobart are the one written in 1910 by Magie and a 1930 memoir written by Hobart's wife Jennie on the couple's life in Washington D.C. According to Hatfield, he is best known for his death, clearing the way for the ascent of New York Governor Theodore Roosevelt, who took Hobart's place on the Republican ticket in 1900 and succeeded as president after McKinley's assassination in 1901.

Connolly finds Hobart to be very much a man of his times:

The public increasingly identified Republicans with the union of big business, big money, and big government, a union that ignited a Progressive reaction after 1900. Vice President Garret A. Hobart directed that union as lawyer, business receiver and director, and New Jersey Republican. He represented everything Progressives hated: a railroad advocate when railroads became America's most mistrusted industry, a corporate attorney who facilitated the agglomeration of capital when the public revolted against monopolies and trusts, a financial operator who used his political insight to capture lucrative business opportunities, and a national leader who moved easily between the worlds of political pull and economic power. As much as Hanna or any Gilded Age business-politician, Hobart symbolized the era.

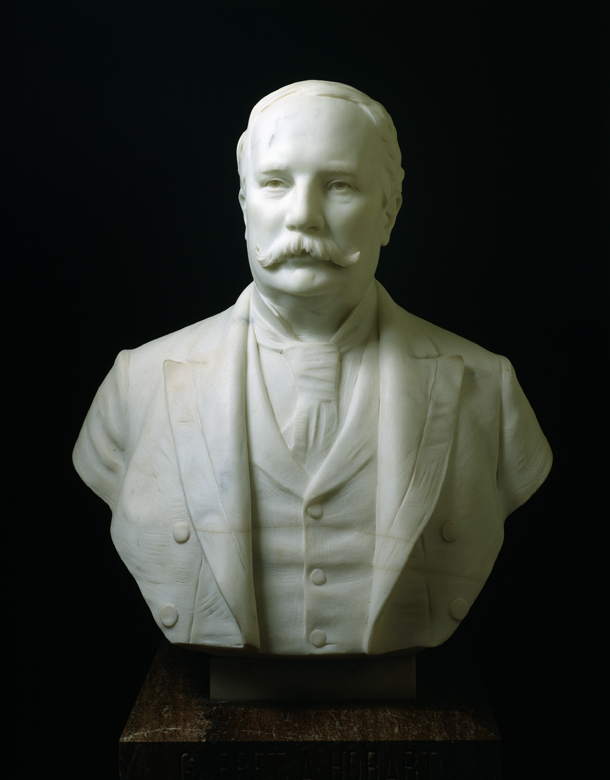
1901 bust of Hobart by Frank Elwell, part of the U.S. Senate Bust Collection

A century after Hobart's death, Gould wrote: "Despite the historical obscurity into which he has fallen, Hobart was a successful vice president who played a significant role in the McKinley administration." He was also praised by his successor, Roosevelt. The then-New York governor stated the day after Hobart's death:

What he did was done not by force of position, but by force of character, his rare tact, his extraordinary common sense, and the impression of sincerity he created upon every man with whom he was brought in contact.

A statue of Hobart, erected in 1903, stands outside Paterson's city hall. The communities of Hobart, Oklahoma, and Hobart, Washington, are named after the former vice president.

During his vice presidency, Hobart was asked to select a sculptor to create a marble bust of his likeness for the United States Senate Vice Presidential Bust Collection. However, he delayed the decision and died before he could select someone. Jennie Hobart later chose the prominent New Jersey sculptor Frank Edwin Elwell, and Elwell completed it in 1901. That same year, it was placed in the U.S. Capitol Building.

== Electoral history ==
Election	Political result	Candidate	Party	Votes	%	±%
New Jersey General Assembly – Passaic County, Third District – November 5, 1872.	Republican hold	Garret Hobart	Republican	1,787	65.03	
New Jersey General Assembly – Passaic County, Third District – November 5, 1872.	Republican hold	William Oakley	Democratic	961	34.97	
New Jersey General Assembly – Passaic County, Third District – November 4, 1873.	Republican hold	Garret Hobart*	Republican	1,490	59.29	
New Jersey General Assembly – Passaic County, Third District – November 4, 1873.	Republican hold	Gerrit Planten	Democratic	1,023	40.71	
New Jersey Senate – Passaic County – November 7, 1876	Republican gain from Democratic	Garret Hobart	Republican	5,912	54.16	
New Jersey Senate – Passaic County – November 7, 1876	Republican gain from Democratic	Charles Inglis	Democratic	5,022	45.84	
New Jersey Senate – Passaic County – November 4, 1879	Republican hold	Garret Hobart*	Republican	5,546	59.54	
New Jersey Senate – Passaic County – November 4, 1879	Republican hold	Garret A. Hopper	Democratic	3,647	39.15	
New Jersey Senate – Passaic County – November 4, 1879	Republican hold	John Warr	Greenback	122	1.31	
1883 United States Senate election in New Jersey – by the New Jersey Legislature in joint session – January 24, 1883; For the six-year term beginning March 4, 1883. McPherson was elected on the first ballot; 41 votes needed for election.	Democratic hold	John R. McPherson*	Democratic	43	53.09	
1883 United States Senate election in New Jersey – by the New Jersey Legislature in joint session – January 24, 1883; For the six-year term beginning March 4, 1883. McPherson was elected on the first ballot; 41 votes needed for election.	Democratic hold	Garret Hobart	Republican	36	44.44	
1883 United States Senate election in New Jersey – by the New Jersey Legislature in joint session – January 24, 1883; For the six-year term beginning March 4, 1883. McPherson was elected on the first ballot; 41 votes needed for election.	Democratic hold	George C. Ludlow	Democratic	2	2.47	
1896 United States presidential election – Electoral College balloting for vice president. – Popular vote November 3, 1896, in most states. The Democrats and People's Party (or Populists) both nominated William Jennings Bryan for president but the two parties chose different vice presidential candidates. Hobart's presidential running mate was William McKinley, who was also elected with 271 electoral votes. Candidates required 224 electoral votes for a majority. For the popular vote, see 1896 United States presidential election.	Republican gain from Democratic	Garret Hobart	Republican	271	60.63	
	Republican gain from Democratic	Arthur Sewall	Democratic	149	33.33	
	Republican gain from Democratic	Thomas E. Watson	Populist	27	6.04	

* Incumbent

Political offices
Preceded by Isaac L. Fisher	Speaker of the New Jersey General Assembly; 1874	Succeeded by George O. Vanderbilt
Preceded by William Sewell	President of the New Jersey Senate; 1881–1882	Succeeded by John J. Gardner
Preceded by Adlai Stevenson	Vice President of the United States; 1897–1899	Succeeded by Theodore Roosevelt
Party political offices
Preceded by James S. Clarkson	Vice Chair of the Republican National Committee; 1881–1896	Succeeded by Henry Clay Payne
Preceded by George M. Robeson	Chair of the New Jersey Republican Party; 1880–1891	Succeeded by John Kean
Preceded by Whitelaw Reid	Republican nominee for Vice President of the United States; 1896	Succeeded by Theodore Roosevelt
