= Charles V. Webb Jr. =

American lawyer (1910-2010)

Essex County Prosecutor
- In office November 13, 1952 – February 16, 1959

Personal details
- Born: Charles V. Webb Jr. April 17, 1910 East Orange, New Jersey, U.S.
- Died: May 15, 2010 (aged 100) East Orange, New Jersey, U.S.
- Party: Republican
- Spouse: Rosemary T. Wiesel Webb
- Occupation: Lawyer

Charles W. Webb Jr. (April 17, 1910 – May 15, 2010) was an American Republican Party politician from Essex County, New Jersey.

== Biography ==
Born in East Orange, New Jersey, Webb was a 1927 graduate of Orange High School and worked as a bookkeeper in the Newark law offices of George S. Hobart, a former Speaker of the New Jersey General Assembly. He filed a certificate of clerkship with the New Jersey Supreme Court and read law at Hobart and Minard (under the supervision of Hobart, a former Speaker of the New Jersey General Assembly) until passing the New Jersey bar exam in 1934 and a two-day written counselors exam in 1937.

Then a resident of Maplewood, New Jersey, Governor Alfred Driscoll appointed him to serve as Essex County Prosecutor. After his confirmation by the State Senate, he took office on November 13, 1952 and served until February 16, 1959.

Webb became a candidate for the New Jersey State Senate in 1959, seeking to challenge incumbent Donal C. Fox, a Democrat who was seeking re-election to a second term. Webb ran on the Essex Republican organization line with the backing of County Chairman William Yeomans, but faced a strong opponent in the GOP primary: former State Senator Alfred C. Clapp, who agreed to lead a slate of reform candidates opposed to Yeomans. Clapp defeated Webb by more than 20,000 votes, 31,551 (72%) to 12,177 (28%) and his "Clean Government" slate of 12 Assembly candidates all won the primary against the organization ticket. Webb's loss in the 1959 primary paved the way for former Congressman Robert W. Kean to oust Yeomans in a race for Essex County Republican Chairman one week later.

After losing the Senate race, Webb started a law firm, Webb, McDermott & McGee, which specialized in medical malpractice defense. He retired in 1975. He was married to Rosemary T. Wiesel from 1936 until her death in 1982. He died in 2010, less than a month after his 100th birthday.
