= Socrates Mountain =

Mountain in West Virginia, United States

Coordinates: 38°35′53″N 79°17′27″W

Socrates Mountain is a summit in Pendleton County, West Virginia, in the United States. With an elevation of 3,386 feet (1,032 m), Socrates Mountain is the 219th highest summit in the state of West Virginia.

The mountain was named for Socrates, the ancient Greek philosopher.
