= Socrates Tuttle =

Mayor of Paterson, New Jersey

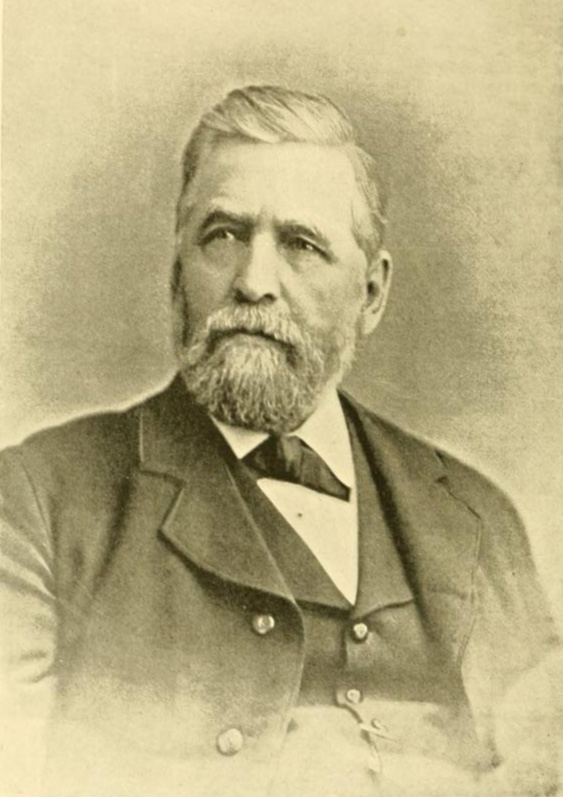

Mayor of Paterson, New Jersey
- In office 1871–1872
- Preceded by: John Ryle
- Succeeded by: Nathaniel Townsend

Personal details
- Born: November 19, 1819 Colebrook, New Hampshire, U.S.
- Died: February 12, 1885 (aged 65) Paterson, New Jersey, U.S.
- Party: Republican
- Spouse: Jane Winters
- Children: 2, including Jennie Tuttle Hobart
- Profession: politician

Socrates Tuttle (November 19, 1819 – February 12, 1885) was the Mayor of Paterson, New Jersey, from 1871 to 1872.

== Biography ==
He was born on November 19, 1819, in Colebrook, New Hampshire, to Horatio Tuttle and Betsey Thomas. He had two children, Hobart Tuttle and Jennie Tuttle Hobart. Jennie was the wife of Vice President of the United States Garret Hobart and therefore was Second Lady of the United States. He died of angina pectoris in 1885.
