= George S. Hobart =

American politician

George S. Hobart (October 24, 1875 – November 1, 1938) was an American Republican Party politician who served as Speaker of the New Jersey General Assembly. He was the nephew of Garret Hobart, the 24th Vice President of the United States under President William McKinley.

== Early life ==
Hobart was born in Brooklyn, New York, on October 24, 1875, the son of David Roswell Hobart and Ella Smock Hobart. He grew up on a farm in Marlboro Township, New Jersey, and graduated from Rutgers College in 1896. He graduated New York Law School in 1898. At the outbreak of the Spanish War in 1898, Hobart enlisted in the Third New Jersey Regiment, U.S. Volunteers, and was commissioned as a Major with the Seventh Army Corps under the command of Major General Fitzhugh Lee. He was a partner in the law firm of Collins & Corbin, with offices in Jersey City and Newark, New Jersey.

== Political career ==
He was elected to the New Jersey General Assembly in 1917, and elected again in 1920 and 1921. He was the Assembly Speaker in 1921. As an Assemblyman, Hobart was the sponsor of the New Jersey Prohibition Enforcement Act.

On September 23, 1930, New Jersey Attorney General William A. Stevens announced that he was appointing Hobart as the Deputy Attorney General and was installing him as the Acting Bergen County Prosecutor. Stevens's actions came after New Jersey Supreme Court Justice Charles W. Parker ordered the removal of Edward O. West as Prosecutor.

== Later life ==
Hobart founded the Newark Law firm of Hobart, Minard and Cooper. Among his proteges was Charles V. Webb Jr., who would become the Essex County Prosecutor. He died on November 1, 1938, at his home in Newark after a short illness.

Preceded by Isaac L. Fisher	Speaker of the New Jersey General Assembly; 1921– 1921	Succeeded by T. Harry Rowland
