= Socrates Tzartos =

Greek biologist and neuro-immunologist

- Σωκράτης Τζάρτος
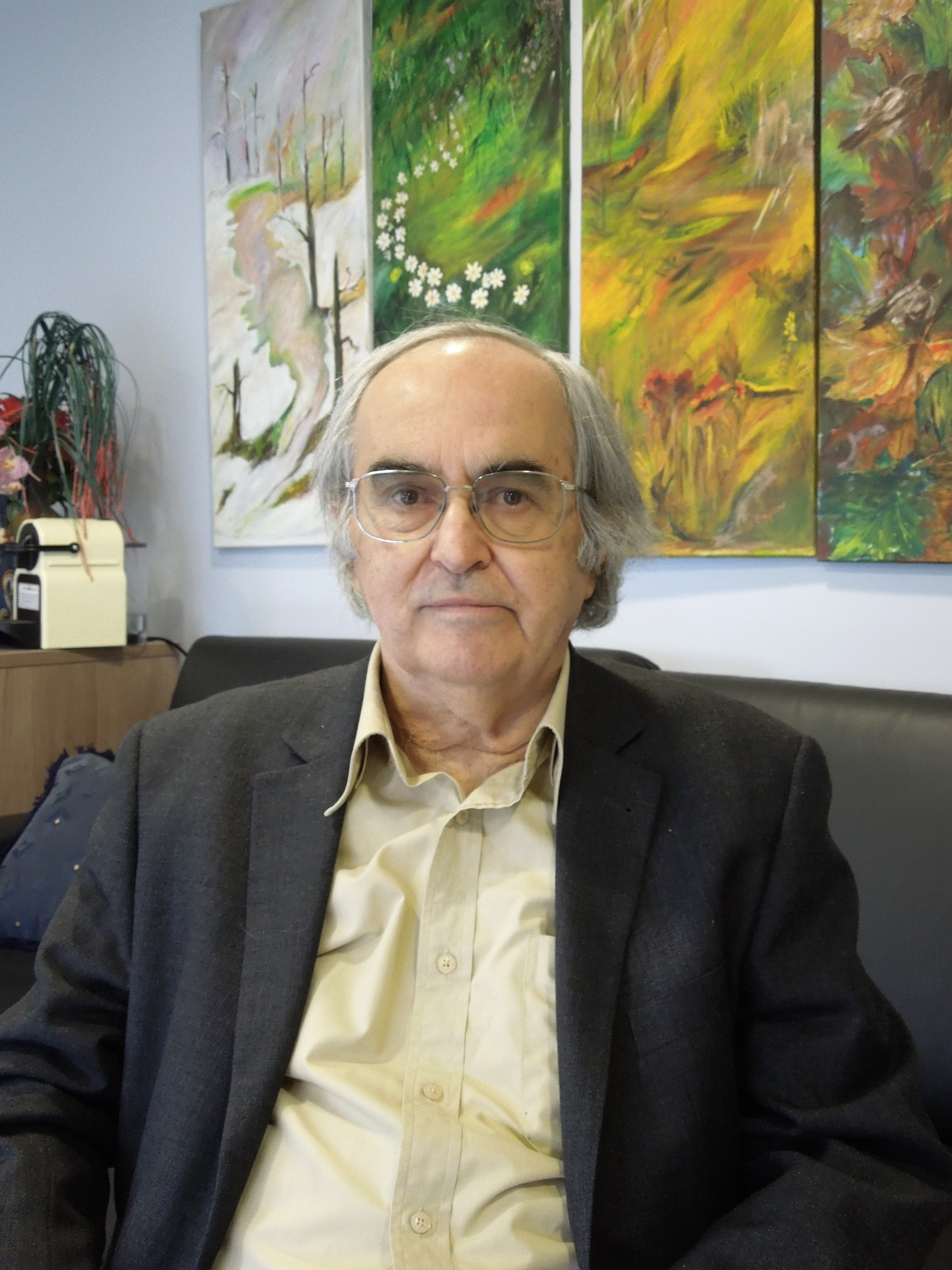
- Tzartos at his office at the Pasteur Hellenic Institute
- Education: University of Athens (MA, DPhil)
- Spouse: Elisabeth Perdiki (m. 1971)
- Children: 1
- Scientific career
- Institutions: Pasteur Hellenic Institute; University of Patras
- Thesis: (1976)

Socrates Tzartos (Greek: Σωκράτης Τζάρτος) is a Greek biologist and neuro-immunologist. He is professor emeritus of the Department of Pharmacy of the University of Patras, and a researcher emeritus of the Department of Neurobiology of the Hellenic Pasteur Institute in Athens.

== Career ==
Socrates Tzartos received his Ph.D. from the University of Athens in 1976. He has held numerous positions during his career. He started working as a post-doctoral researcher in 1976 at the Physiological laboratory of the University of Cambridge until 1978. After that he worked as a research associate at the Salk Institute for Biological Studies in San Diego until 1983 when he started working at the Institut Pasteur Paris. He worked at the Institute for 2 years after which he started working as the head of the Biochemistry Laboratory, later renamed: Laboratory of Molecular Neurobiology and Immunology, at the Hellenic Pasteur Institute in Athens. Socrates has held this position until 2016 but has also worked in 1996 and 1997 as the Interim Acting General Director of the Institute.

In addition to his work at the Pasteur Hellenic Institute he has also held other positions at different institutions. He has taught as a professor of immunobiology at the Department of Pharmacy at the University of Patras for more than 10 years. He was also the Deputy Chairman of the Department from 2003 to 2005. Currently he is a professor emeritus at the University of Patras and a researcher emeritus at the Hellenic Pasteur Institute.

=== Research ===
Socrates was awarded a total of 59 research grants. Out of them, 17 have been from the European Commission (6 as coordinator), 28 from other international sources (most from the muscular dystrophy organizations MDA and AFM) and 14 from Greek sources. Over the course of his career he has produced a total of 290 scientific papers (187 original papers in refereed international journals, 80 reviews and 23 papers in Greek journals).

=== Teaching ===
Socrates has been a mentor to 9 MSc students, 28 PhD students and more than 20 postdocs.

=== Memberships, awards and honors ===
He has been a member of several academic organizations both in Greece and abroad. He is a member of the Greek Society of Immunologists, Greek Society of Biochemistry and Molecular biology, Greek Society of Neurosciences, International Society of Neuroimmunology, Neuroscience Society of USA, British Biochemical Society, European Peptide Society, British Crystallographic Association, Clare Hall, Cambridge University.

He has also received several awards and honors:

- 1972-76: Four pre-doctoral fellowships from the Natl. Hellenic Research Foundation.
- 1976-78: Two long-term Post-doctoral EMBO fellowships.
- 1979-81: Two Post-doctoral fellowships from the Muscular Dystrophy Association of America.
- 1981-83: Two long-term Post-doctoral EMBO fellowships.
- 1988-1990, 1998, 2003: 4 awards of the 14th and 16th, 24th και 29th Panhellenic Medical Symposia.
- 1993: Short-term (3-month) EMBO fellowship.
- 1994: Full member of EMBO (European Molecular Biology Organization).
- 2012-2011: Program Director of Graduate Studies, Department of Pharmacy, University of Patras
- 2013 and 2015: Participated in two Awards of the American Academy of Neurology annual Conferences, USA.
