= Sokratis Kyrillidis =

Greek footballer

Personal information
- Date of birth: 15 June 1998 (age 28)
- Place of birth: Kozani, Greece
- Height: 1.73 m (5 ft 8 in)
- Position: Defensive midfielder

Team information
- Current team: Ialysos
- Number: 5

Youth career
- PAOK

Senior career*
Years	Team	Apps	(Gls)
2017–2018	PAOK	0	(0)
2017	→ Aiginiakos (loan)	5	(0)
2017–2018	→ Pierikos (loan)		
2018–2019	Paleochora		
2019–2020	Asteras Itea		
2020–	Ialysos	1	(0)
- * Club domestic league appearances and goals as of 12 January 2020

Sokratis Kyrillidis (Greek: Σωκράτης Κυριλλίδης; born 15 June 1998) is a Greek professional footballer who plays as a defensive midfielder for Football League club Ialysos.
