= Sokratis Kosmidis =

Greek lawyer and politician

Sokratis Kosmidis alternatively Socrates Kosmidis
- Σωκράτης Κοσμίδης
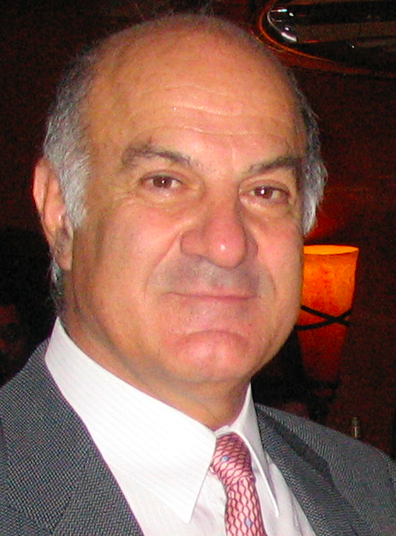

Member of Parliament
- In office 7 March 2004 - 18 August 2007

General Secretariat of the Cabinet
- In office 25 September 1996 - 20 February 2004
- Prime Minister: Costas Simitis

General Secretariat of the Ministry of Public Order
- In office 28 February 1996 - 24 September 1996
- Minister: Kostas Geitonas (28 February 1996 - August 30, 1996); Konstantinos Beis (August 30, 1996 - September 1996)

General Secretariat of the Ministry of Trade
- In office 1 November 1993 - 3 October 1995
- Minister: Costas Simitis (1 November 1993 - 15 September 1995); Nikolaos Akritidis (15 September 1995 - 3 October 1995)

Personal details
- Born: 30 November 1943 (age 82) Piraeus, Greece
- Party: Panhellenic Socialist Movement (PASOK)
- Spouse: Domniki Mitilineou
- Children: Ioanna; Nikolaos
- Education: National and Kapodistrian University of Athens

Sokratis Kosmidis (Greek: Σωκράτης Κοσμίδης; born 30 November 1943) is a Greek lawyer and public servant who served as General Secretariat of the Cabinet as well as a Member of the Hellenic Parliament.

== Biography ==
Sokratis Kosmidis was born in Piraeus, the youngest of three children born to Ioannis Kosmidis, a shoemaker, and to his wife, Eleni (née Lolosidou). He studied Law at the National and Kapodistrian University of Athens. He is married to Domniki Kosmidou, and has two children, Ioanna and Nikolaos. He currently resides in Voula.

== Legal career ==
Sokratis Kosmidis worked as a lawyer for 25 years, between 1968 and 1993. During this time, Kosmidis served the following positions in his home city of Piraeus: From 1975 to 1978, he was director and columnist of the newspaper 'Piraeus Echoes' (Greek: Πειραϊκοί Αντίλαλοι); Between 1984 and 1987, he sat on the board of directors of the Piraeus Lawyer Association; From 1982 to 1989, he was chairman of the maritime agent and employee’s insurance fund.

Following his two-year period as General Secretariat of the Ministry of Trade, from 1993-1995, Kosmidis returned to practice law for a few months, before retiring from law altogether.

== Government career ==
Following the elections of 1993, Kosmidis was appointed by Minister of Trade Costas Simitis as General Secretariat of the Ministry of Trade. He held this post for two years, before returning to practice law. After working as a lawyer for a few more months, he was recruited yet again, this time to become General Secretariat of the Ministry of Public Order. After seven months, however, he was appointed General Secretariat of the Government by new Prime Minister Costas Simitis, a position which he held for eight years.

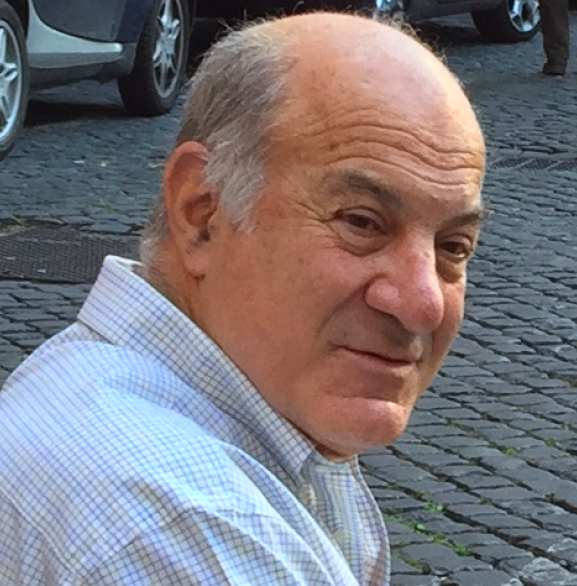
Sokratis Kosmidis in 2016

Following the elections of 2004, Kosmidis, now a prominent member of the PASOK party, became a Member of the Hellenic Parliament. He retired in 2007.

== Books ==
- Απάνθισμα άρθρων και σχολίων (1981) (Collection of Articles and Comments)
- Αυτό το κράτος μπορεί να διοικηθή; (1996) (Can this state manage?)
- Πολιτική για το φάρμακο (2002) (Drug Policy)
- Μια «αχρείαστη» Συνταγματική Αναθεώρηση (2007) (An unnecessary Constitutional Revision)
- Εκσυγχρονισμός και μεταρρυθμίσεις (2010) (Modernization and Reforms)
